= San Juan, Puerto Rico =

Capital and largest city of Puerto Rico

San Juan San Juan Bautista de Puerto Rico
- Capital city and municipality
- Municipio Autónomo de San Juan; Autonomous Municipality of San Juan
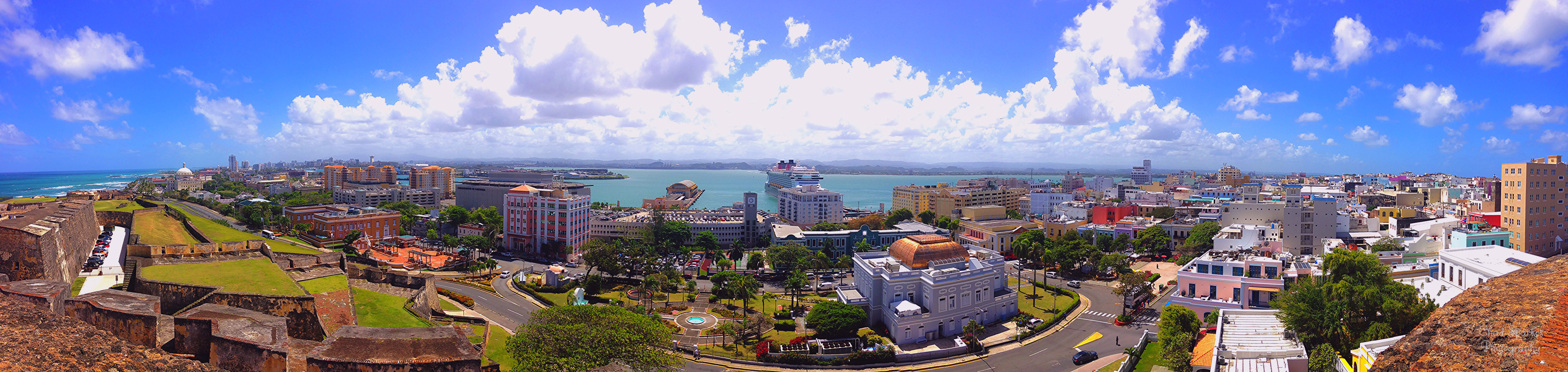
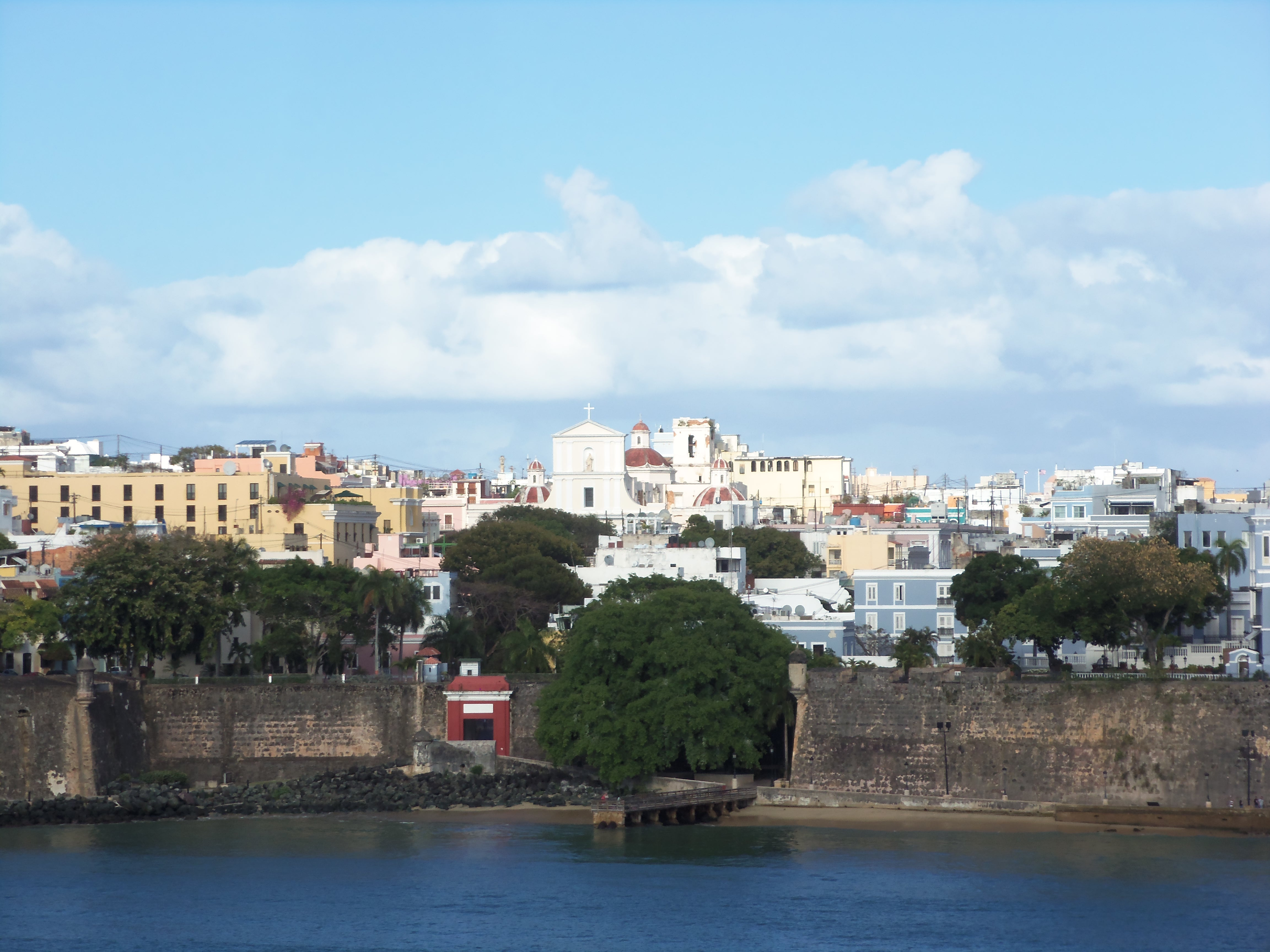
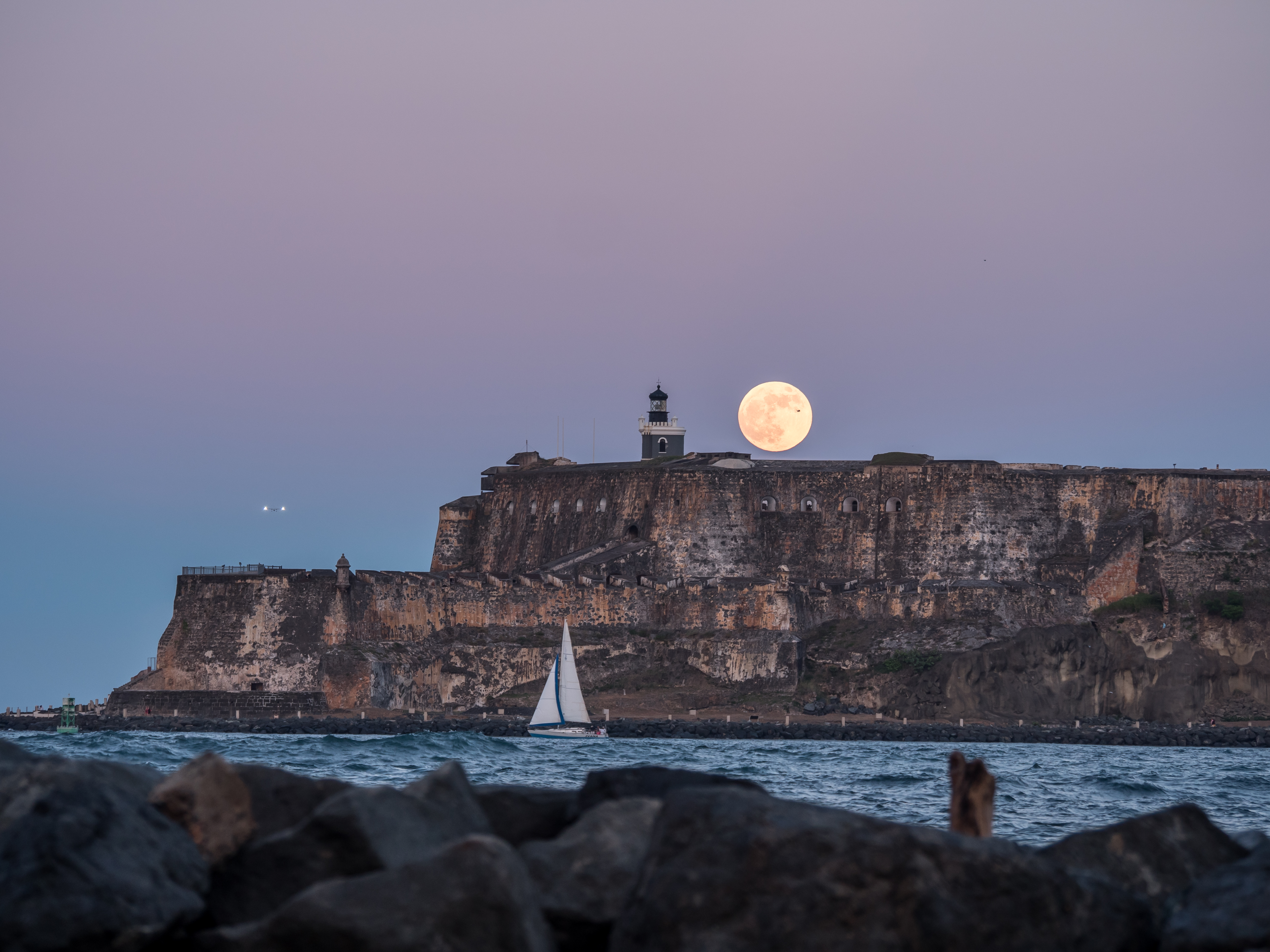
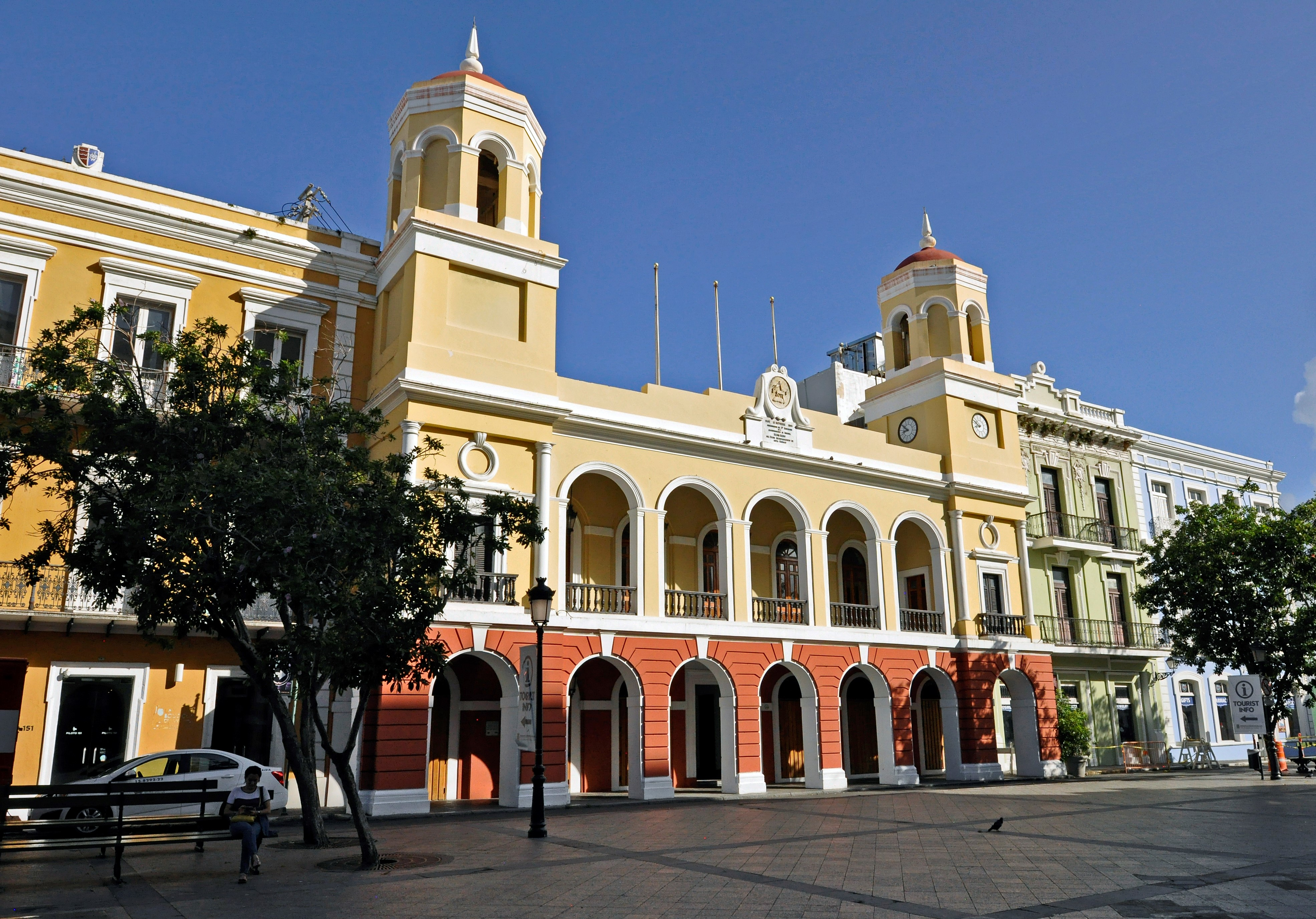
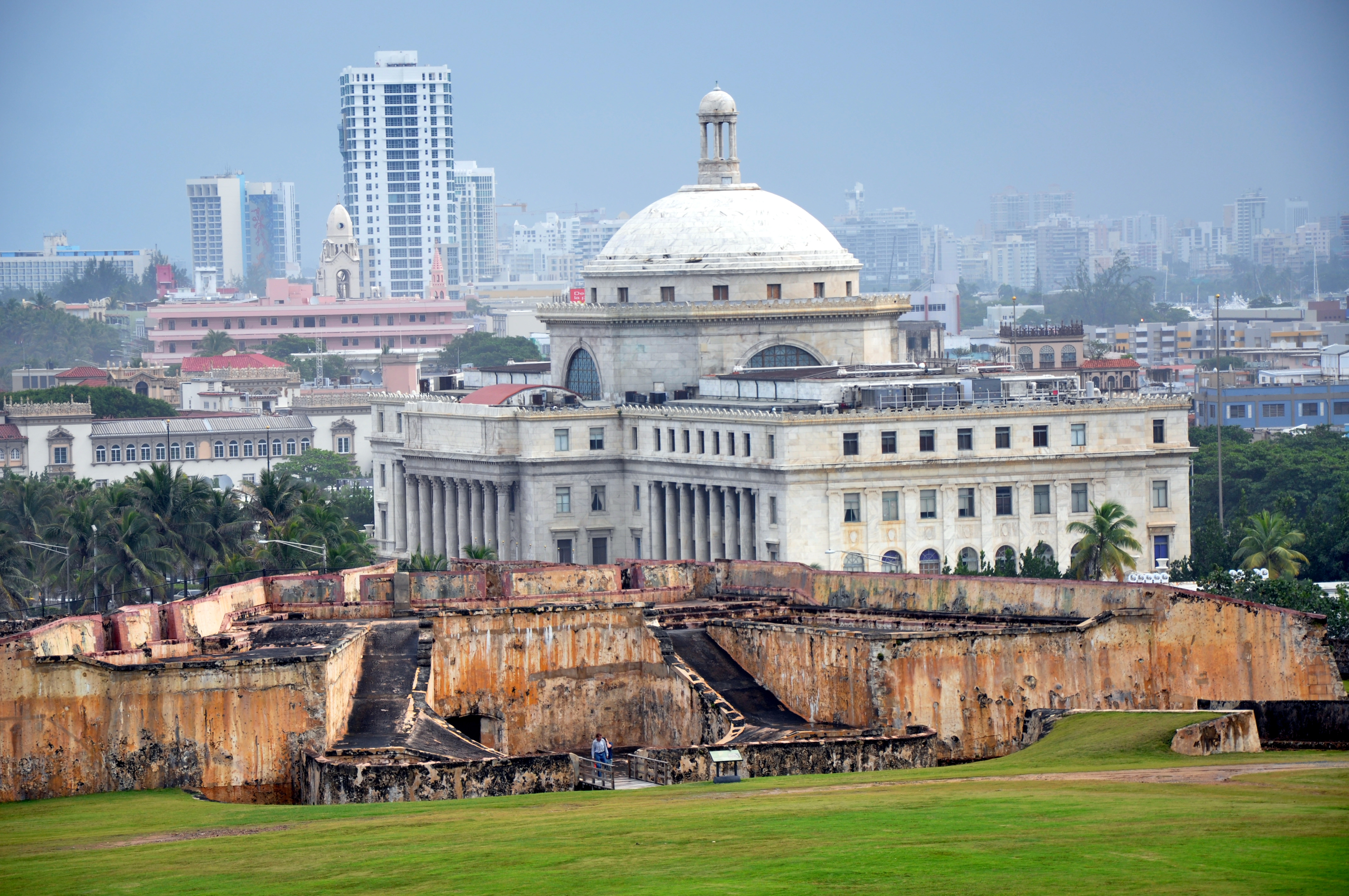
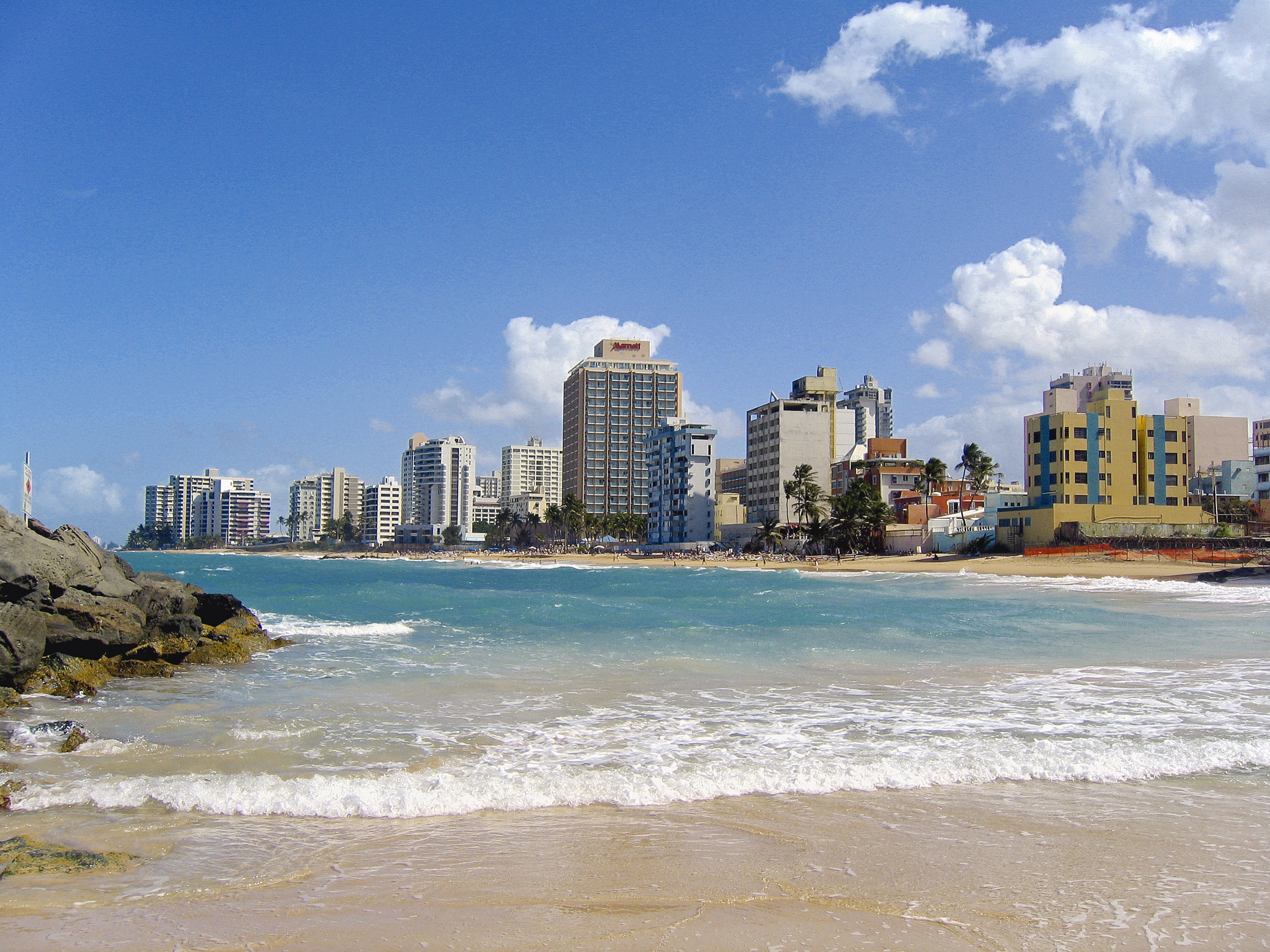
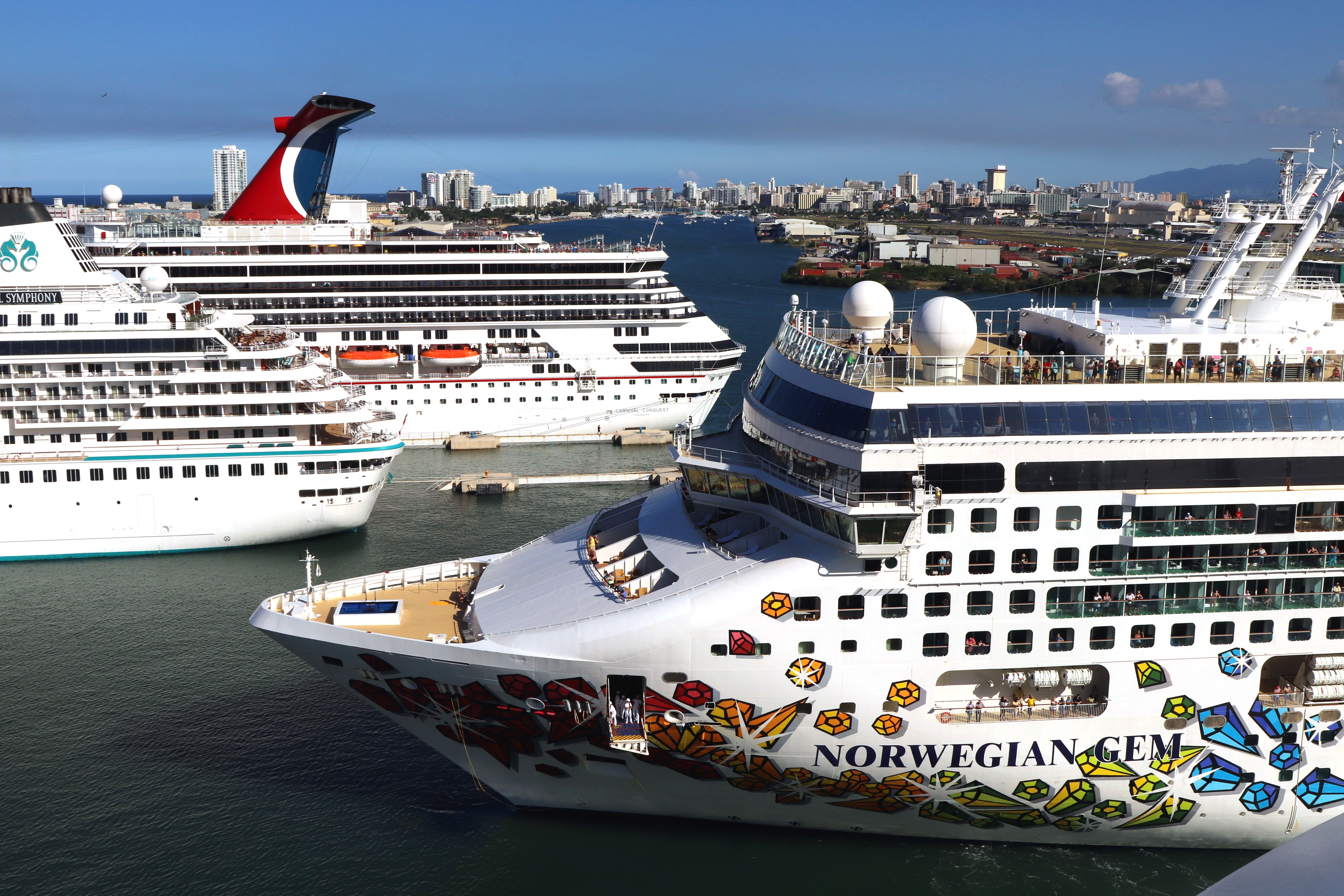
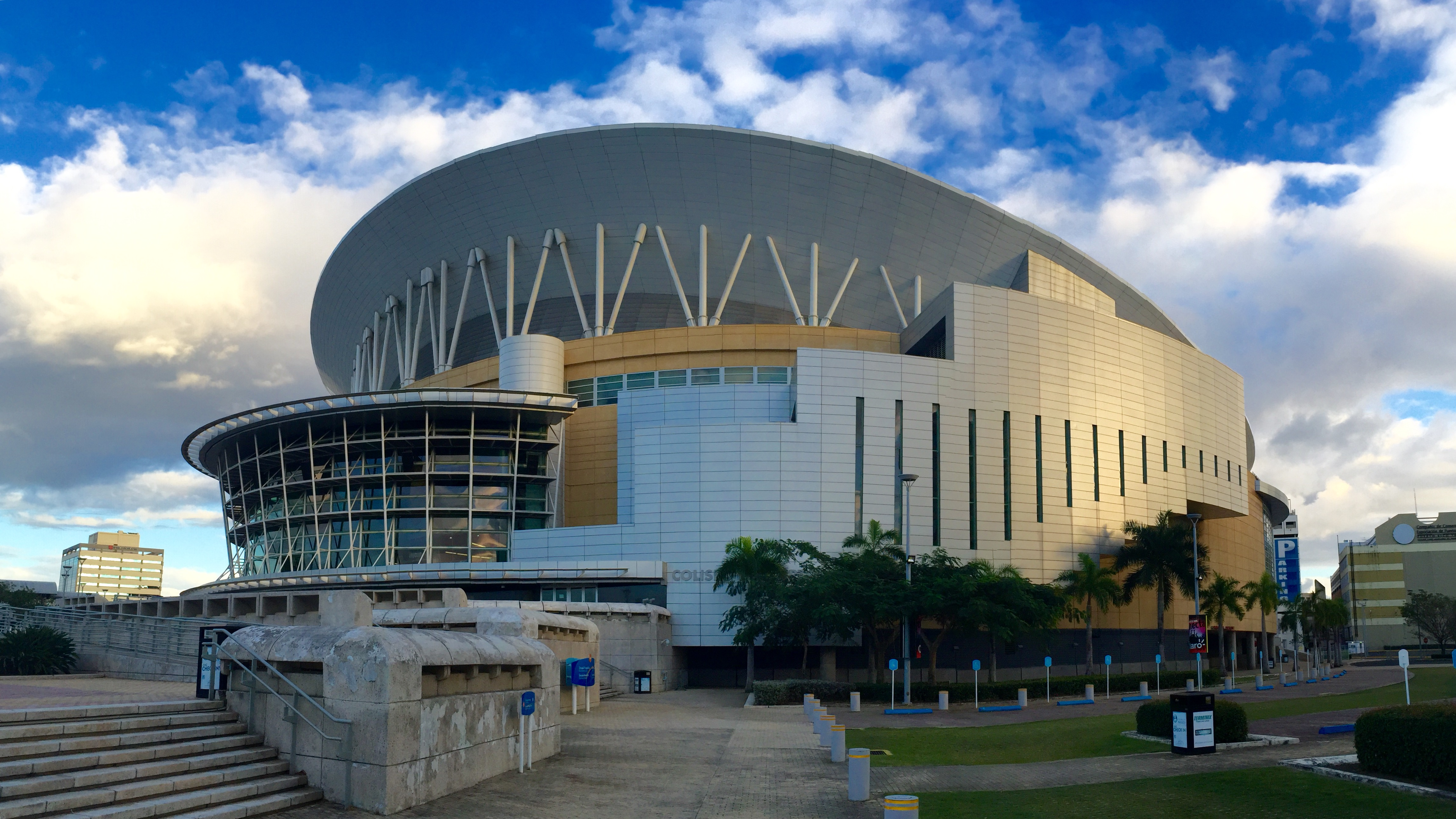
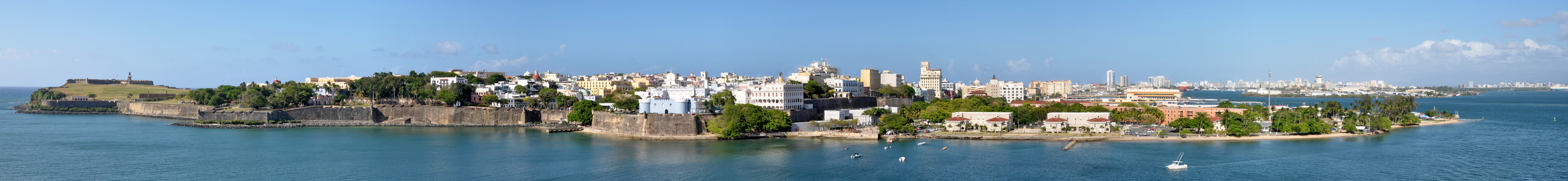
- Santurce barrio (far left), San Juan Bay (center), and Old San Juan quarter (right) from San Cristóbal fortress in San Juan Islet Old San Juan quarter El Morro fortress San Juan City Hall Puerto Rico Capitol Condado district San Juan Cruise Port Hato Rey district Choliseo arena Old San Juan quarter (foreground), Santurce barrio (background), and Hato Rey district (far background) from San Juan Bay

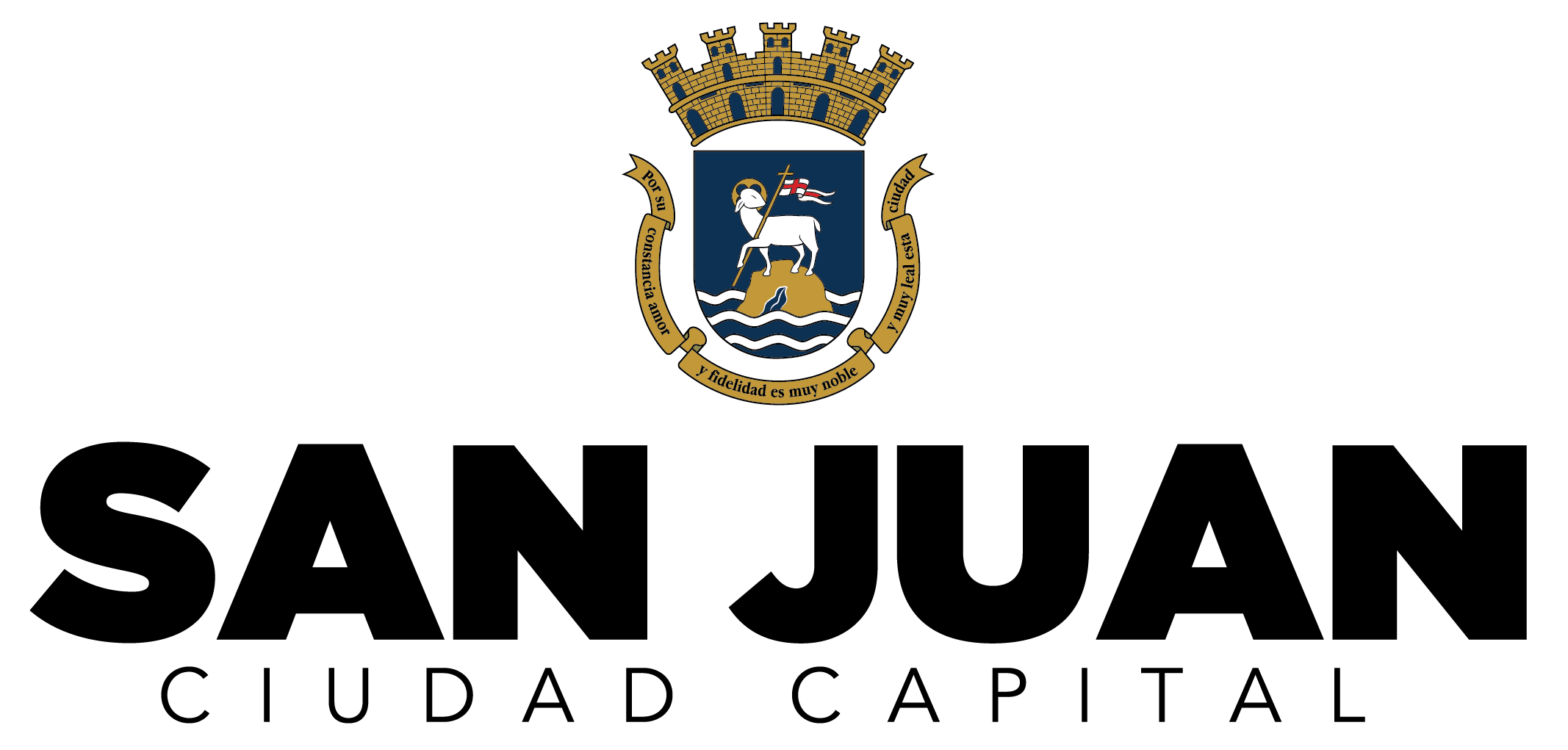
- Flag Coat of arms Logo
- Nicknames: La Llave de las Indias (The key to the Indies); La Ciudad Amurallada (The Walled City); Ciudad Capital (Capital City)
- Interactive map of San Juan
- Location within Puerto Rico San Juan (the Caribbean) San Juan (North America)
- Coordinates: 18°24′23″N 66°3′50″W
- Country: United States
- Commonwealth: Puerto Rico
- Precursor: Late 1508
- Diocese: August 8, 1511
- Founded: July 20, 1521
- Founder: Juan Ponce de León
- Named for: John the Baptist
- Seat: San Juan City Hall
- Subdivisions: 18 barrios: Caimito; Cupey; El Cinco; Gobernador Piñero; Hato Rey Central; Hato Rey Norte; Hato Rey Sur; Monacillo; Monacillo Urbano; Oriente; Pueblo; Quebrada Arenas; Sabana Llana Norte; Sabana Llana Sur; San Juan Antiguo; Santurce; Tortugo; Universidad

Government
  - Type: Mayor–council government
  - Body: Municipal Legislature
  - Mayor: Miguel Romero Lugo (PNP)

Area
  - Census (2020): 77.0 sq mi (199 km^{2})
  - Land: 47.9 sq mi (124 km^{2})
  - Water: 29.1 sq mi (75 km^{2}) 37.8%
- Elevation: 26 ft (8 m)

Population
  - Census (2020): ▼342,259
  - Estimate (2025): ▼329,737
  - Rank: 1st in Puerto Rico; 57th in the United States
  - Density: 7,147.1/sq mi (2,759.5/km^{2})
  - Metro: 842,535
- Demonym: Sanjuanero (male) Sanjuanera (female)
- Time zone: UTC−4 (AST)
- ZIP Codes: 00901, 00907, 00909, 00911-00913, 00915, 00917, 00918, 00920, 00921, 00923-00927
- Area codes: 787 and 939
- Website: sanjuan.pr

San Juan (/ˌsæn ˈhwɑːn/ san WHAHN, Spanish: [saŋ ˈxwan]; Spanish for "Saint John") is the capital city and most populous municipality in Puerto Rico, an unincorporated territory and insular area of the United States. San Juan was founded by Spanish imperialists in 1521, who called it Ciudad de Puerto Rico (Spanish for "Rich Port City").

Puerto Rico's capital is the second oldest European-established capital city in the Americas, after Santo Domingo, in the Dominican Republic, founded in 1496, and is the oldest European-established city under United States sovereignty. Several historical buildings are located in the historic district of Old San Juan; among the most notable are the city's former defensive walls, Fort San Felipe del Morro and Fort San Cristóbal, and La Fortaleza, the oldest executive mansion in continuous use in the Americas. These historic sites were declared a UNESCO World Heritage Site in 1983.

Today, San Juan is Puerto Rico's most important seaport and is one of the island's most notable financial, cultural, and tourism centers. The population of the metropolitan statistical area, including San Juan and the municipalities of Bayamón, Guaynabo, Cataño, Canóvanas, Caguas, Toa Alta, Toa Baja, Carolina and Trujillo Alto, is about 2.443 million inhabitants; thus, about 76% of the population of Puerto Rico now lives and works in this area. San Juan is also a principal city of the San Juan-Caguas-Fajardo Combined Statistical Area. The city has been the host of events within the sports community, including the 1979 Pan American Games; 1966 Central American and Caribbean Games; events of the 2006, 2009, 2013 and 2026 World Baseball Classics; and the Caribbean Series, the Special Olympics and MLB San Juan Series in 2010.

== History ==
=== Pre-Columbian era ===
The Taíno people were the original inhabitants of the area before the arrival of the Europeans to the island of Puerto Rico in 1493. Remains of a small indigenous fishing village have been found in Puerta de Tierra where the Puerto Rico National Guard Museum stands today, however most archaeological sites in the region have been destroyed and lost throughout the colonial history. The area of San Juan used to be the boundary between the tribal regions (yucayeques) of Guaynabo and Haimanio, led by the chiefs (caciques) Mabo and Yuisa (also known as Loaíza), respectively, at the time of the arrival of the Spanish conquistadors.

=== Founding ===
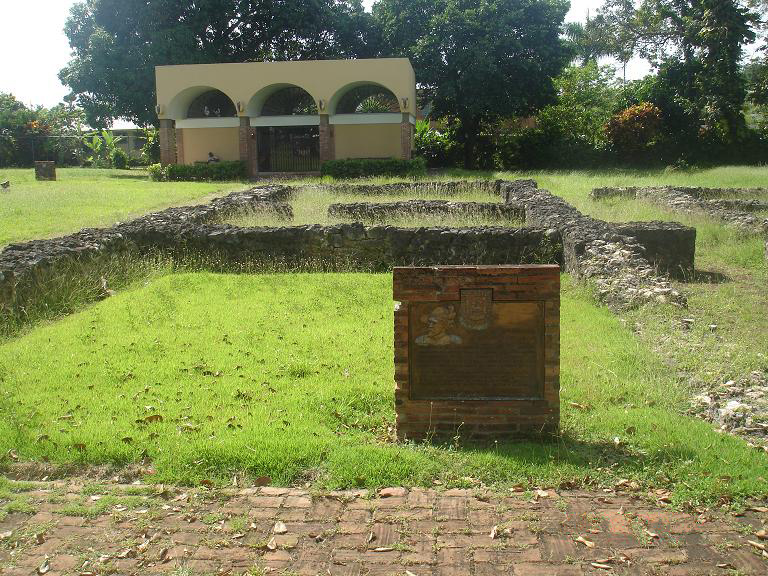
The ruins of Juan Ponce de León's residence at Caparra

In 1508, Juan Ponce de León founded the original settlement which he called Caparra. It was named after a former Roman city in the province of Cáceres in Spain, the birthplace of Nicolás de Ovando, then the Governor of Spain's Caribbean territories. Today, it is part of the Pueblo Viejo district of Guaynabo, directly to the west of the modern municipality of San Juan. A year later, the settlement was moved to a site then called Puerto Rico, Spanish for "rich port" or "good port".

The local Catholic diocese, the second oldest in the Americas and the oldest in the United States, was founded in the newly built settlement on August 8 of 1511. In 1521, the newer settlement was given its formal name: Ciudad de Puerto Rico de San Juan Bautista. Many of the oldest European-founded institutions in the Western Hemisphere, such as the Santo Tomás de Aquino Convent and the Nuestra Señora de la Concepción Hospital, were established during this time in San Juan.

The ambiguous use of San Juan Bautista and Puerto Rico for both the city and the island in time led to a reversal in practical use by most inhabitants: by 1746 the name for the city (Puerto Rico) had become that of the entire island, leading to the city being identified as Puerto Rico de Puerto Rico on maps of the era.

=== Spanish Colonial era ===
San Juan, as a settlement of the Spanish Empire, was used by merchant and military ships traveling from Spain as the first stopover in the Americas. Because of its prominence in the Caribbean, a network of fortifications was built to protect the transports of gold and silver from the New World to Europe. Because of the rich cargoes, San Juan became a target of the foreign powers of the time.

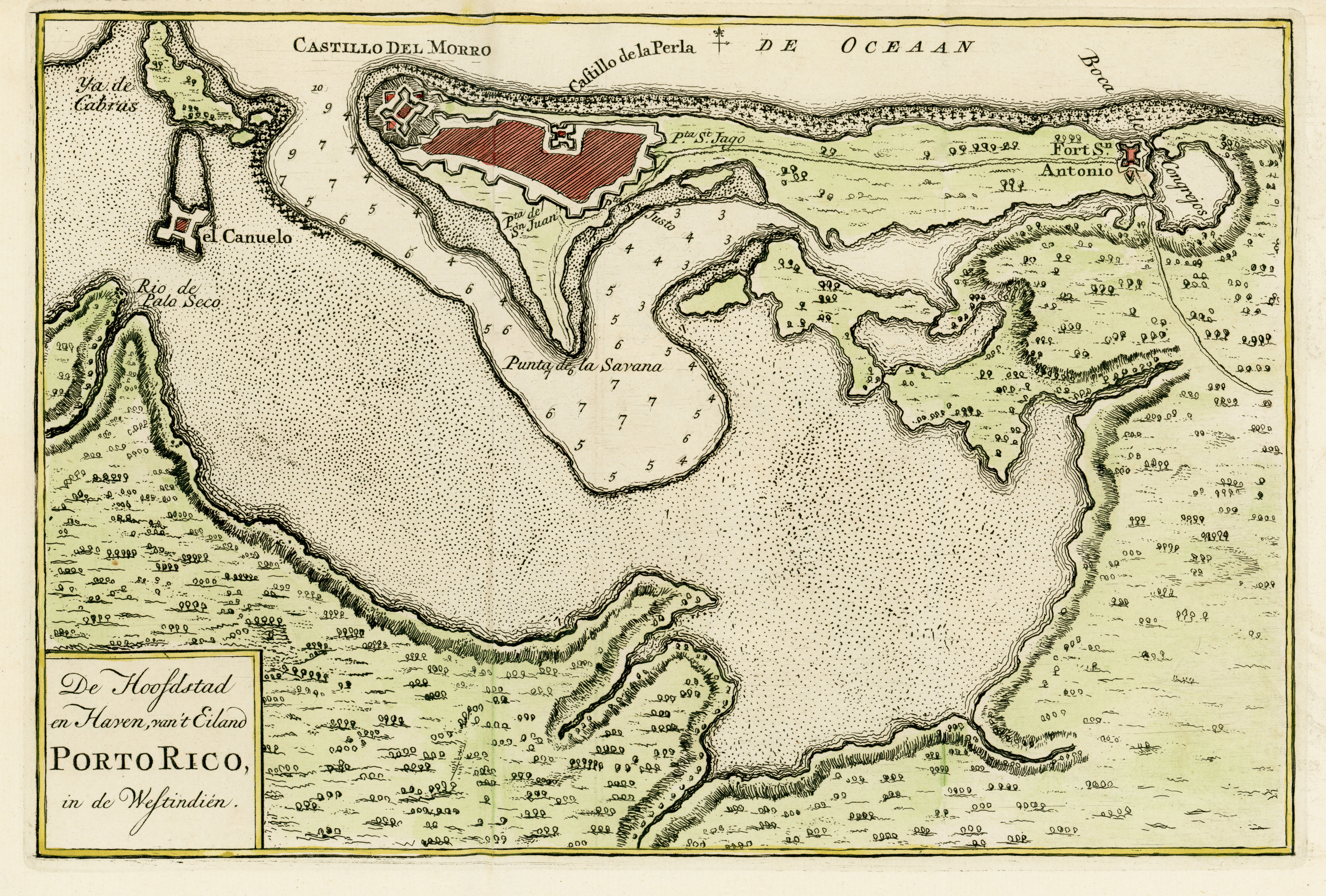
San Juan and bay, Puerto Rico, 1766

San Juan underwent attacks from the English led by Sir Francis Drake in 1595 (in what is known as the Battle of San Juan) and by George Clifford, Earl of Cumberland, in 1598. Artillery from San Juan's fort, El Morro, repelled Drake; however, Clifford managed to land troops and lay siege to the city. After a few months of English occupation, Clifford was forced to abandon the siege when his troops began to suffer from exhaustion and sickness. In 1625 the city was sacked by Dutch forces led by Captain Balduino Enrico (also known as Boudewijn Hendricksz/Bowdoin Henrick), but El Morro withstood the assault and was not taken. The Dutch were counterattacked by Captain Juan de Amézqueta and 50 members of the civilian militia on land and by the cannons of the Spanish troops in El Morro castle. The land battle left 60 Dutch soldiers dead and Enrico with a sword wound to his neck which he received from the hands of Amézqueta.

The Dutch ships at sea were boarded by Puerto Ricans who defeated those aboard. After a long battle, the Spanish soldiers and volunteers of the city's militia were able to defend the city from the attack and save the island from an invasion. On October 21, Enrico set La Fortaleza and the city ablaze. Captains Amézqueta and Andrés Botello decided to put a stop to the destruction and led 200 men in an attack against the enemy's front and rear guard. They drove Enrico and his men from their trenches and into the ocean in their haste to reach their ships.

The British attack in 1797, during the French Revolutionary Wars, led by Sir Ralph Abercromby (who had just conquered Trinidad). His army laid siege to the city but was forced to withdraw in defeat as the Puerto Rican defenses proved more resilient than those of Trinidad. Various events and circumstances, including liberalized commerce with Spain, the opening of the island to immigrants as a direct result of the Royal Decree of Graces of 1815, and the colonial revolutions, led to an expansion of San Juan and other Puerto Rican settlements in the late 18th and early 19th century.

=== Spanish-American War ===
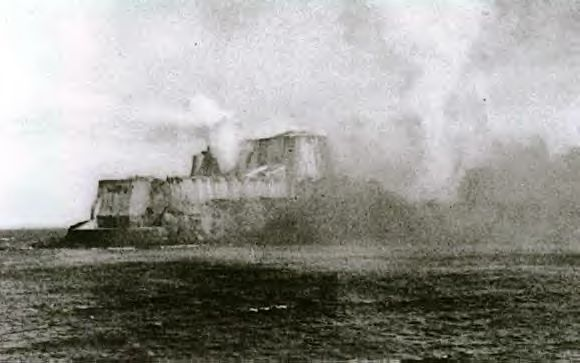
Bombardment of El Morro in 1898

On May 8, 1898, United States Navy ships, among them USS Detroit, USS Indiana, USS New York, USS Amphitrite, USS Terror and USS Montgomery, commanded by Rear Admiral William T. Sampson arrived at San Juan Bay. USS Yale captured the Spanish freighter Rita in San Juan Bay, thus being the first hostile encounter between the warring sides in Puerto Rico. On May 9, Yale fought a brief battle with an auxiliary cruiser of Spain, name unknown, resulting in a Spanish victory. Around this time, Captain Ángel Rivero Méndez was assigned the command of the Spanish forces in the fortress of San Cristóbal in San Juan. On May 10, Yale returned to San Juan Bay, Rivero-Méndez ordered his men to open fire upon Yale using an Ordoñez 15-centimeter cannon, thus becoming the first attack against the Americans in Puerto Rico during the Spanish–American War.

For his actions, Captain Rivero-Méndez was awarded the "Cruz de la Orden de Mérito Militar" (The Cross of the Order of the Military Merit) first class. The residents of San Juan were furious with Rivero and blamed him for the destruction caused to their city by the American bombardments. Nothing came of those accusations and Capt. Rivero-Méndez was ordered to turn over the keys of all the military installations in San Juan to Captain Henry A. Reed of the U.S. Army after the Treaty of Paris of 1898 was signed.

On July 25, General Nelson A. Miles landed at Guánica (in southwestern Puerto Rico) with 3,300 soldiers in what was known as the Puerto Rican Campaign. The American troops found some resistance and engaged the Spanish and Puerto Rican troops in battle, the most notable of these the battles of Yauco and Asomante. All military actions in Puerto Rico were suspended August 13, 1898, after President William McKinley and French Ambassador Jules Cambon, acting on behalf of the Spanish government, signed an armistice. Spain ceded the island to the United States later the same year by signing the Treaty of Paris.

=== 20th century ===
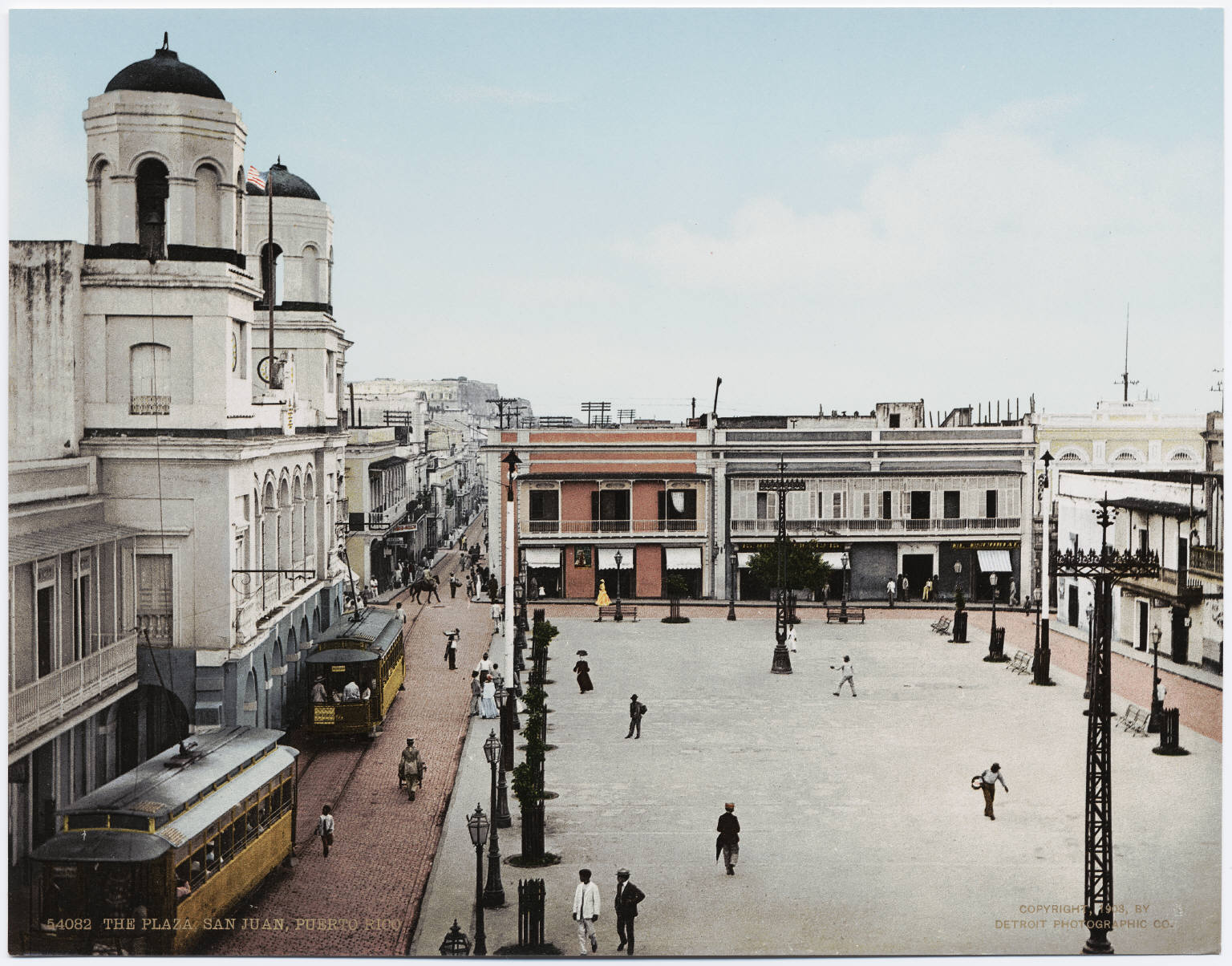
Plaza de Armas, San Juan, ca. 1900

Camp Las Casas, located in the district of Santurce, served as the main training camp for the Puerto Rican soldiers prior to World War I and World War II; the majority of the men trained in this facility were assigned to the "Porto Rico Regiment of Infantry" which was renamed the 65th Infantry Regiment of the United States Army by the Reorganization Act of June 4, 1920. The 65th Infantry was deactivated in 1956 and became the only unit ever to be transferred from an active Army component to the Puerto Rico National Guard.

Lieutenant Teófilo Marxuach (retired as a Lieutenant Colonel), a native of Arroyo, Puerto Rico, fired what is considered to be the first shot of World War I fired by the regular armed forces of the United States against any ship flying the colors of the Central Powers. Marxuach, who was a member of the "Porto Rico Regiment of Infantry" and Officer of the Day, on March 25, 1915, opened fire on the Odenwald, an armed German supply vessel, when it was trying to force its way out of San Juan's bay. The shots ordered by Lt. Marxuach were the first fired by the United States in World War I.

In 1919, Félix Rigau Carrera, "El Aguila de Sabana Grande" (The Eagle from Sabana Grande), the first Puerto Rican pilot, became the first native Puerto Rican to fly an aircraft in the island when he flew his Curtiss JN-4 from Las Casas. At the time, the area was used by the military as an air base and it was also Puerto Rico's first commercial airport, and Rigau Carrera was allowed to perform his historic flight from the airfield. Camp Las Casas was eventually closed down, and in 1950 a public housing project by the name of Residencial Fray Bartolome de Las Casas was constructed on its former location.

On January 2, 1947, the people of San Juan elected Felisa Rincón de Gautier (also known as Doña Fela) (1897–1994) as their mayor. Thus, she became the first woman to be elected as the mayor of a capital city in any of the Americas. During the Cold War era, she ordered the establishment of the island's first Civil Defense system under the directorship of Colonel Gilberto José Marxuach (Teófilo's son). Rincón de Gautier served as mayor until January 2, 1969. On October 30, 1950, San Juan was the scene of the San Juan Uprising, one of many uprisings which occurred in various towns and cities in Puerto Rico, by the Puerto Rican Nationalist Party against the governments of Puerto Rico and the United States. Among the uprising's main objective was to attack La Fortaleza and the United States Federal Court House Building in Old San Juan. The "La Fortaleza battle", which ensued between the nationalists and the police lasted 15 minutes and ended when four of the five attackers were killed.

=== 21st century ===
San Juan has experienced periods of both stagnation and development in the recent years. Gentrification has been noticeable in areas of the city such as Loíza Street in Santurce and Santa Rita in Río Piedras. In recent years the city has been the location of multiple strikes and protests, such as the 2001 protests against the United States Navy in the island municipality of Vieques, the 2010 and 2011 University of Puerto Rico strikes, and the 2019 protests against Governor Ricardo Rosselló which resulted in his resignation.

On September 20, 2017, Hurricane Maria made a direct impact in Puerto Rico, causing widespread damage and a collapse of the infrastructure in San Juan and the rest of Puerto Rico. The damage caused in 2017 was extensive, affecting the electricity, potable water supplies, transportation, and communication, but significant progress had been made in the capital by April 2019, and particularly by October 2019. This was significant for tourism, which had rebounded by October of that year and was close to the pre-Maria era.

San Juan today remains an important cultural, financial and industrial center not only of Puerto Rico but of the Caribbean region. As the biggest industrial center of Puerto Rico, it is the home of industries such as tobacco processors, breweries, refining facilities for petroleum and sugar, and distillers of rum as well as manufacturers of metal products, cement, pharmaceuticals, and clothing. The Puerto Rico Convention Center, opened in 2005, is the largest of its kind in the Caribbean and one of the most advanced in the Americas.

== Geography ==
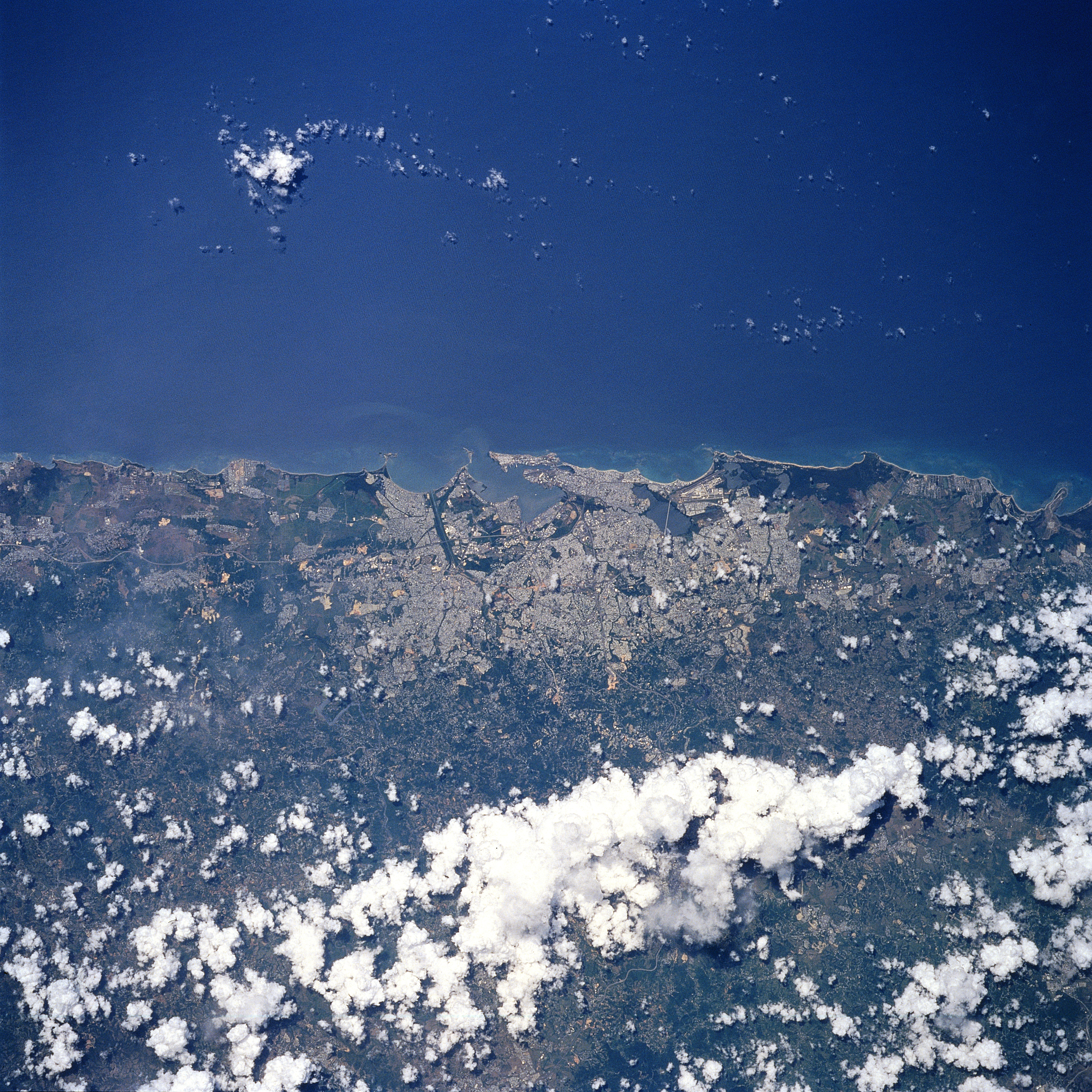
San Juan and its metropolitan area from space

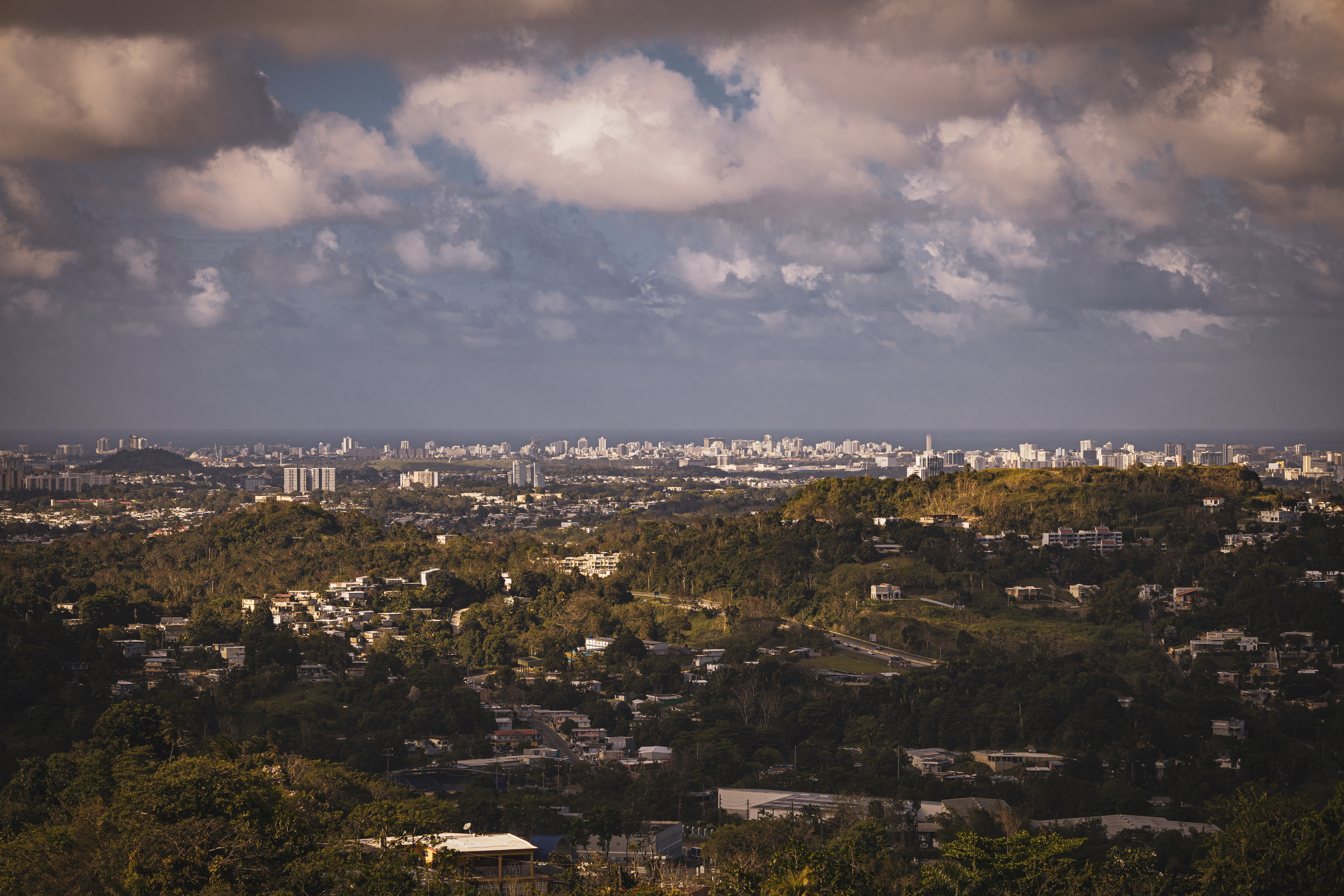
San Juan from Mamey, Guaynabo.

San Juan is located along the north-eastern coast of Puerto Rico in the Northern Plains region. It lies south of the Atlantic Ocean; north of Caguas and Trujillo Alto; east of Guaynabo; and west of Carolina. The city occupies an area of 76.93 square miles (199.2 km^{2}), of which, 29.11 square miles (75.4 km^{2}) (37.83%) is water. San Juan's main water bodies are San Juan Bay and two natural lagoons, the Condado and San José.

At almost 1,030 feet (314 m) above sea level, the highest point in the municipality of San Juan is located on an unnamed hill on the Morcelo sector of Caimito, close to the municipal border with Caguas.

The municipality of San Juan is surrounded by the San Juan metropolitan area, particularly the highly urbanized municipalities of Guaynabo, Trujillo Alto and Carolina. These municipalities, together with Bayamón and Cataño, form what is locally referred to as the Área Metro, the core of the wider San Juan metropolitan area. In total 41 municipalities are included in the entire metropolitan area extends throughout the island's northern coast and central eastern regions.

=== Climate ===
Climate chart for San Juan

San Juan has a tropical monsoon climate (Am) with year-round growing season. It has an average temperature of 81.0 °F (27.2 °C). Temperatures of 90 °F (32 °C) or higher are seen on an average 79 days annually, more commonly occurring during the wetter months of the northern summer, especially if the winds come from the south.

In the winter, temperatures can drop to around 60 °F (16 °C). The average winter low is 71 °F (22 °C). The coolest temperature officially recorded was 60 °F (16 °C) on March 3, 1957, and the hottest was 98 °F (37 °C) on October 9, 1981. The record cold daily maximum is 71 °F (22 °C) on February 4, 1935. The record warm daily minimum is 83 °F (28 °C) on November 14, 2026, the most recent of at least fifteen occasions.

With a mean minimum of 67 °F (19 C), San Juan is in USDA plant hardiness zone 13B, which is the highest category. Rainfall is well-distributed throughout the year. The months of January, February, and March are the driest. As March averages just 1.95 inches (49.5 mm) of rain, the city falls under the tropical monsoon category.

Rainfall averages 56.35 inches (1,431.3 mm), falling on an average of 161 days per year (13.4 monthly). Despite this dampness, the city averages 2,970 hours of sunshine per year, or just over 2/3 of the possible total. Annual rainfall has historically ranged from 35.53 in (902 mm) in 1991 to 89.50 in (2,273 mm) in 2010.

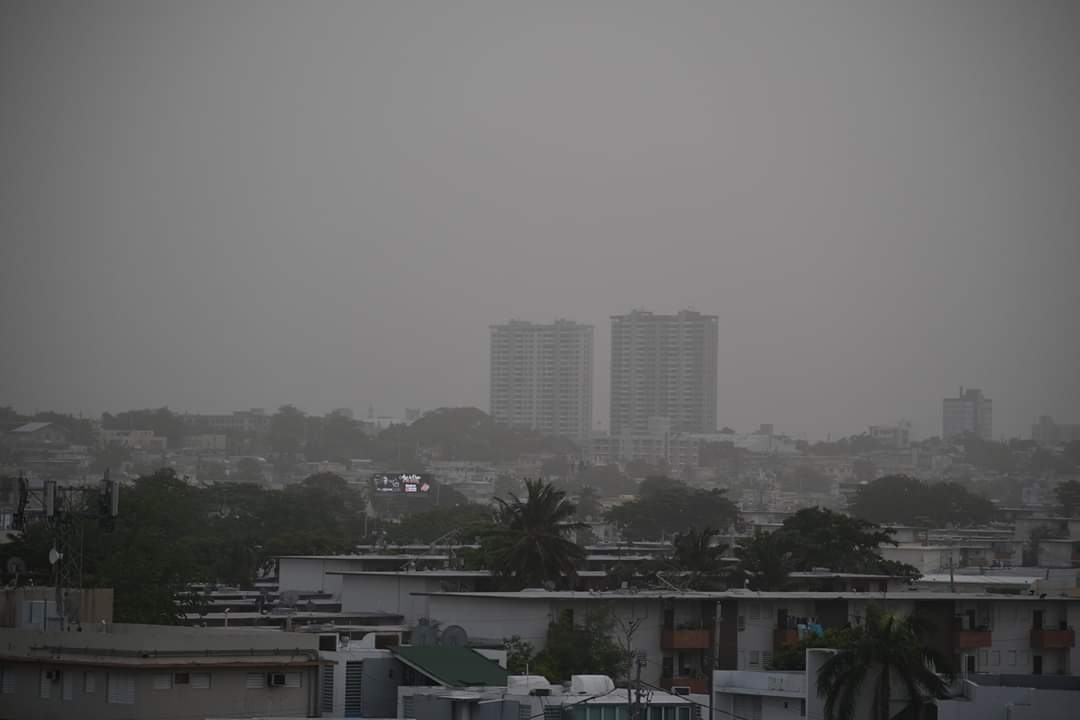
June 2022 haze event caused by Saharan dust.

As with other parts of Puerto Rico and the Caribbean, San Juan is often blanketed by waves of Saharan dust coming from the Sahara across the Atlantic Ocean in Northern Africa. Although beneficial to the tropical environment, these dust storms have recently become hazardous to human health causing haze and overheating in urban areas of the island. Due to San Juan's relatively flat geography, the dust often settles in these flat coastal regions of Puerto Rico as its flow is blocked by the higher altitude Cordillera Central to the south, causing intense episodes of haze to settle for long periods of time, especially during periods of more scarce rainfall. Recent advancements include early warning systems to prepare the population for these intense episodes by both local authorities and the EPA.

==== Hurricane Maria ====
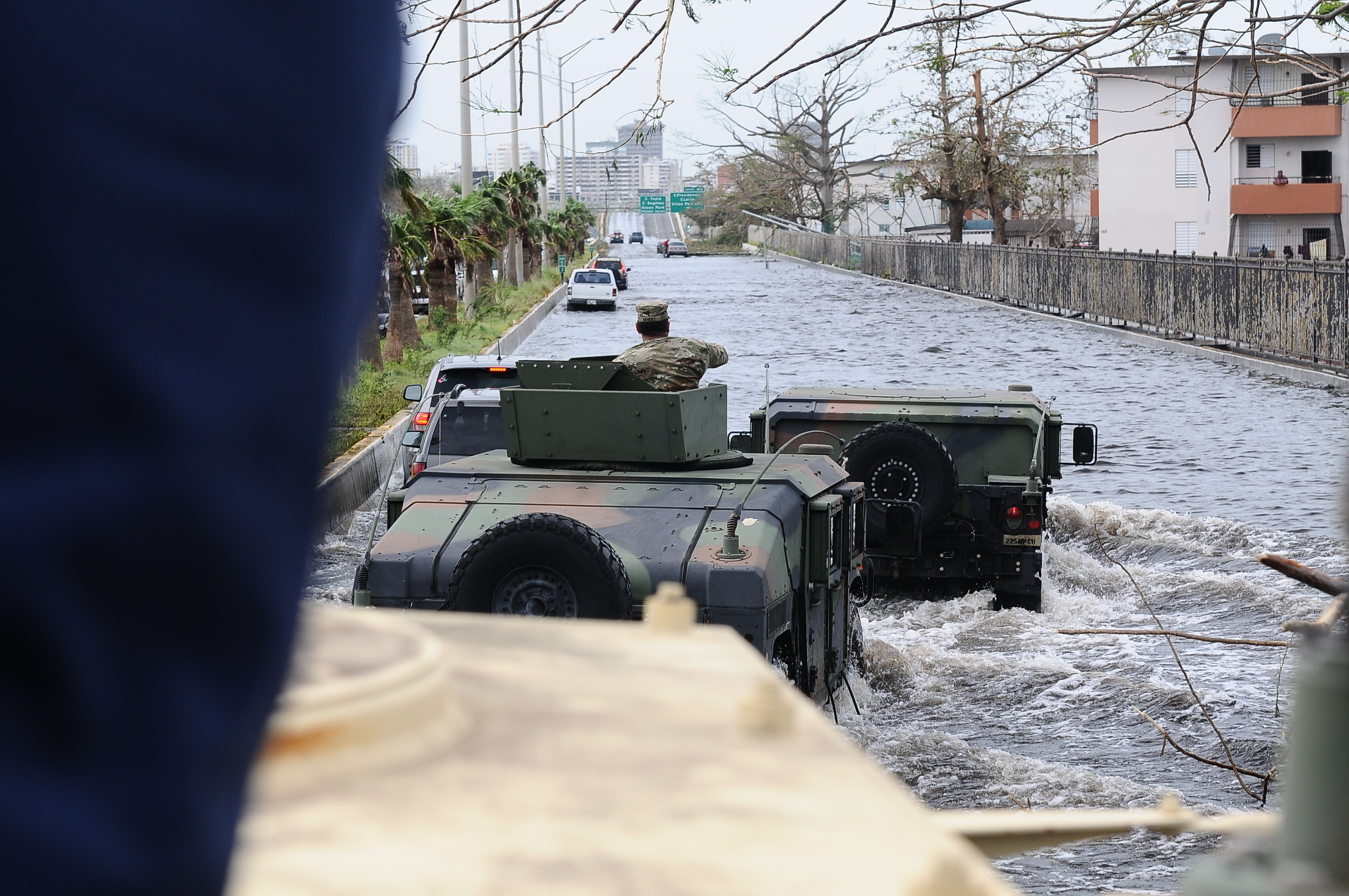
Department of Defense vehicles traveling through a major highway in San Juan flooded with the Hurricane Maria rainfall

Hurricane Maria made landfall in southeastern Puerto Rico on September 20, 2017. Gusts of up to 113 mph (182 km/h) were reported in the capital city shortly before landfall in the municipality of Yabucoa. The municipality of San Juan experienced widespread flooding in most coastal areas, and roofs were blown off from numerous structures. The neighborhood of La Perla was largely destroyed. In the wider metropolitan area, flooding from Lake La Plata produced flash floods that trapped residents of Toa Baja, and in Cataño the Juana Matos neighborhood was estimated to be 80% destroyed. At least eight people died from the flooding, while many were unaccounted for.

Climate data for San Juan, Puerto Rico (Luis Muñoz Marín International Airport), 1991–2020 normals, (Note: Mean monthly maxima and minima (i.e. the expected highest and lowest temperature readings at any point during the year or given month) calculated based on data at said location from 1991 to 2020.) extremes 1898–present (Note: Official records for San Juan were kept at downtown from November 1898 to December 1955 and at Luis Muñoz Marín International Airport since January 1956.)
Month	Jan	Feb	Mar	Apr	May	Jun	Jul	Aug	Sep	Oct	Nov	Dec	Year
Record high °F (°C)	92 (33)	96 (36)	96 (36)	97 (36)	96 (36)	97 (36)	95 (35)	97 (36)	97 (36)	98 (37)	96 (36)	94 (34)	98 (37)
Mean maximum °F (°C)	87.5 (30.8)	88.2 (31.2)	90.0 (32.2)	91.7 (33.2)	92.3 (33.5)	92.7 (33.7)	92.0 (33.3)	92.8 (33.8)	93.7 (34.3)	92.7 (33.7)	90.3 (32.4)	88.0 (31.1)	94.3 (34.6)
Mean daily maximum °F (°C)	83.2 (28.4)	83.8 (28.8)	84.7 (29.3)	86.2 (30.1)	87.4 (30.8)	89.0 (31.7)	88.7 (31.5)	89.1 (31.7)	89.2 (31.8)	88.6 (31.4)	86.1 (30.1)	84.2 (29.0)	86.7 (30.4)
Daily mean °F (°C)	77.6 (25.3)	77.8 (25.4)	78.6 (25.9)	80.1 (26.7)	81.6 (27.6)	83.1 (28.4)	83.1 (28.4)	83.5 (28.6)	83.4 (28.6)	82.7 (28.2)	80.5 (26.9)	78.8 (26.0)	80.9 (27.2)
Mean daily minimum °F (°C)	71.9 (22.2)	71.8 (22.1)	72.4 (22.4)	74.0 (23.3)	75.7 (24.3)	77.2 (25.1)	77.6 (25.3)	77.8 (25.4)	77.5 (25.3)	76.7 (24.8)	74.9 (23.8)	73.3 (22.9)	75.1 (23.9)
Mean minimum °F (°C)	68.3 (20.2)	68.7 (20.4)	69.2 (20.7)	70.7 (21.5)	72.1 (22.3)	74.0 (23.3)	74.1 (23.4)	74.2 (23.4)	74.3 (23.5)	73.7 (23.2)	71.7 (22.1)	70.0 (21.1)	67.8 (19.9)
Record low °F (°C)	61 (16)	62 (17)	60 (16)	64 (18)	66 (19)	66 (19)	69 (21)	68 (20)	69 (21)	67 (19)	65 (18)	62 (17)	60 (16)
Average precipitation inches (mm)	4.07 (103)	2.58 (66)	2.18 (55)	4.60 (117)	5.54 (141)	4.66 (118)	6.02 (153)	6.29 (160)	6.50 (165)	5.21 (132)	7.37 (187)	4.85 (123)	59.87 (1,521)
Average precipitation days (≥ 0.01 in)	12	10	10	12	14	15	15	15	16	15	14	13	161
Average relative humidity (%)	74.0	72.4	71.0	71.3	74.9	75.5	75.9	76.4	76.4	76.9	76.2	74.7	74.6
Average dew point °F (°C)	67.1 (19.5)	66.6 (19.2)	66.7 (19.3)	68.2 (20.1)	71.1 (21.7)	72.9 (22.7)	73.4 (23.0)	73.6 (23.1)	73.2 (22.9)	72.7 (22.6)	70.9 (21.6)	68.5 (20.3)	70.4 (21.3)
Mean monthly sunshine hours	237.4	231.2	282.0	268.3	255.2	259.4	280.8	267.8	234.7	227.2	202.4	217.4	2,963.8
Percentage possible sunshine	69	72	76	71	63	65	69	68	64	63	60	64	67
Average ultraviolet index	8	10	12	12	12	12	12	12	12	10	9	8	11
Source 1: NOAA (relative humidity and sun 1961–1990)
Source 2: The Weather Channel, Weather Atlas (UV)

See or edit raw graph data.

=== Beaches ===
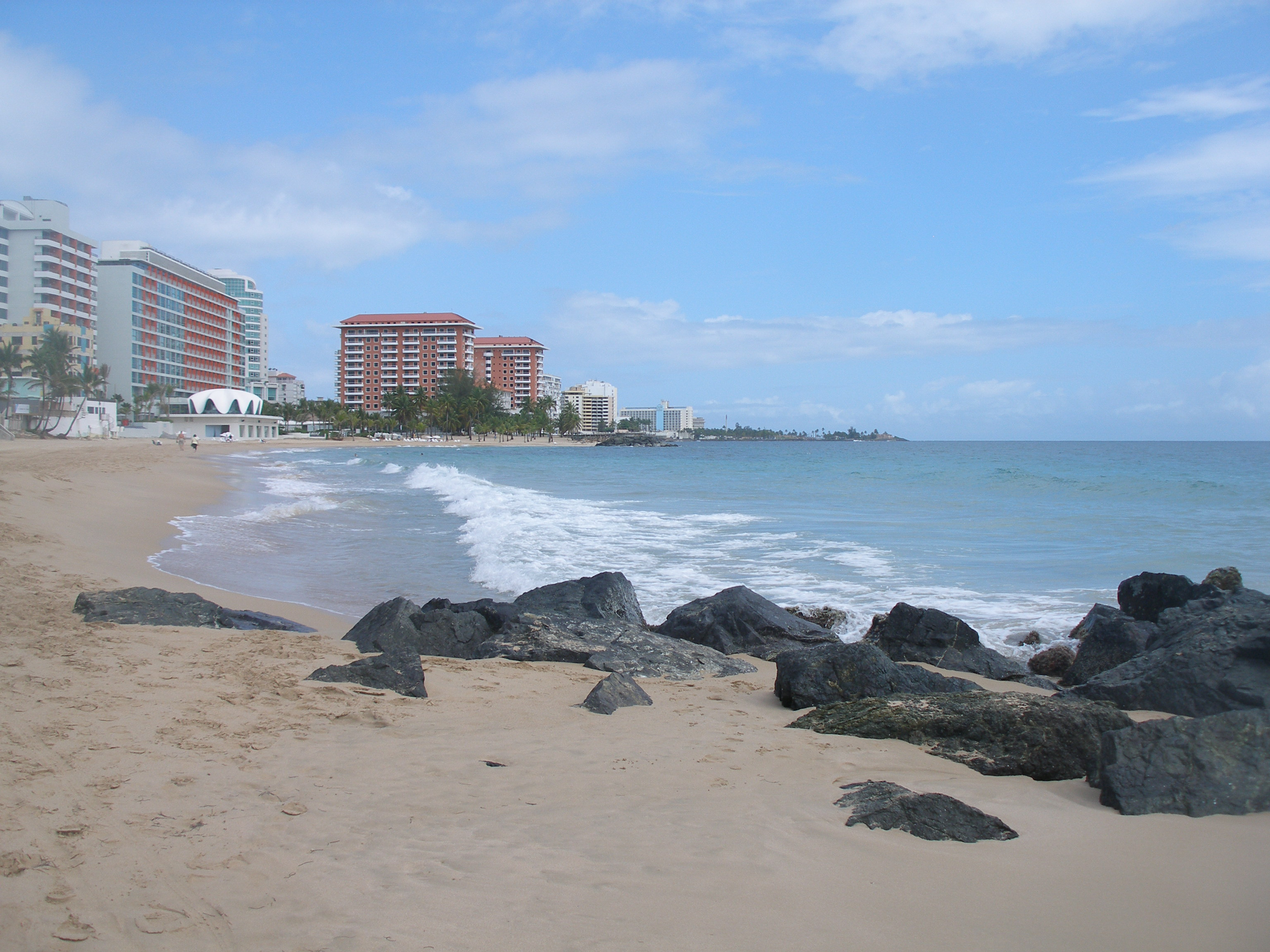
Condado Beach

San Juan is home to numerous beaches, all of which are open to the public. All beaches of San Juan face the Atlantic Ocean. The Islet of San Juan hosts Los Cables Beach and La Perla Beach next to the Old San Juan district of La Perla, the Capitolio Beach located immediately north of the Puerto Rico Capitol, Puerta de Tierra Beach along the Paseo de Puerta de Tierra, and El Escambrón Beach at the northeastern edge of the islet. The latter is the most popular beach in the islet due to its shore being protected from the strong Atlantic Ocean waves by reefs that serve as natural breakwaters. From east to west, the beaches in Santurce include Ocean Park Beach (also known as Último Trolley Beach), Condado Beach and Playita del Condado. Ocean Park Beach and El Condado Beach are the largest in the city and they host a large number of hotels and businesses that cater to tourists and beachgoers.

==== Beach erosion ====
As with other beaches across Puerto Rico and the Caribbean, the beaches of San Juan are currently under the threat of coastal erosion, particularly that of Ocean Park. The threat has become more evident recently and there are currently no state reports dedicated to the documentation or mitigation planning, according to oceanographer and geologist Maritza Barreto.

=== Parks ===
The municipality of San Juan contains numerous parks, including public parks, historic and heritage parks, nature reserves, protected natural areas, and recreational parks. These parks are managed by a number of entities such as the Municipality, the Puerto Rico Department of Natural and Environmental Resources, the National Park Service, the University of Puerto Rico and conservation easements.

==== San Juan Ecological Corridor ====
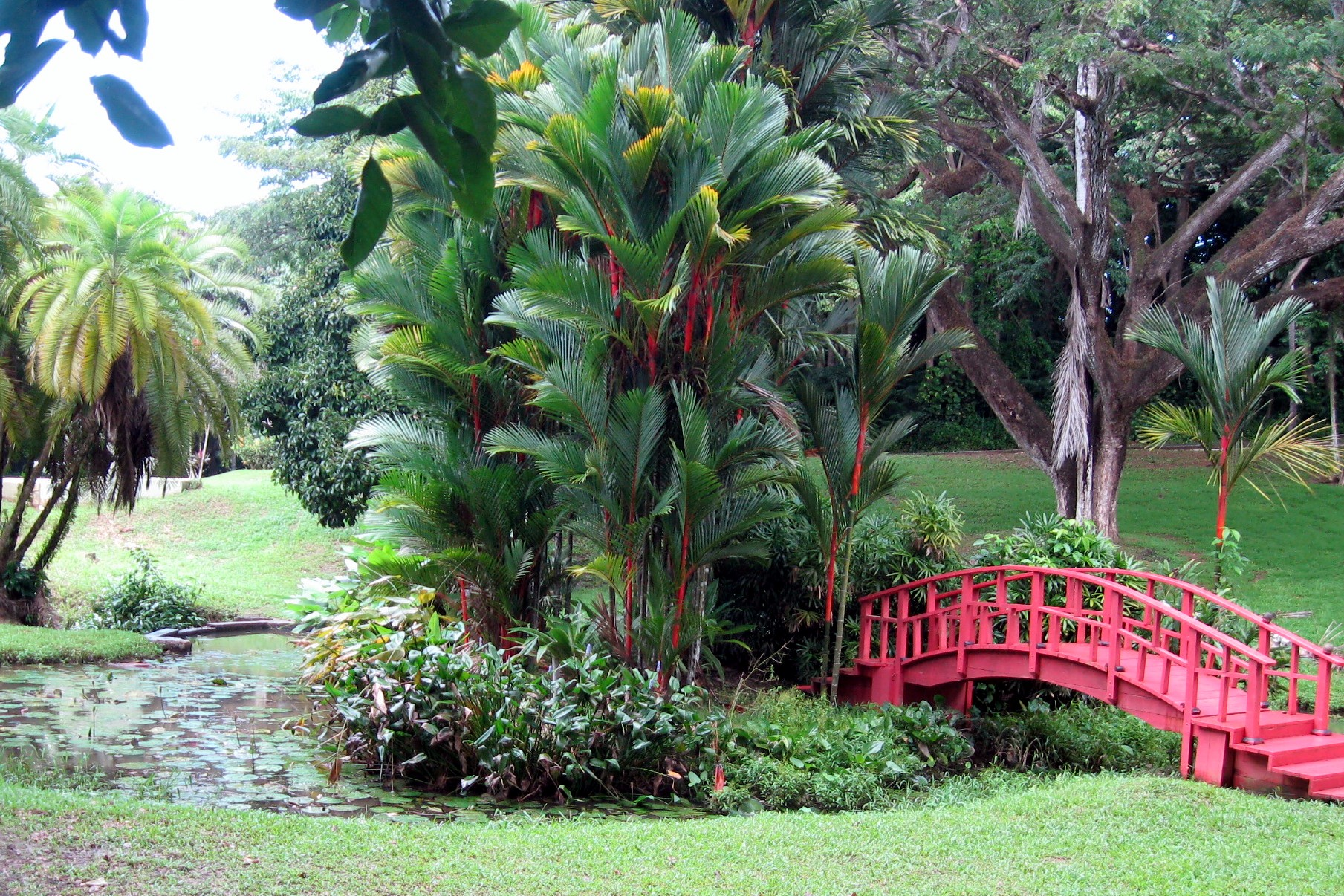
University of Puerto Rico Botanical Garden

The San Juan Ecological Corridor is a conservation project by the Government of Puerto Rico consisting in 6 different units found within the municipality of San Juan: the Cupey Arboretum, which protects the riparian ecosystems along the Río Piedras; the Doña Inés Mendoza Urban Forest, a small urban forest located next to the Luis Muñoz Marín Foundation in Sabana Llana Sur; Los Capuchinos Forest, a forest which covers a small karst area also in Sabana Llana Sur; the New Millennium State Forest, one of the 20 state forests of Puerto Rico; the San Juan Waterworks, consisting of the Old Piedras River Aqueduct and adjacent historic district; and the University of Puerto Rico Botanical Garden, also known as the San Juan Botanical Garden.

==== Historical parks ====
The San Juan National Historic Site is home to El Morro Esplanade, a large open area located between El Morro and Ballajá in Old San Juan. The esplanade is located in the promontory which gives El Morro its name and it offers views of the San Juan Bay and the rest of San Juan. It is very popular for activities such as picnics, stargazing and kite flying.

The district of the Capitol of Puerto Rico is home to the Iglesias Pantín and Rafael Hernández Marín parks, and a line of monuments located along Constitución Avenue which includes the Walkway of the Presidents, the Puerto Rico Police Memorial Monument and The Holocaust Memorial Monument. The Loma de los Vientos, or Loma del Viento (Spanish for "hill of winds"), is a small open green area located northwest of the Capitol, next to Castle San Cristóbal, and it often hosts events such as the Epiphany celebrations.

Luis Muñoz Rivera Park is a 27.2 acre recreational and historic park located in Puerta de Tierra, between Luis Muñoz Rivera, Ponce de León and Constitución avenues. It is the largest public square in Puerto Rico, and it is home to several historic sites such as the Polvorín San Gerónimo de Boquerón, which used to supply gunpowder to the nearby Fortín de San Gerónimo. The park used to host a small zoo, and currently hosts gazebos, gardens, restaurants and access to the beach. The park has been listed on the National Register of Historic Places since November 14, 2007.

The Polvorin de Miraflores is a historic district and park located next to the Puerto Rico Convention Center in Isla Grande, Santurce. The ammunition storage house dates to the mid-18th century and it is also listed on the National Register of Historic Places.

Another historic district currently under revitalization is the San Juan Waterworks historic district which contains the Old Piedras River Aqueduct. There are plans to revitalize the old aqueduct structures and its surroundings to create a historic park open to visitors and researchers.

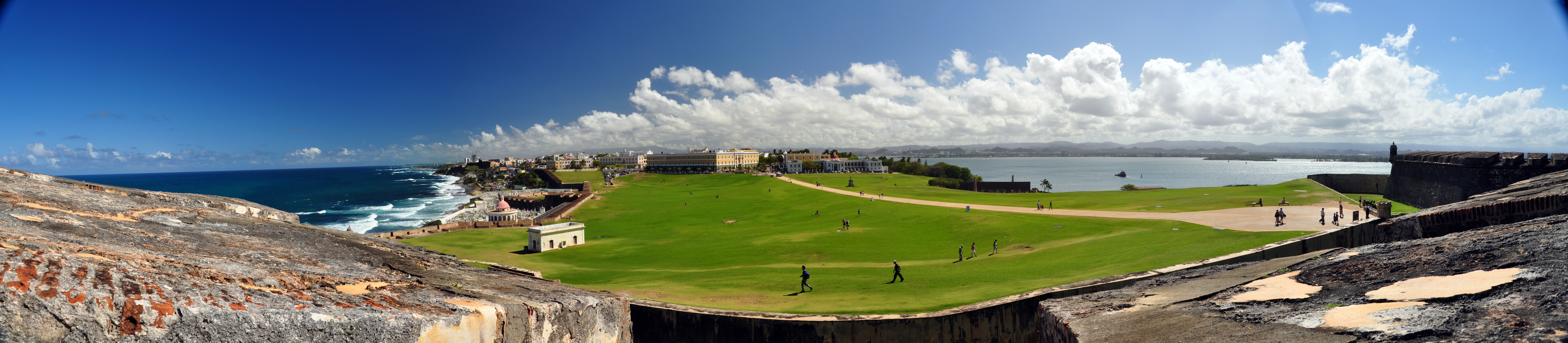
El Morro Esplanade as seen from the castle walls.

==== Municipal parks ====
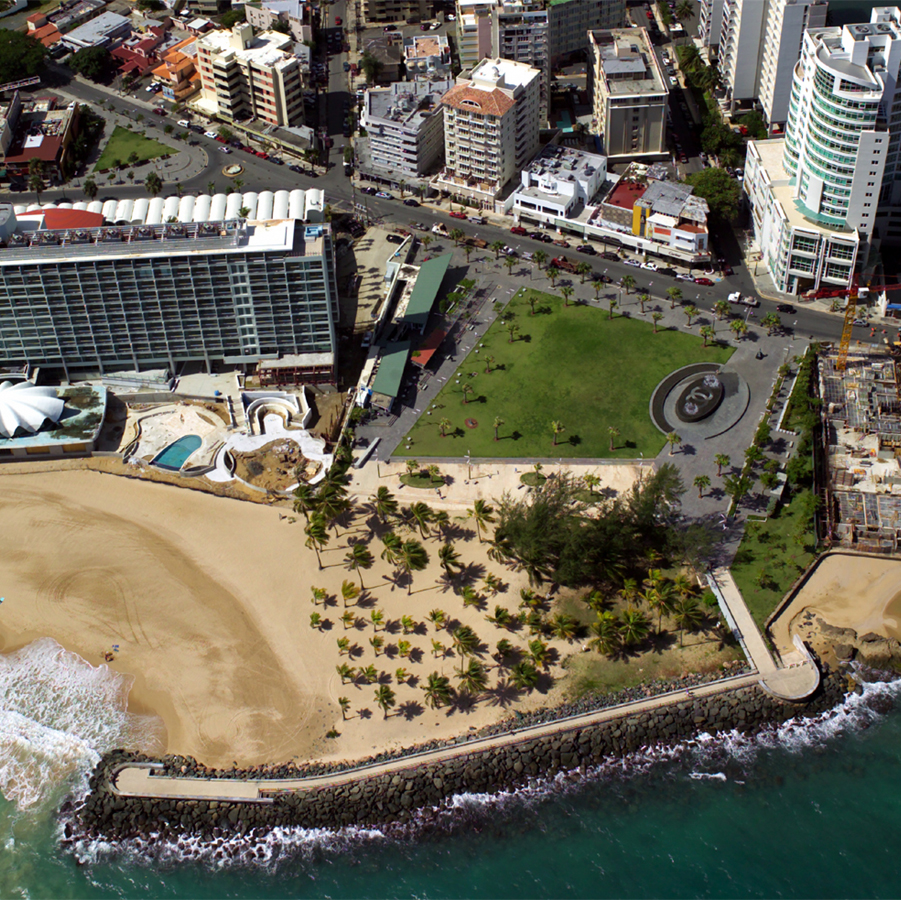
Aerial view of Ventana al Mar

Some of the recreational parks of the municipality include Bahía Urbana, a waterfront park located in Old San Juan and Puerta de Tierra by the San Juan Bay; the Paseo de Puerta de Tierra, a recreational walkway along the Atlantic Ocean cliffs of Puerta de Tierra that connects the Puerto Rico Capitol with El Escambrón Beach and Luis Muñoz Rivera Park.

Ventana al Mar, Laguna del Condado Jaime Benítez Park, Parque del Indio are some of the parks located in El Condado district of Santurce. Dr. José Celso Barbosa Park is located in Ocean Park, also in Santurce. Parque Central, also known as the San Juan Municipal Central Park, is a large park and recreational complex located in southern Santurce near the mouth of the Puerto Nuevo River and the Martín Peña Channel. The Enrique Martí Coll Linear Park connects the Central Park to Hato Rey through the Caño Martín Peña Nature Reserve.

Luis Muñoz Marín Park, La Merced Park, Dr. José N. Gándara Park, Santiago Iglesias Pantín Park are some of the parks located in Hato Rey. Luis Muñoz Marín Park is one of the largest in the municipality. It is located in the Gobernador Piñero district between Hato Rey and Puerto Nuevo. The park has gazebos that can be rented for events, green areas for strolls, biking and picnics, an artificial lake with paddleboats for rent ($6), and a number of playgrounds for children. Its main attraction is the cableway that crosses the park and offers scenic views of the Piedras River and the city while providing transportation to the Roberto Clemente Coliseum and the Hiram Bithorn Stadium.

==== Nature reserves ====
The municipality of San Juan is home to various important ecosystems and preserved natural areas. Some of the ecosystems of the San Juan Bay National Estuary, which is the only tropical estuary in the National Estuary Program network, are protected by numerous nature reserves and protected areas such as the Caño Martín Peña Nature Reserve. Other areas protected under the San Juan Bay National Estuary include El Condado Lagoon, the San José Lagoon and El Boquerón where the San Antonio Creek and the Condado Lagoon connect with the Atlantic Ocean.

Two of the 20 state forests of Puerto Rico are located in the municipality of San Juan: the New Millennium Urban Forest, which is also part of the San Juan Ecological Corridor, and the San Patricio Urban Forest, a secondary forest located next to a mogote. The Hermanas Sendra and San Juan Park Protected Natural Areas are located inland within the municipality of San Juan in the barrios of Caimito and Cupey.

== Cityscape ==
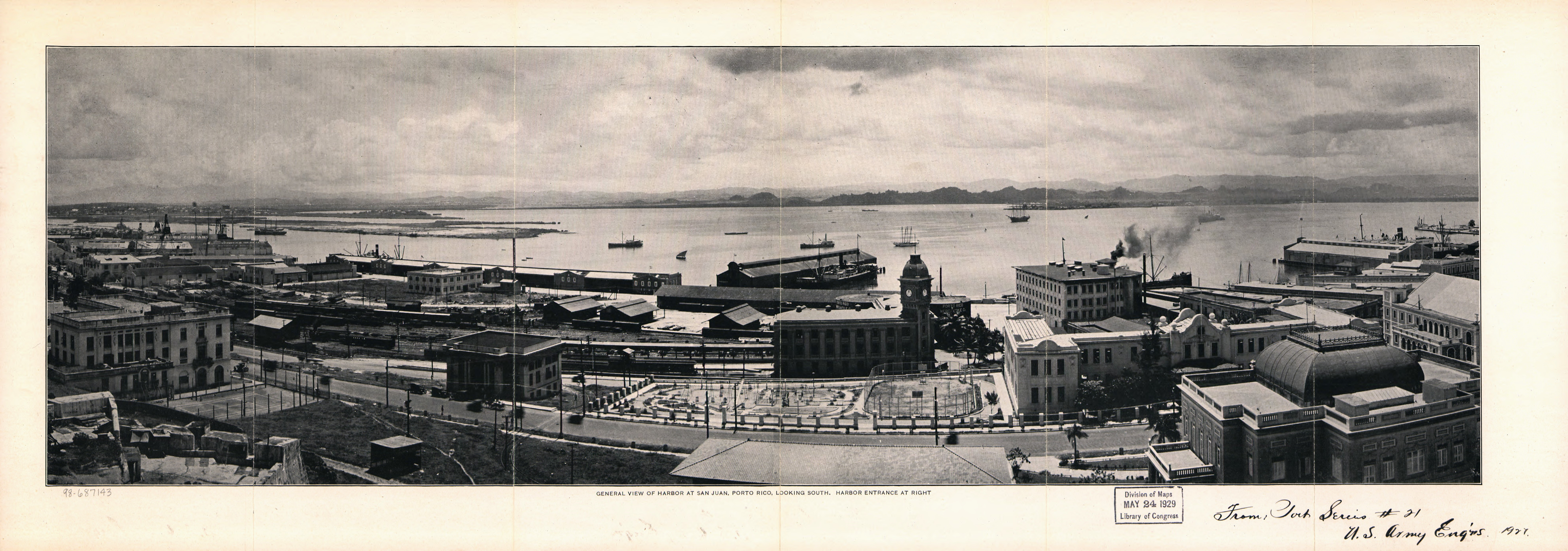
General view of harbor at San Juan, Puerto Rico looking South to San Juan Bay, 1927. The clock tower building at center was the San Juan Rail Terminal.

=== Architecture ===
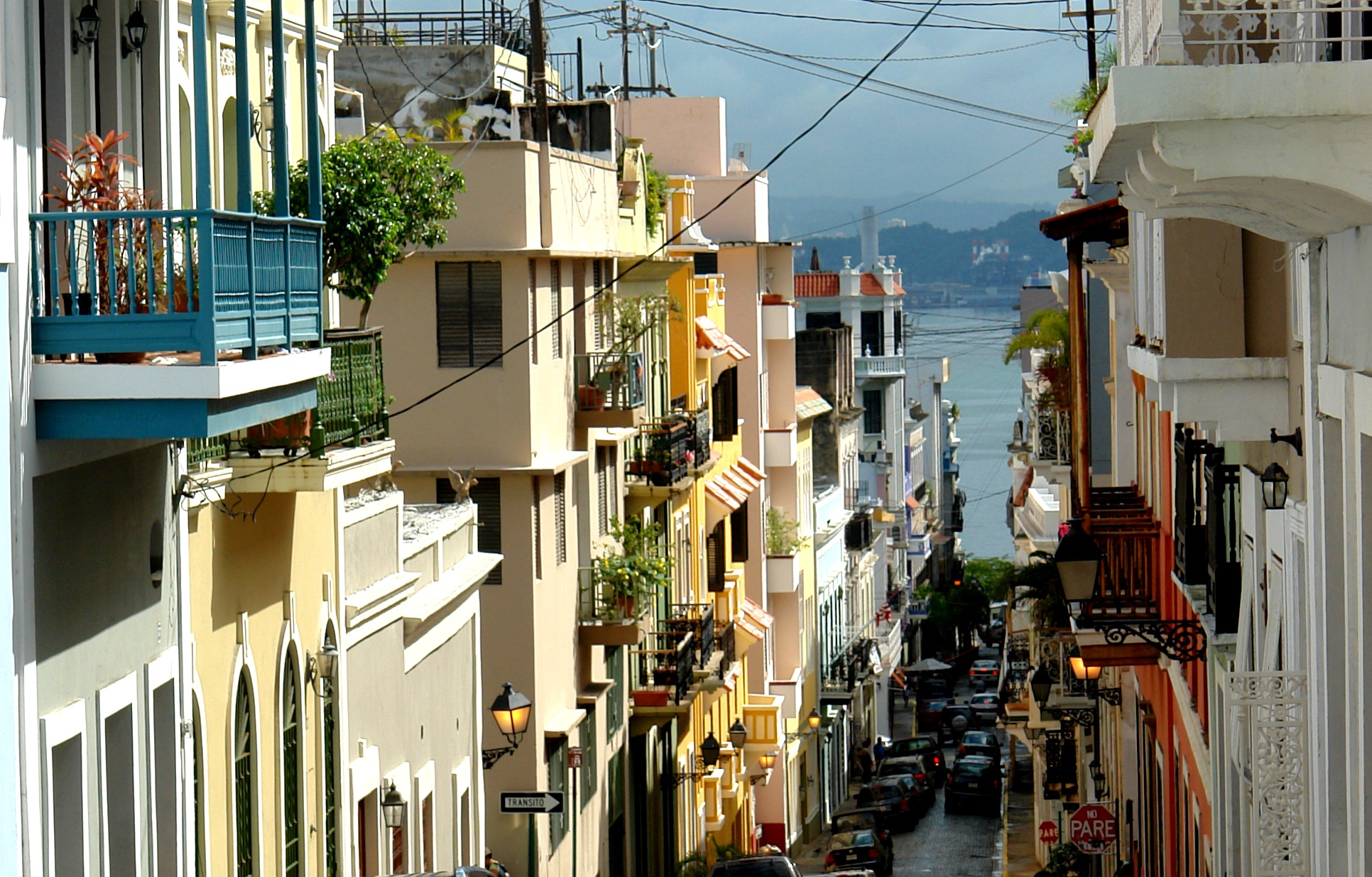
Old San Juan

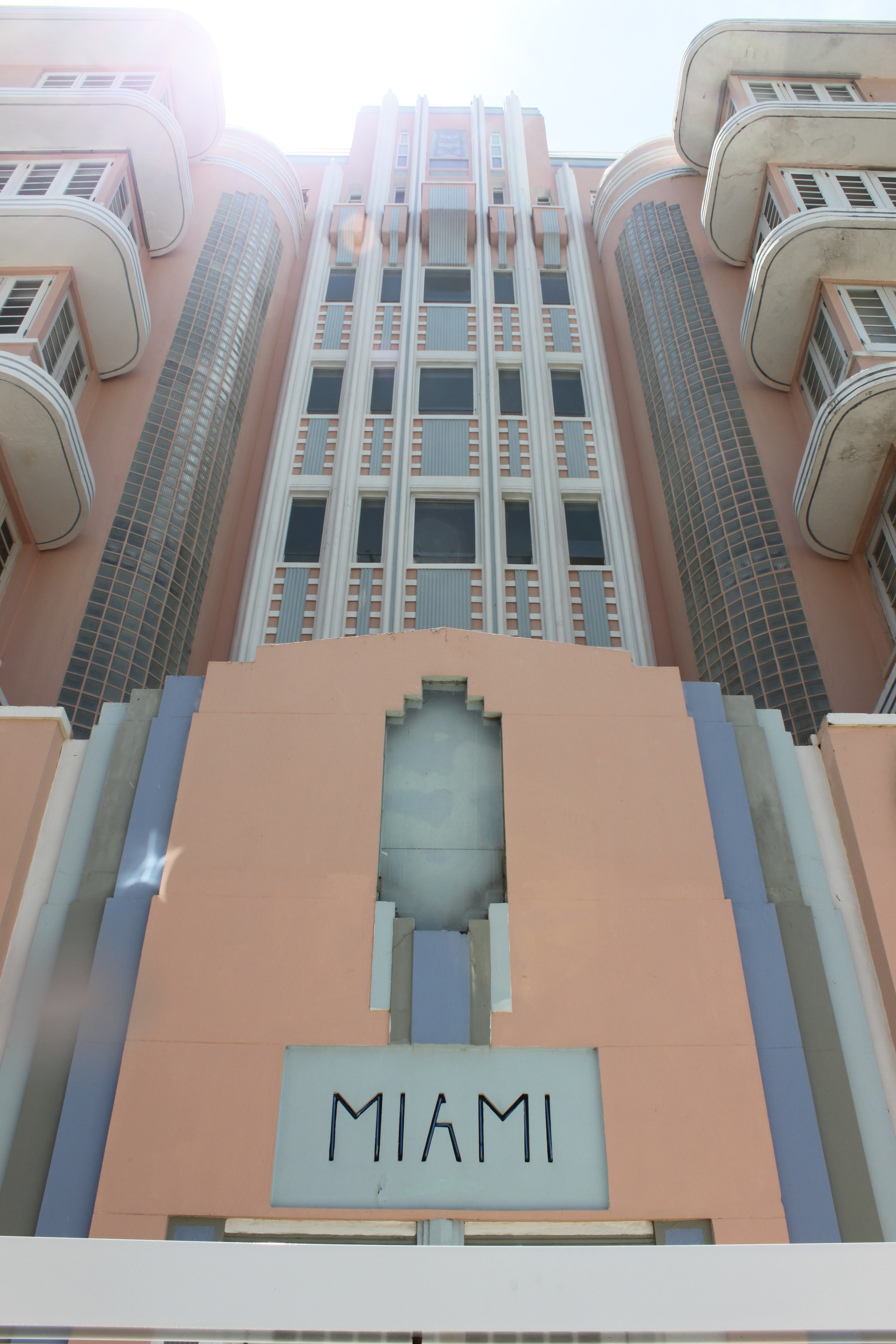
The Art Deco Miami Building on Ashford Ave in Condado.

The architecture of San Juan is very diverse, due to its size and all the cultural influences received during its existence. The oldest part of the city, known as Old San Juan, mostly features the influence of Spanish architecture. This part of the city is comprised by a network of "setted" roads usually surrounded by colonial, two-storied houses built on masonry. Some colonial structures have been restored and serve either as government offices or museums. Some examples are the Ballajá Barracks, which now serve as museum and headquarters of several cultural organizations; La Fortaleza, which has served as the residence of the Governor of Puerto Rico since the 16th Century; and the Ancient Welfare Asylum, which now houses the Institute of Puerto Rican Culture, among others. Old San Juan also features several public squares, like the Plaza de Armas, located in front of San Juan City Hall; and cathedrals, like the Cathedral of San Juan Bautista. Old San Juan is also notable for being partly enclosed by massive walls and fortifications built by the Spanish government. The colonial Walls of the city of San Juan had five gates. The main was the Puerta de San Juan, today preserved, built in 1635. It also had the Puerta de San José, the Puerta de Santa Rosa, the Puerta de San Justo and the Puerta de Santiago, the latter built between 1635 and 1641 by Spanish Captain General Íñigo de la Mota Sarmiento.

The architecture is more varied in other districts of the city, and the different Spanish, American and Puerto Rican construction styles that reflect the historic architecture trends are most evident in the districts of Puerta de Tierra, Santurce, Hato Rey and downtown Río Piedras, with Gothic, Baroque, Art Deco, and Mid-Century Modern being the most popular styles. Many of the buildings that best exemplify these architectural trends in San Juan are also inscribed in the United States National Register of Historic Places (NRHP), such as the Nuestra Señora de Lourdes Chapel (Gothic Revival, 1907), the Antiguo Casino de Puerto Rico (Beaux-Arts, 1917), the Normandie Hotel (Art Deco, 1942), and the Puerto Rico Supreme Court Building (Modern, 1955). The University of Puerto Rico, Río Piedras Campus is also home to a rich variety of buildings that showcase the history of Puerto Rican architecture throughout the past 120 years, with buildings designed by notable architects such as Frank Lloyd Wright's student Henry Klumb, Edward H. Bennett, William E. Parsons, and Rafael Carmoega who designed the distinctive clock tower and the university quadrangle, both of which were inscribed in the NRHP in 1984.

=== Barrios ===
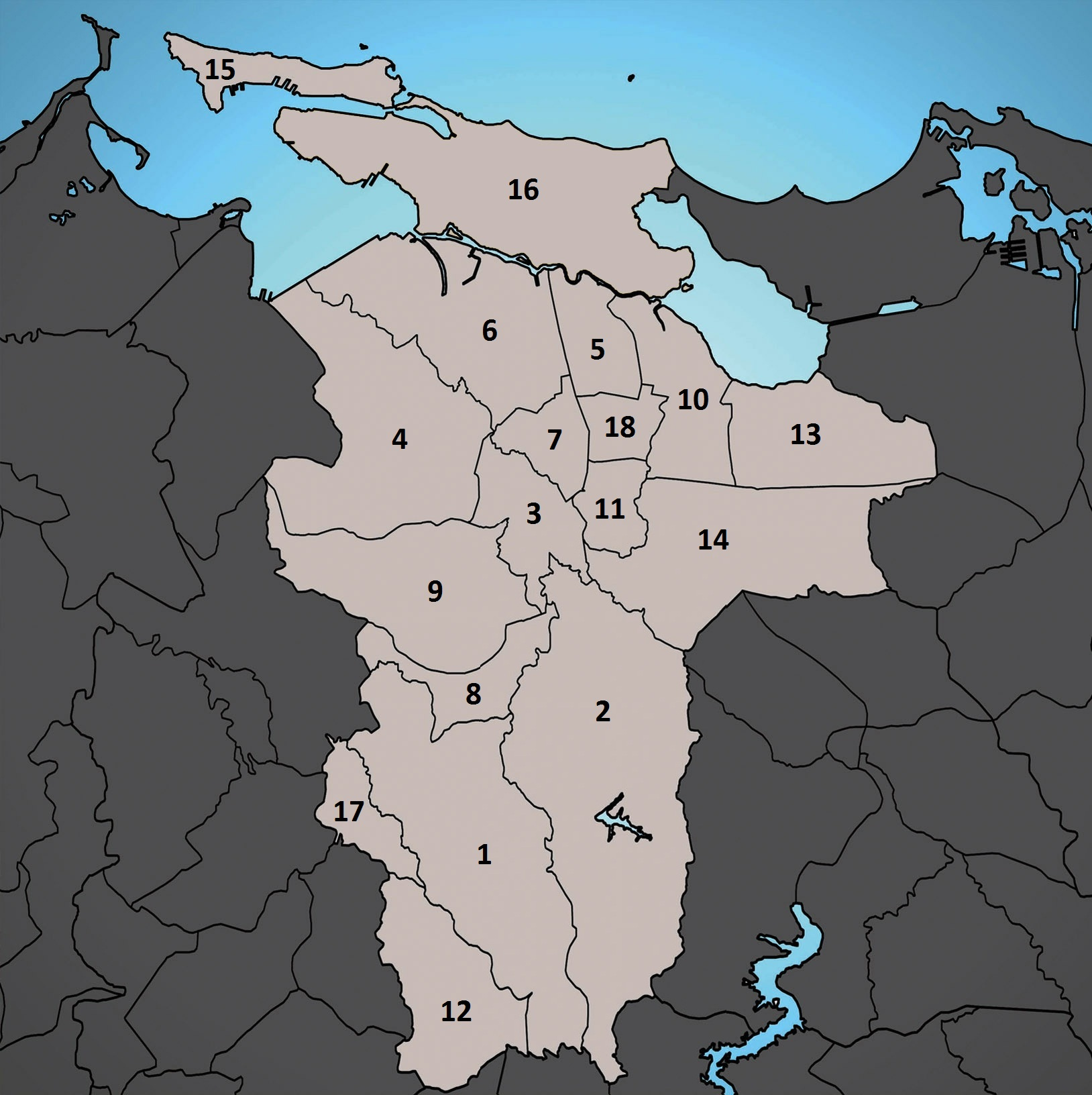
The subdivisions of San Juan

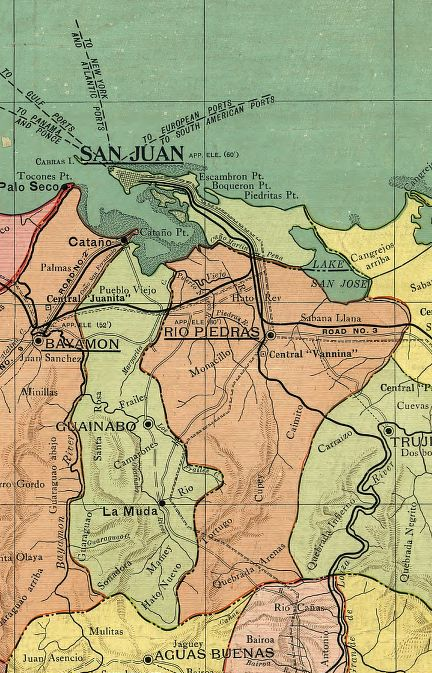
San Juan and Rio Piedras as separate municipalities on a 1915 map

As with the other Puerto Rican municipalities, San Juan is administratively divided into barrios. What is now known as Old San Juan occupied the western end of a rocky islet, the Isleta de San Juan, at the mouth of San Juan Bay. During the 20th century, the main population centers surged well beyond the walls of the old city and onto Puerto Rico's main island and merged with the existing settlements east and south of Old San Juan. Together with Puerta de Tierra, Old San Juan comprises the barrio of San Juan Antiguo.

With the annexation of Río Piedras in 1951, the municipality of San Juan grew to four times its previous size. As a result, the municipality also went from 2 to 18 barrios (barrios), 16 of which fall within the former municipality of Río Piedras. Eight of the 18 barrios are further subdivided into subbarrios, including the two barrios (San Juan Antiguo and Santurce) that belonged to the original municipality of San Juan.

The 18 barrios are:

1. Caimito
2. Cupey
3. El Cinco
4. Gobernador Piñero
5. Hato Rey Central
6. Hato Rey Norte
7. Hato Rey Sur
8. Monacillo
9. Monacillo Urbano
10. Oriente
11. Pueblo
12. Quebrada Arenas
13. Sabana Llana Norte
14. Sabana Llana Sur
15. San Juan Antiguo (not to be confused with Old San Juan, a historic district within the barrio)
16. Santurce
17. Tortugo
18. Universidad

==== San Juan Antiguo ====
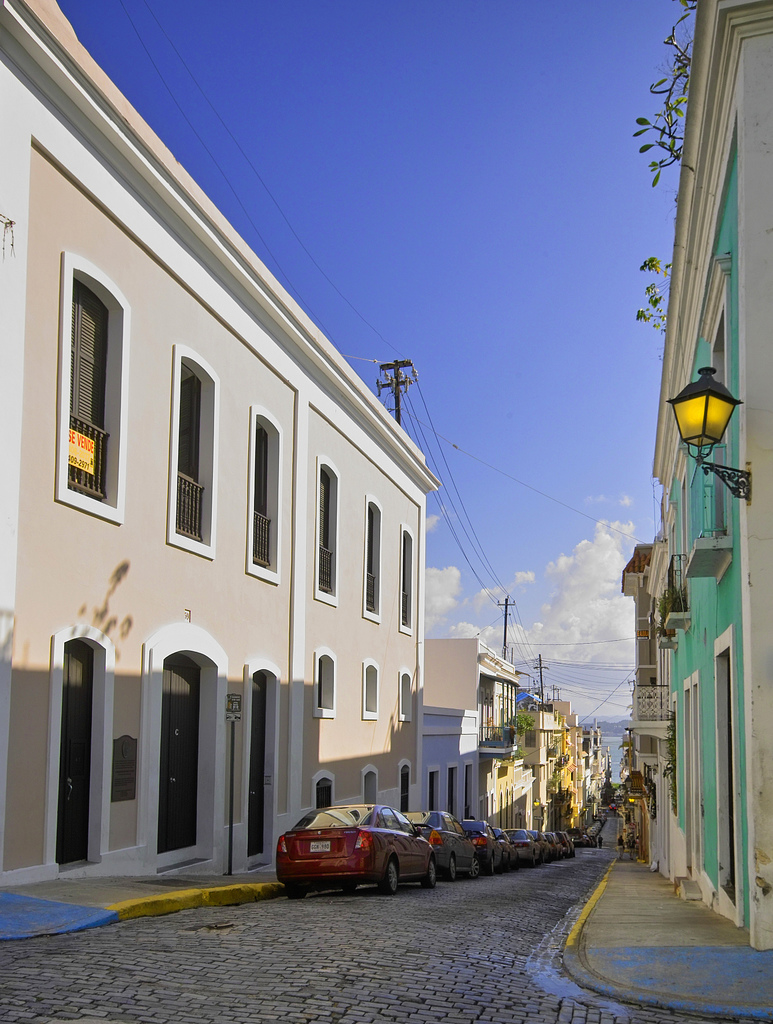
Some streets in Old San Juan are still paved with blue cobblestones from the Spanish colonial era

During the Spanish colonial times most of the urban population resided in what is today known as Old San Juan. This sector is located on the western half of a small island called the Isleta de San Juan, which is connected to the mainland by two bridges and a causeway. The small island, which comprises an area of 47 square miles (120 km^{2}), also hosts the working-class neighborhood of Puerta de Tierra and most of Puerto Rico's central government buildings, including the Commonwealth's Capitol. This is also the largest and most populated subbarrio of San Juan Antiguo.

The main central part of the old city is characterized by narrow streets made of blue cobblestone and picturesque colonial buildings, some of which date back to the 16th and 17th century. Sections of the old city are surrounded by massive walls and several defensive structures and notable forts. These include the 16th-century Fort San Felipe del Morro and the 17th-century Fort San Cristóbal, both part of San Juan National Historic Site, and the 16th-century El Palacio de Santa Catalina, also known as La Fortaleza, which serves as the governor's mansion.

Other buildings of interest predating the 18th century are the Ayuntamiento or Alcaldía (San Juan City Hall), the Diputación Provincial and the Real Intendencia buildings, which house the Puerto Rico Department of State, the Casa Rosa, the San José Church (1523) and the adjacent Hotel El Convento, the former house of the Ponce de León family known as Casa Blanca, the Teatro Tapia, the former Spanish barracks (now Museum of Ballajá), La Princesa (former municipal jail, now headquartering the Puerto Rico Tourism Company), and the Santa María Magdalena de Pazzis Cemetery, located just outside the city walls. The Cathedral of San Juan Bautista (construction began in the 1520s) is also located in Old San Juan and contains the tomb of the Spanish explorer and settlement founder Juan Ponce de León. Old San Juan, also known as the "old city", is the main cultural tourist attraction in Puerto Rico; its bayside is lined by dock slips for large cruise ships.

==== Santurce ====
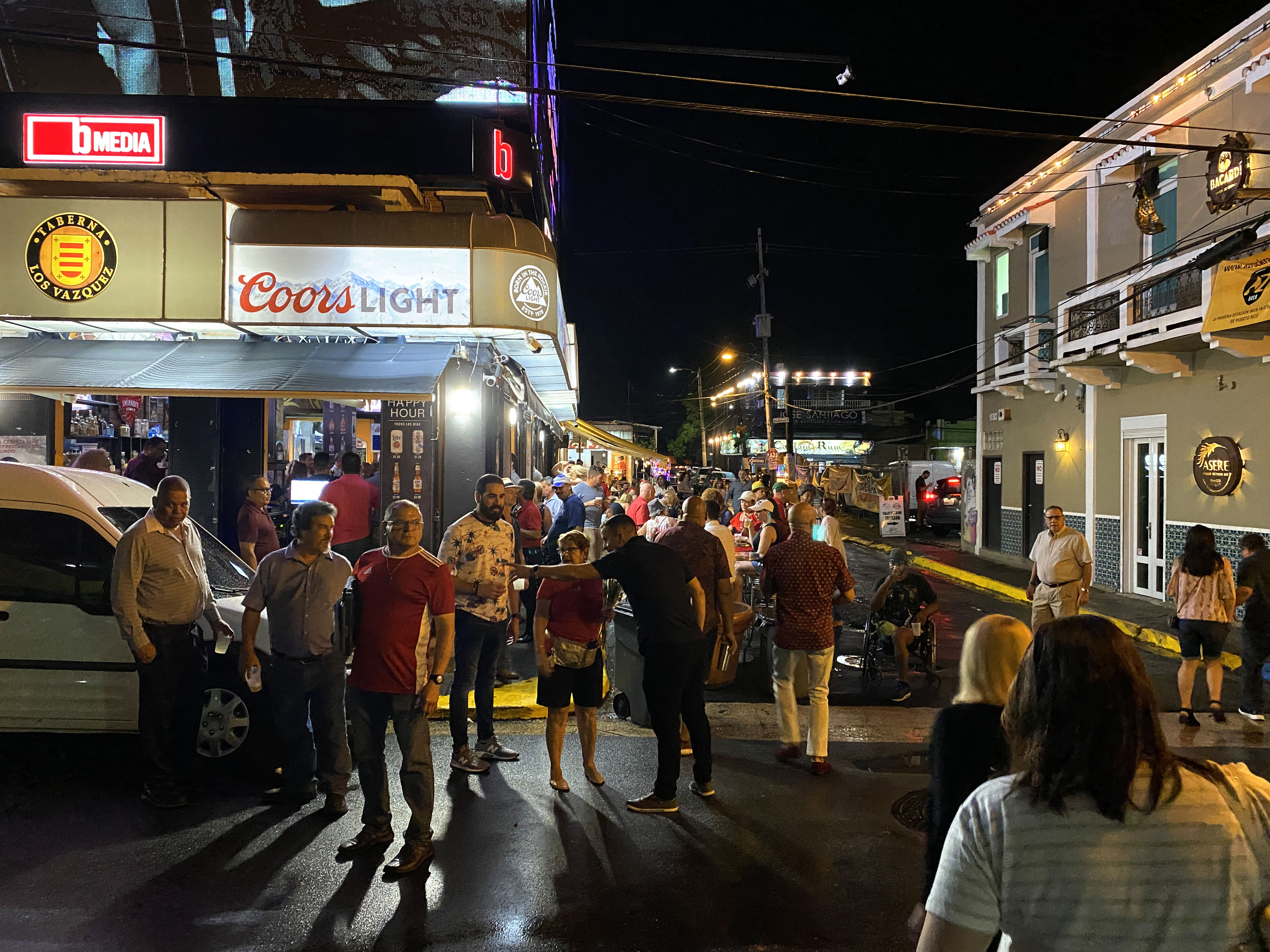
La Placita in Santurce (2020).

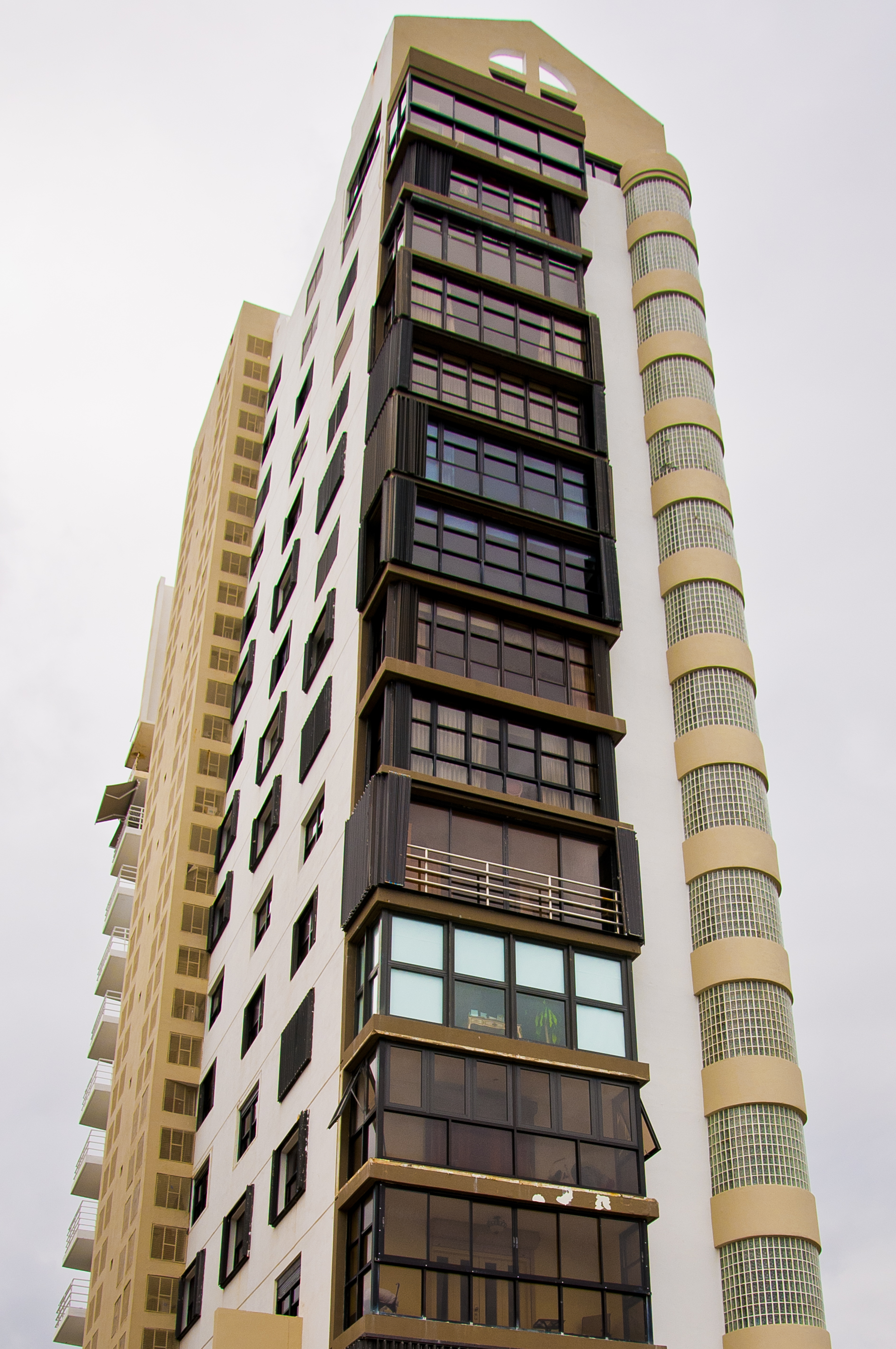
Highrises on Ashford Avenue in El Condado.

Santurce is the largest and most populated barrio in the municipality of San Juan, and one of the most densely populated areas of the island (13,257.4 persons per square mile). Santurce, originally named San Mateo de Cangrejos (Saint Matthew of the Crabs), was a settlement for freed African slaves during the early days of the city. Santurce was a separate town until it was annexed to San Juan in 1863. After Pablo Ubarri Capetillo, a Spanish railroad developer and Count of San José de Santurce under the Spanish colonial period, sought permission to link San Juan with Río Piedras proper via steam tramway in 1878, the time it took to travel between both points were shortened and thereby stimulated the colonization and growth of the district. At the beginning of the twentieth century an electric trolley was installed, the township was split into three parts, and its main settlement, merged with the city, was renamed using the Spanish spelling of Santurtzi (Saint George in Basque), Ubarri's birthplace in Vizcaya, Spain. Puerto Rico Museum of Art and other important cultural venues are located in Santurce.

This barrio is further divided into subbarrios such as the tourist-oriented neighborhood of Condado, which occupies land that used to be owned by Ubarri Capetillo. Beaches such as nearby Ocean Park, popular with swimmers, surfers and kitesurfers, are found all along the district's Atlantic coastline which is also the locus of numerous hotels. Miramar is mainly a residential area rising south of the Condado Lagoon. It comprises the former barrio of Miraflores, as well as drained marshland and landfill over which was built San Juan's first airport, the Isla Grande airport, which was renamed Fernando Luis Ribas Dominicci Airport in honor of Major Fernando Luis Ribas-Dominicci (USAF). Miramar now hosts the Puerto Rico Convention Center as well as some of San Juan Harbor's cruise ship piers. In 2005 Miramar was designated an historical district of Puerto Rico.

==== Río Piedras ====
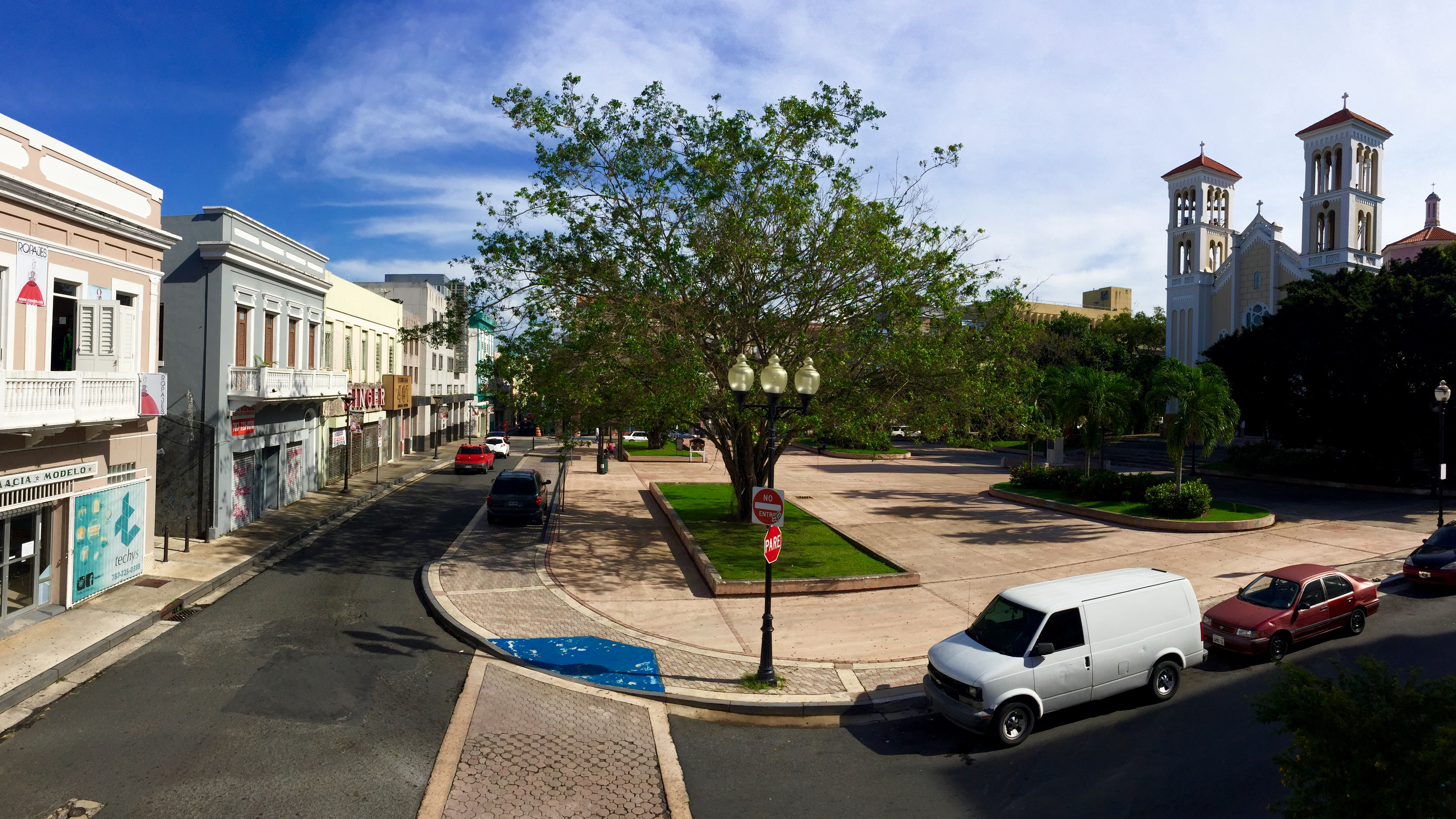
Plaza de la Convalecencia in Río Piedras Pueblo (the historic downtown of Rio Piedras).

South of Santurce is Hato Rey, part of the former municipality of Río Piedras. Hato Rey was grazing ground for cattle owned by the royal government (hence its name, the King's Herd in Spanish) as early as the 16th century, and is now considered the financial center of the island. A section of this district is often referred to as Milla de Oro (actually 0.47 miles or 0.76 kilometers long) due in part to the many banks and businesses located there.

In the southern part of the city is the socially diversified community of Río Piedras. Founded in the mid-1850s, Río Piedras was a separate town which hosted sugar cane plantations and the estates of some of San Juan's wealthiest inhabitants (as well as their working-class staff). The Spanish colonial governors also had their summer home there on land which eventually gave way to the main campus of the University of Puerto Rico. In 1951 the municipalities of San Juan and Río Piedras were merged to redefine San Juan's current city limits. Today Río Piedras comprises the largest area of the municipality of San Juan. and is home to the "Plaza del Mercado" (Río Piedras Marketplace), the main campus and the Medical Sciences campus of the University of Puerto Rico and the San Juan Botanical Garden.

== Demographics ==
Population of San Juan
Census	Pop.	Note	%±
1900	32,048		—
1910	48,716		52.0%
1920	69,733		43.1%
1930	114,715		64.5%
1940	169,247		47.5%
1950	224,767		32.8%
1960	451,658		100.9%
1970	463,242		2.6%
1980	434,849		−6.1%
1990	437,745		0.7%
2000	434,374		−0.8%
2010	395,475		−9.0%
2020	342,259		−13.5%
2025 (est.)	329,737	▼	−3.7%

Population of Río Piedras
Year	Pop.	±%
1899	13,760	—
1910	18,880	+37.2%
1920	24,745	+31.1%
1930	40,853	+65.1%
1940	68,290	+67.2%
1950	134,989	+97.7%
2000	332,344	+146.2%

The municipality of San Juan has a population of 342,259 as of the 2020 US Census, making it the largest in Puerto Rico, and the 57th largest in the United States and its territories. From 1899 to 1950 the municipality of San Juan excluded the township of Río Piedras. For this reason, population data and land area for the period make reference only to the Antiguo San Juan and Santurce barrios, or subdivisions, of San Juan. The old municipality of Río Piedras constituted the third most populated city of Puerto Rico at the time of its annexation in 1951. Its strategic location south of the capital served as a junction for all the principal ways of transportation of the island and as a geographical entry to San Juan, which are factors that prompted Río Piedras's dramatic urban development in the 20th century.

Race	Population	%
Two or more races	183,056	53.5
Black alone or African American	28,031	8.2
White alone	49,388	14.4
American Indian and Alaska Native	1,974	0.6
Asian alone	1,060	0.3
Native Hawaiian / Other Pacific Islander alone	61	0.0
Some Other Race alone	78,689	23.0

Among the Hispanic and Latino population, Puerto Ricans are the largest group; they make up 87.5% of San Juan's Hispanic population. People of Dominican descent make up 7.6% of the Hispanic population, while those of Cuban descent form 1.7% of the Hispanic populace. Other Hispanic and Latino groups collectively form 3.2% of San Juan's Hispanic population.

There are 4,822 whites and 1,187 blacks of non-Hispanic origin living in San Juan. Non-Hispanic whites and blacks form 1.2% and 0.3% of San Juan's population respectively. There are also approximately 673 Asians of non-Hispanic origin in San Juan; they make up less than 0.1% of the population. However, Asians of Hispanic and non-Hispanic origin together number at 6,342.

The vast majority of Asians in San Juan are of Chinese descent; of the 6,342 Asians, 4,928 are Chinese. Chinese comprise 1.4% of the population. The only other sizable Asian group in San Juan are Indian Americans; there are 698 people of Indian descent in the city, forming 0.2% of the population. There are very small numbers of people of Filipino, Japanese, and Vietnamese ancestry; none of these groups number more than 100 members.

According to the 2006–2008 American Community Survey, 87.5% of San Juan's population was native and 12.5% were foreign-born. Of the native population, 86.9% were born in Puerto Rico or the U.S. proper, of which 75.6% were born in Puerto Rico and 8.9% were born in the U.S. The other 0.7% were born in a different U.S. territory or born abroad to American parents. The remaining 11.9% of the population were born outside the United States and U.S. territories.

In recent years, an increasing number of Americans not of Hispanic ancestry (both of African American and of White American descent) have moved to San Juan. In addition, a large number of Stateside Puerto Ricans have settled in the city upon their return to Puerto Rico. There is also a growing West Indian population, both of Hispanic and non-Hispanic origin.

San Juan today is home to the largest Jewish community in Puerto Rico, and one of the largest Jewish communities in the Caribbean, with more than 2,000 people attending two local synagogues in Santurce (the Conservative Shaare Zedeck Synagogue and the Reform Temple Beth Shalom) and an additional synagogue (the Chabad Jewish Center of Puerto Rico) in Isla Verde in neighboring Carolina.

In terms of ancestry, 23,875 people claimed American ancestry, which is equivalent to 5.8% of San Juan's population. Other sizable ancestry groups included those of Italian descent, French descent, and West Indian descent. People of Italian descent numbered at 1,694, forming 0.4% of the population; people of French descent numbered at 1,064, forming 0.2% of the population. Finally, those of West Indian descent numbered at 1,393, forming 0.3% of San Juan's population. Approximately 1,026 people claimed Sub-Saharan African ancestry; 719 claimed Irish ancestry; 646 claimed German ancestry; 431 claimed Arab ancestry, and 346 claimed English ancestry. There are many other ancestry groups in San Juan, but they are very scant.

As of 2000, speakers of English as a first language accounted for 12.93% of the population.

== Economy ==
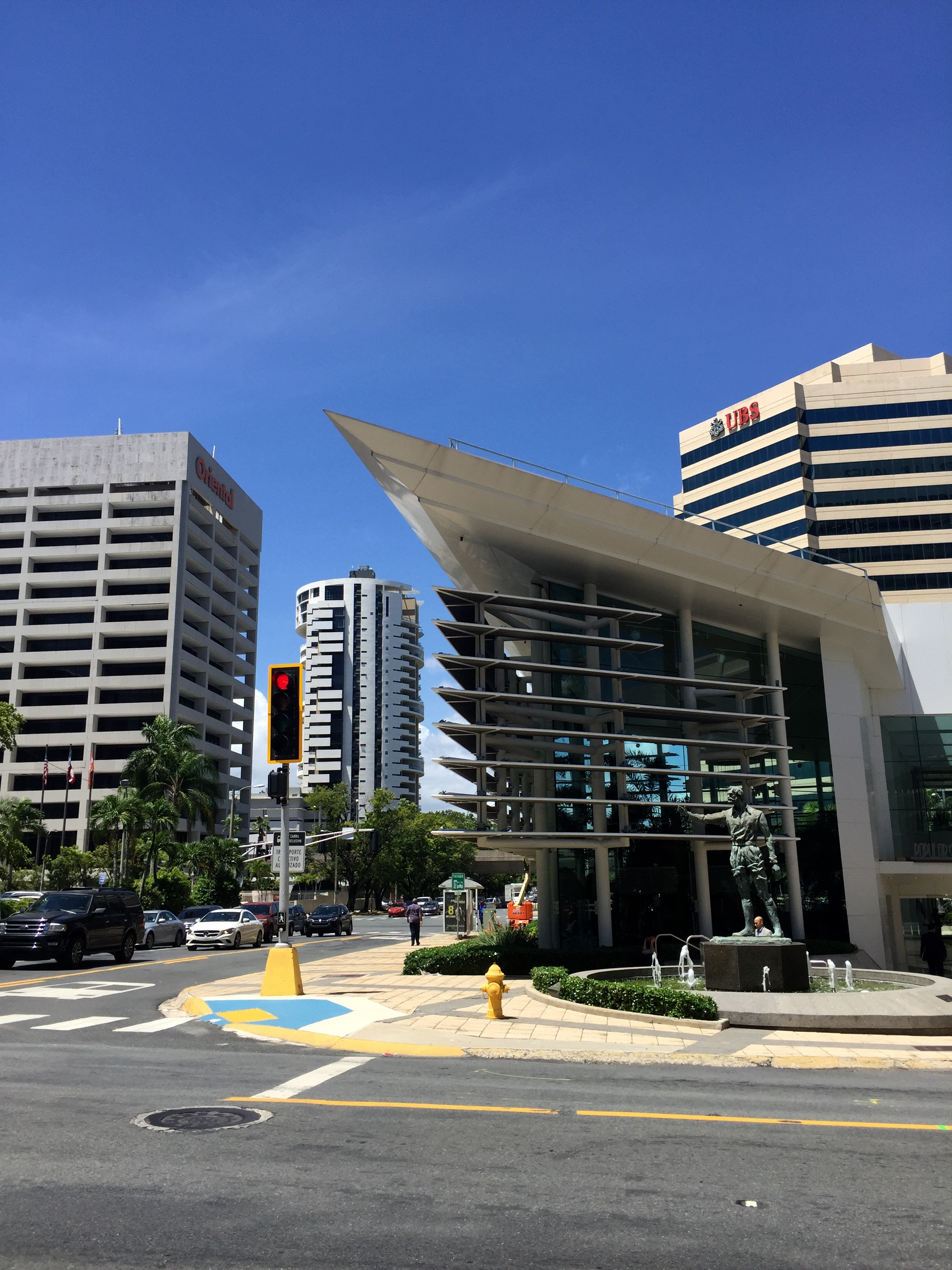
Popular, Inc. headquarters at Popular Center in Hato Rey.

San Juan experienced significant economic growth following World War II. During this period the city underwent an industrial revolution, although as of 1984 it had never generated its own economic region. The city's economy relies mostly on companies dedicated to the manufacture of several products, including: chemical substances (bleach and house cleaning products); pharmaceuticals; rum and other beverages; fertilizers; electric tools; electronic devices; plastics, textiles, and food-based products.

Tourism is also a key industry, based on San Juan's proximity to Puerto Rico's main airport, the Luis Muñoz Marín International Airport. The tourism focus of the city is located in the district of Condado Beach where there are luxurious hotels. Historical locations such as El Morro, Old San Juan and El Cuartel de Ballaja are promoted in tourism campaigns. The district of Hato Rey contains a corporate sector known as Milla de Oro (Golden Mile) which serves as the headquarters of local and international banks. San Juan's Hato Rey district is often referred to as the "Wall Street of the Caribbean", due to the influence of the area on Puerto Rico and the Caribbean's economy.

San Juan is also home to the Popular, Inc., parent company of Banco Popular de Puerto Rico, Popular Bank, E-Loan, and a Fortune 1000 company as of 2022. Other companies based in San Juan include ATH Network, First BanCorp, Liberty Puerto Rico, The Cervantes Group, and Triple-S Management Corporation. Seaborne Airlines is headquartered on the ninth floor of the World Plaza Building in Hato Rey.

=== Tourism ===
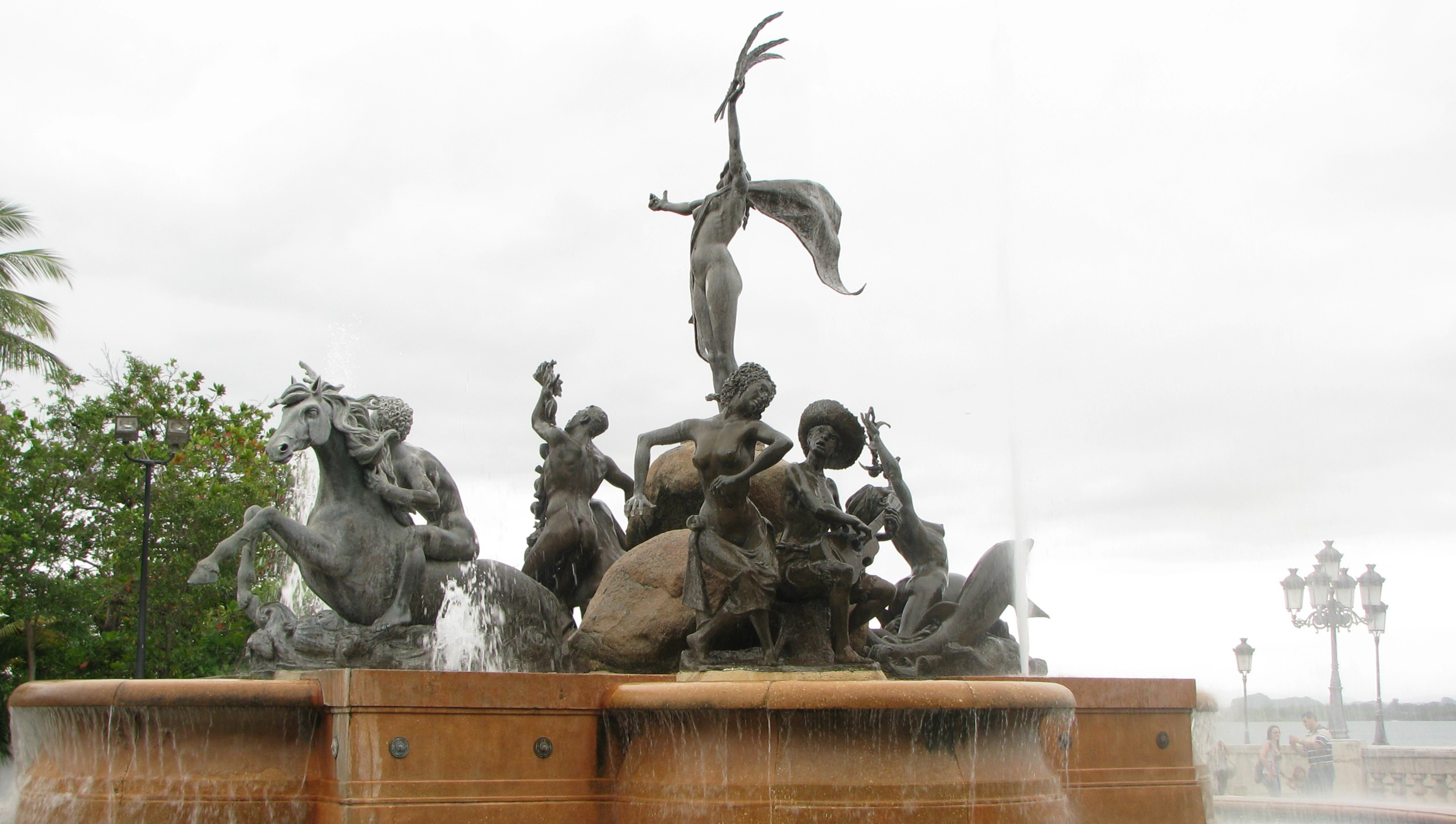
Fuente Raíces, Paseo de La Princesa

Technological advances after World War II in the development of the airliner, coupled with the island's climate and natural setting, have transformed San Juan into the springboard for tourism around the island, and has made the rest of the Caribbean known throughout the world during the last fifty years. Today the capital features hotels, museums, historical buildings, restaurants, parks, beaches and shopping centers. San Juan is the most visited city in Puerto Rico domestically and internationally, with approximately 12.2 million passengers arriving by air and 1.8 million cruise passengers arriving by sea in 2023 according to the Puerto Rico Tourism Company and the Puerto Rico Ports Authority.

Old San Juan is often emphasized in tourism campaigns, promoting the historic nature of its colonial buildings and narrow streets covered by cobblestones, a blue stone cast from furnace slag; they were brought over as ballast on Spanish ships. This includes the city's ancient defensive wall and forts, most notably El Morro and the Castillo San Cristóbal. On January 23, 1984, both of these edifices together with La Fortaleza and El Cañuelo (in nearby Toa Baja) were included as a UNESCO World Heritage Site, catalogued as being part of humanity's cultural patrimony as part of the National Park Service-administered San Juan National Historic Site. The restaurants and art galleries in the zone are visited by tourists and locals alike.

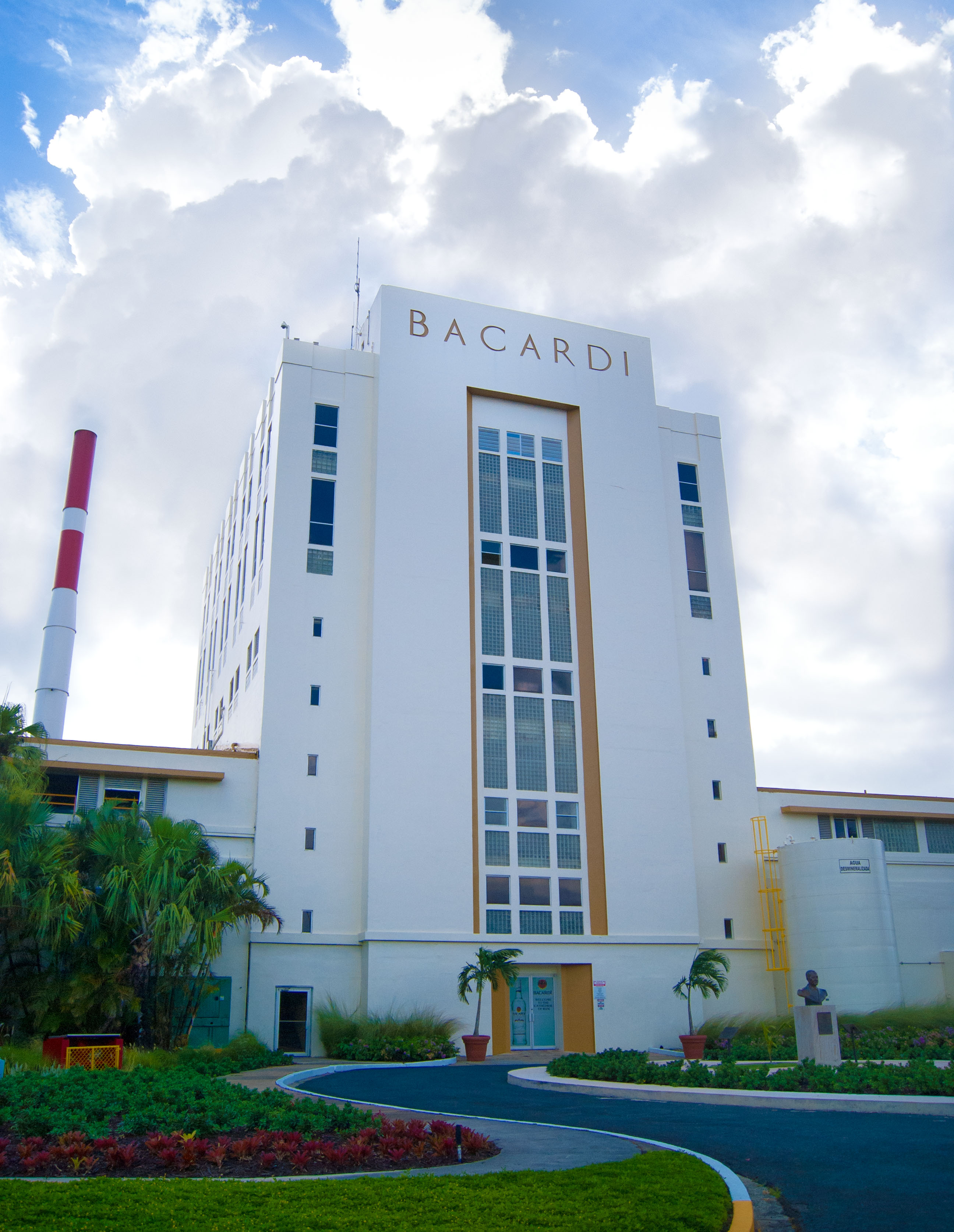
Casa Bacardi in nearby Cataño is a popular tourist attraction for those visiting San Juan.

Outside of Old San Juan, the Puerto Rico Convention Center District (PRCC) includes the Puerto Rico Convention Center, which hosts a number of local and international events throughout the year such as the Puerto Rico Comic Con, the biggest of its kind in the Caribbean. The PRCC District also hosts a number of hotels, nightclubs, shops, cinemas, bars and restaurants, the Coca-Cola Music Hall, and the Toro Verde Eco Adventure Park.

Other notable tourist attractions in San Juan include the Condado and Ocean Park Beaches, El Escambrón and the Fortín de San Gerónimo, La Placita de Santurce, the Luis A. Ferré Performing Arts Center, the Luis Muñoz Marín and Luis Muñoz Rivera Parks, Plaza Las Américas, The Outlets at Montehiedra, Señorial Plaza, and The Mall of San Juan, the Museum of Art of Puerto Rico, the Puerto Rico Museum of Contemporary Art, the San Juan Wildlife Museum, and the University of Puerto Rico Botanical Garden, among others. The University of Puerto Rico's main campus in Río Piedras is also of interest with its historic quadrangle and clock tower, its number of theaters and venues which host events such as the Casals Festivals, and a museum. San Juan is also used by tourists as a base to explore other attractions within and outside the San Juan metropolitan area, such as the Bacardi Cathedral of Rum and boardwalk in Cataño, the "Pork Highway" of Guavate in Cayey, the bioluminiscent bay in Fajardo, the beaches and street food of Piñones in Loíza, and El Yunque National Forest recreational areas in the municipalities of Luquillo and Río Grande.

==== Post Hurricane Maria ====
An April 2019 report indicated that, by that time, repairs after Hurricane Maria were moving rapidly. Only a few hotels were still closed in San Juan and that life for tourists in and around the capital had, for the most part, returned to normal. By October 2019, nearly all of the popular amenities for tourists, in the major destinations such as San Juan, Ponce and Arecibo, were in operation on the island and tourism was rebounding. This was important for the economy, since tourism provides up 10% of Puerto Rico's GDP, according to Discover Puerto Rico.

In late November 2019, reports indicated that 90 calls to San Juan by Royal Caribbean ships would be cancelled during 2020 and 2021. This step would mean 360,000 fewer visitors, with a loss to the island's economy of $44 million. As well, 30 ship departures from San Juan were being canceled.

== Arts and culture ==
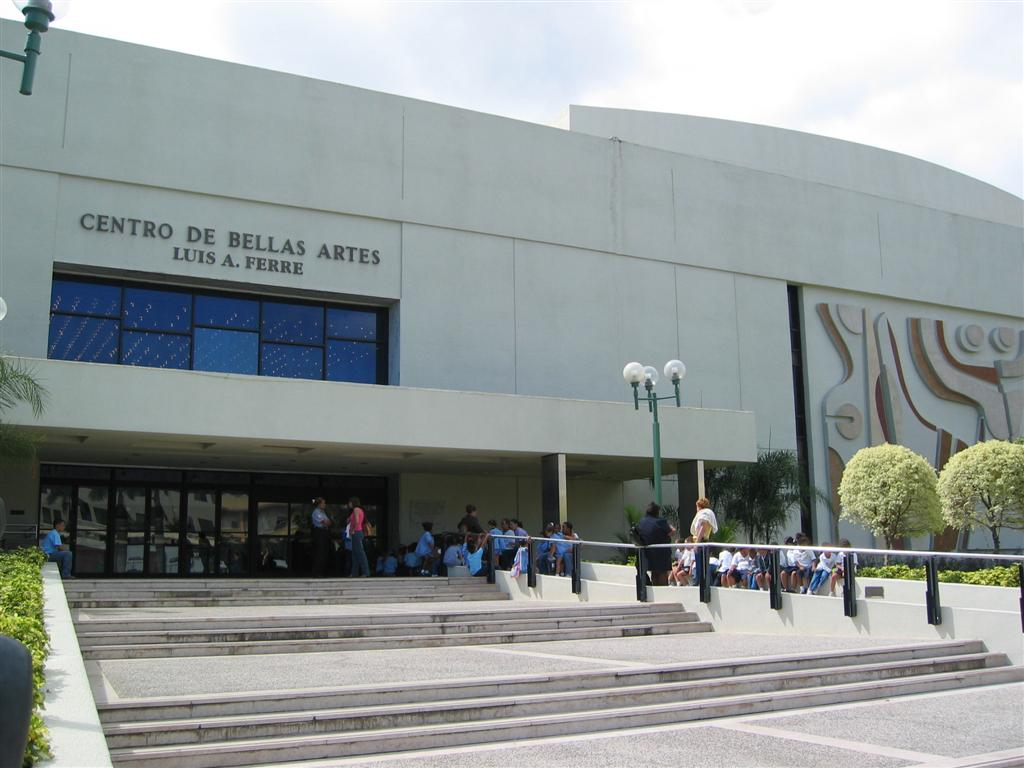
The Luis A. Ferré Performing Arts Center in Santurce

As the capital and most populous municipality of Puerto Rico, San Juan is a culturally vibrant city influenced by the heterogenous origins of Puerto Rican culture. The city is the birthplace of artists and musicians who have significantly influenced the arts, design, literature, music and pop culture of Puerto Rico. During the 20th century, the musical aspect of the city was influenced by performers including Afro-Caribbean dancer and choreographer Sylvia del Villard and José Enrique Pedreira who became a composer of Puerto Rican Danzas.

International musicians such as opera singer Justino Díaz and Grammy Award winners Ramón Ayala (Daddy Yankee) and Ricky Martin were born in the city. Other notable residents include writers Giannina Braschi and Tomas Blanco, award-winning actors Raul Julia and Benicio del Toro, and comedian José Miguel Agrelot. Teacher Rafael Cordero (1790–1868), was influential in the development of Puerto Rican education and began the process of beatification in 2013, if accepted as a saint he will become only the second black saint from the Americas.

=== Entertainment and performing arts ===
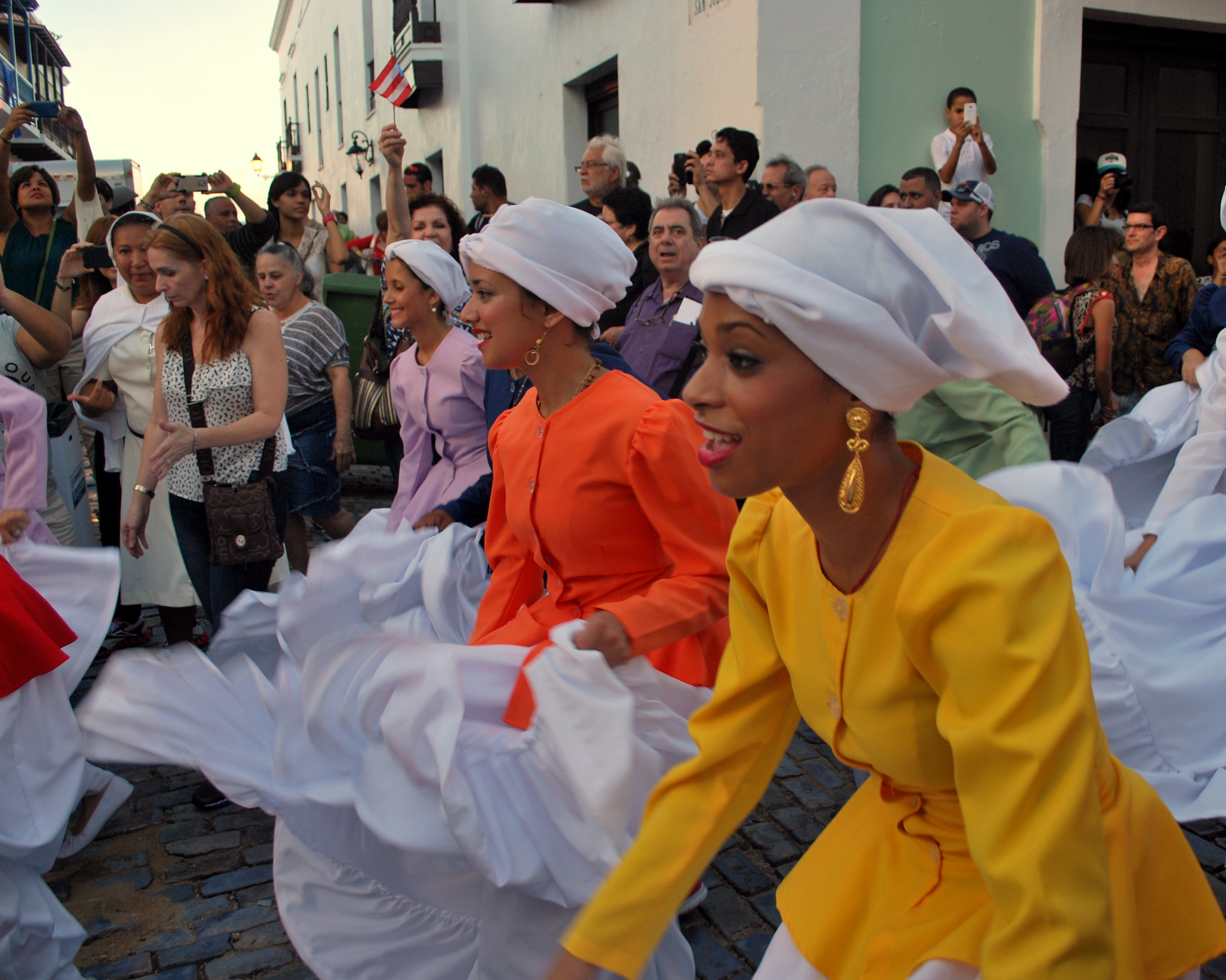
The San Sebastián Street Festival

San Juan is host to numerous annual festivals and celebrations. The official patronal festival of the city is the summertime Feast of Saint John (Fiestas de San Juan). The most famous event is the San Sebastián Street Festival (Fiestas de la Calle de San Sebastián), celebrated yearly during the third weekend of January in Old San Juan. The event, originally a community festival coinciding with the feast day of Saint Sebastian, has become an important part of Puerto Rican popular culture, being unofficially considered to mark the end of the Christmas and holiday season in the island. It is now one of the most popular and largest festivals in Puerto Rico and the Caribbean, drawing around 200,000 visitors each year. Other annual festivals and events in San Juan include the Puerto Rico Heineken JazzFest in March, the Casals Festivals in April, Puerto Rico Comic Con in May, San Juan Fashion Week in September, Puerto Rican Music Festival (Festival de la Música Puertorriqueña) in November, the city-wide events and activities of Christmas in San Juan (Navidad en San Juan) in December, and the New Year's Eve celebrations in Distrito T-Mobile.

The Luis A. Ferré Performing Arts Center (Spanish: Centro de Bellas Artes Luis A. Ferré) hosts some of the most important musical and artistic events in Puerto Rico. It is home to the Puerto Rico Symphony Orchestra (PRSO) and hosts the Casals Festival, the most important classical music festival in the Caribbean. The venue also hosts theater and musical performances such as Hamilton, which it hosted in 2019. The Conservatory of Music of Puerto Rico is a public music conservatory that hosts Puerto Rican and international students has a longstanding relationship with the classical music movement in the island. The Ateneo Puertorriqueño and the theater of the University of Puerto Rico, Rio Piedras also host important music events.

=== Museums and visual arts ===
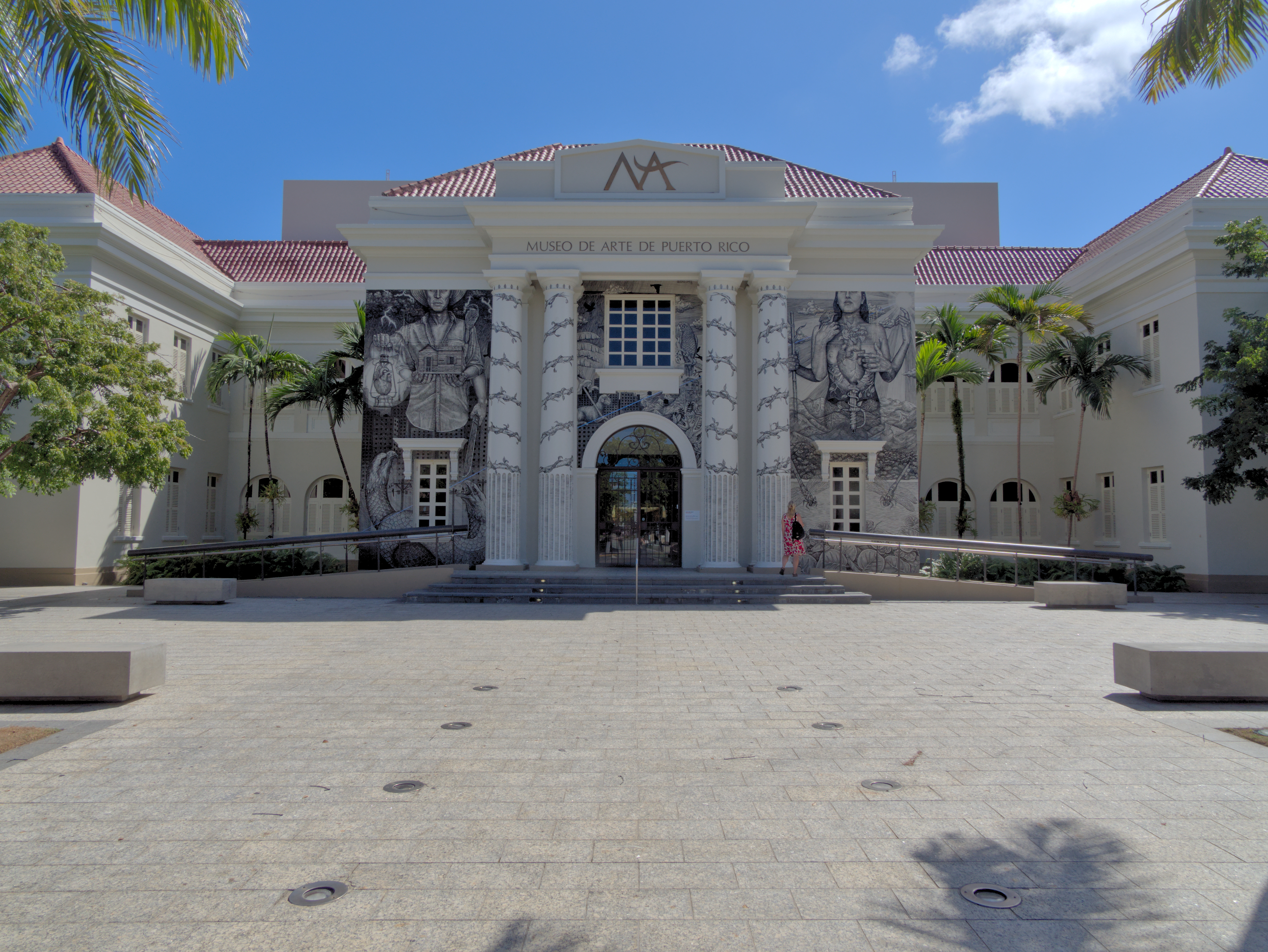
The Puerto Rico Museum of Art

The city is also the home of contemporary and classic art museums. The Puerto Rico Museum of Art hosts the largest collection of art in Puerto Rico, housing over 1,100 permanent art pieces and displaying temporary exhibitions containing artwork from various locations through Latin America. The Puerto Rico Museum of Contemporary Art, located in Santurce, specializes in contemporary artwork from Latin America and the Caribbean. The paintings displayed in the permanent exhibition are either acquired by the museum's administrative personnel or donated by artists and collectors. They are judged by a panel of painters, art critics, and scholars before being displayed.

Other museums such as the Pablo Casals Museum, the San Juan Book Museum, the Museum of the Americas, and the National Gallery display historic items and artwork alongside contemporary art. Miscellaneous museums such as the Children's Museum, the San Juan Wildlife Museum, and the Bacardi Distillery (also known as the "Rum Cathedral") in nearby Cataño appeal to different audiences through interactive exhibitions.

The Casa Dra. Concha Melendez Ramirez in Santurce is a National Historic Landmark and museum and research center that showcases the life and work of one of the most important figures in the literary culture of Puerto Rico. Old San Juan is also home to important art museums, such as the Puerto Rico National Gallery, and numerous private art galleries.

== Government ==
=== Structure ===
San Juan's coat of arms

As one of Puerto Rico's 78 municipalities, San Juan's government has two branches, the executive and the legislative. Those citizens eligible to vote directly elect the Mayor of San Juan and the municipal assembly for four-year terms. The municipal government is housed in City Hall or Casa Alcaldia, which is located at 153 San Francisco Street, facing the Plaza de Armas at the center of Old San Juan. City Hall was constructed based on Madrid's City Hall starting in 1604 and completed in 1789.

The executive branch is headed by a popularly elected mayor. The office is held by Miguel Romero Lugo who won in the 2020 general election, and was reelected in the 2024 general election. Miguel Romero Lugo took over from Carmen Yulín Cruz, who was elected at the 2012 general election. Before her, Jorge A. Santini held the position for 12 years.

In addition to running the city's day-to-day operations and supervising associated departments, the mayor is responsible for appointing a secretary-auditor and a treasurer. San Juan's Municipal Legislature is made up of 17 municipal legislators, elected at-large, which represent the city's population.

==== Coat of arms and flag ====
San Juan's historic coat of arms during Spanish rule

The municipio has an official flag and coat of arms.

On March 8, 1948, the city government of San Juan officially adopted as the city's first flag an orange field, in the center of which is the coat of arms of the city. The orange color was based and taken from Father Diego de Torres Vargas' text and it reads:

"Escudo de armas dado a Puerto Rico por los Reyes Católicos en el año de 1511, siendo Procurador un vecino llamado Pedro Moreno. Son: un cordero blanco con su banderilla colorada, sobre un libro, y todo sobre una isla verde, que es la de Puerto Rico, y por los lados una F y una I, que quiere decir Fernando e Isabel, los Reyes Católicos que se las dieron, y hoy se conservan en el estandarte real, que es de damasco anaranjado, con que se ganó la ciudad".

("Coat of arms given to Puerto Rico by the Catholic Monarchs in the year 1511 being Procurator a vecino (citizen) named Pedro Moreno. They are a white lamb with a red flag, on top of a book, and everything above a green island, which is Puerto Rico...which is of orange damask, with which the city was won"). It appears that the color was changed from orange to white at some point.

=== Territorial and federal government ===
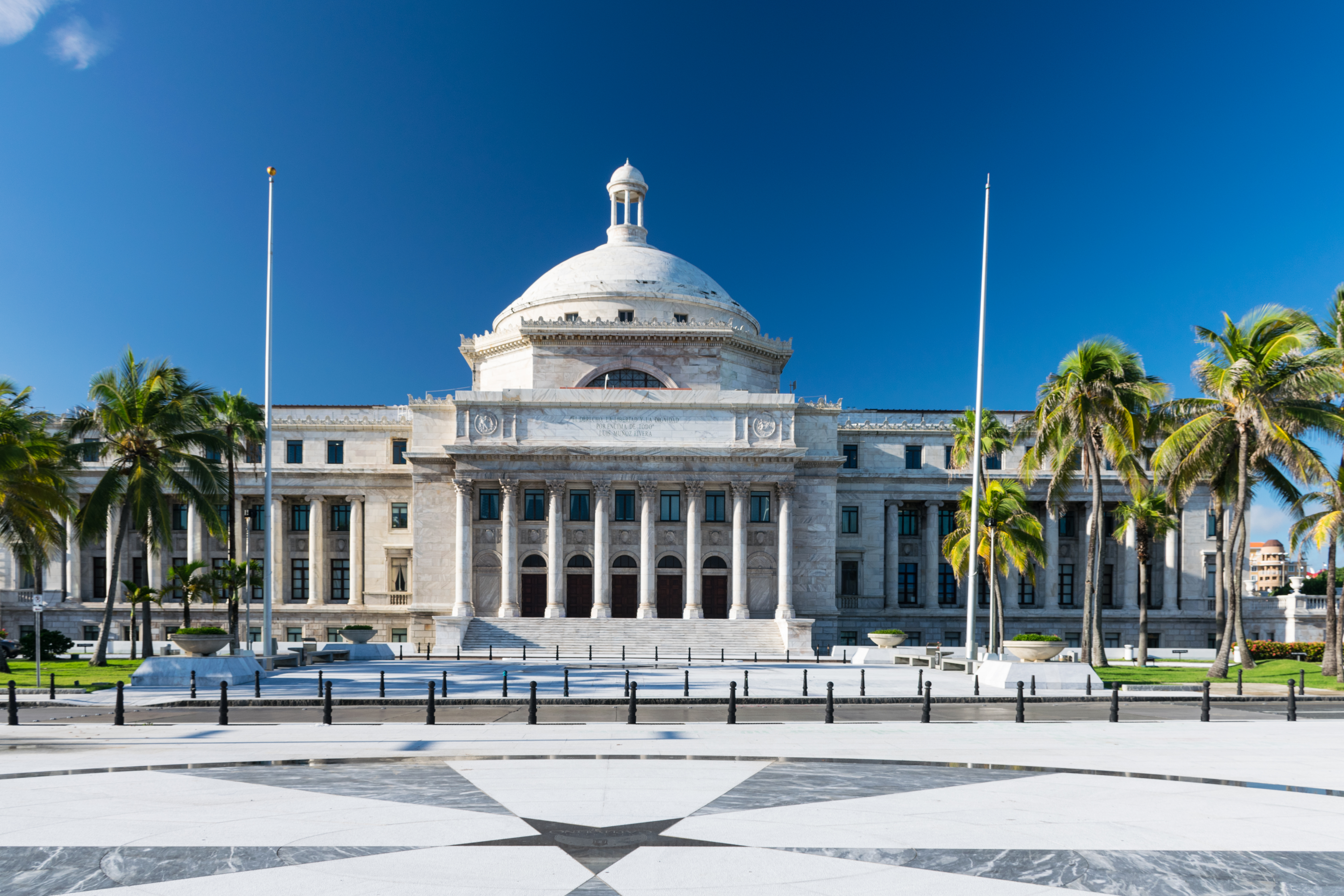
The Capitol of Puerto Rico, built between 1921 and 1929.

San Juan is the territorial capital of the Commonwealth of Puerto Rico, and it is home to the executive, legislative and judicial branches of the Puerto Rican government. San Juan is the seat of the Puerto Rico Senatorial district I, which is represented by two Senators.

The United States District Court for the District of Puerto Rico is located in Hato Rey. There are two additional federal offices in the San Juan metropolitan area: the Jose V. Toledo U.S. Post Office and Courthouse in Old San Juan and the GSA Federal Center in Guaynabo. The Federal Bureau of Investigation (FBI), along with other federal organisms, has also had regional offices at the Federico Degetau Federal Building, also in Hato Rey.

=== Safety ===
Law enforcement in San Juan is the joint responsibility of the Department of Police and Public Safety, also known as the San Juan Police Department and the Puerto Rico Police Department. The Municipal Police, originally known as the "San Juan Municipal Guard", was created in 1521 and had active military and law enforcement functions until 1980, when Act #77 created municipal law enforcement agencies in Puerto Rico. It employs over 1,000 sworn officers plus civilian staff.

==== Crime ====
In 2010, there were 201 homicides in San Juan, a rate of around 50 per 100,000 residents. In 2019, there were 172 homicides, a rate of 53 per 100,000 residents. In the 2019 bulletin ranking of the 50 most violent cities in the world, San Juan ranked as the 16th most violent in the world, with a rate of 54.01 murders per 100,000 inhabitants. San Juan ranked as the 3rd most violent in the United States and its territories, after St. Louis and Baltimore.

== Media ==
=== Newspapers ===
Most of Puerto Rico's major newspapers are published in San Juan: El Nuevo Día, Primera Hora, El Vocero and the English-language San Juan Star. Other newspapers published in San Juan are Metro Puerto Rico, Indice and Caribbean Business News.

=== Radio ===
San Juan is also home to several of Puerto Rico's major radio stations: WKAQ 580 AM and 105 FM, WPRM Salsoul 99.1 FM, WODA La Nueva 94 FM, Fidelity 95.7 FM, WSKN Radio Isla 1320 AM, WORO Radio Oro 92.5 FM, Salsa Hits Radio, WAPA Radio, WOYE Magic 97.3, WRTU Radio Universidad FM, WIPR 940 AM, Mix 107.7 FM, WTOK Hot 102, AZ Rock, Radio Antillas, etc.

=== Television ===
Some of the television stations based in San Juan are WKAQ-TV Telemundo/NBC Puerto Rico, WORA Univision Puerto Rico, WAPA-TV, WIPR-TV, WTCV Mega TV, WJPX América TeVé, etc.

=== Movies and filming ===
San Juan has been the setting of numerous movies and the city has also been used as a stand-in or substitute for other cities and countries where filming is more expensive, more dangerous or more restrictive. Some of the most popular movies filmed in San Juan are: Woody Allen's Bananas (1971), Captain Ron (1992), Assassins (1995), Amistad (1997), Bad Boys II (2003) standing-in as Havana, Dirty Dancing: Havana Nights (2004) also as Havana, The Men Who Stare at Goats (2009) standing-in as Iraq, The Losers (2010), Fast Five (2011) standing-in as Miami and Rio de Janeiro, Pirates of the Caribbean: On Stranger Tides (2011) standing-in as Cádiz, Spain, The Rum Diary (2011), 22 Jump Street (2014) standing-in as a Mexican resort, Captain America: Civil War (2016) standing-in as Lagos, Nigeria, Force of Nature (2020), Black Panther: Wakanda Forever (2022), and Blue Beetle (2023).

== Education ==
=== Colleges and universities ===
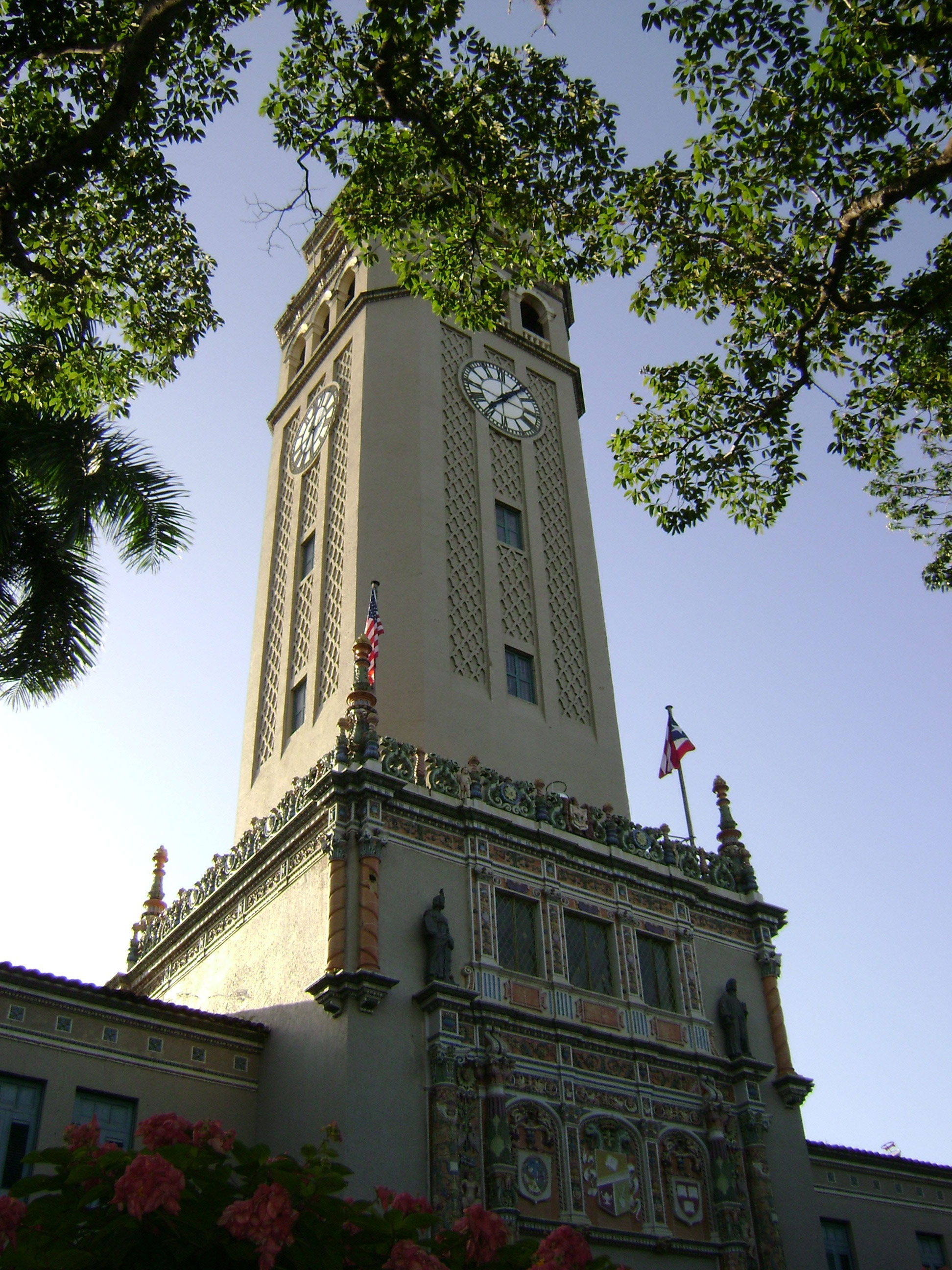
The main tower of the University of Puerto Rico campus in Río Piedras

San Juan is home to many of Puerto Rico's institutions of higher learning. The University of Puerto Rico Río Piedras Campus is located in San Juan, along with the University of Puerto Rico's Medical Sciences Campus. Other colleges located in San Juan are the University of the Sacred Heart, the Polytechnic University of Puerto Rico, the Ana G. Méndez University System's Metropolitan University, the Metropolitan Campus of the Inter American University of Puerto Rico, the Carlos Albizu University, the Evangelic Seminary of Puerto Rico and the Center for Advanced Studies on Puerto Rico and the Caribbean. There are smaller colleges located in the city, including the ICPR Junior College, the Instituto de Banca y Comercio and the International Junior College, located in Santurce.

There are also several technical schools based in San Juan, including the Technological College of San Juan, the Liceo de Artes y Ciencias, Ramirez College of Business and Technology, and the Puerto Rico Technical Junior College. The Puerto Rico Conservatory of Music and the School of Fine Arts in Old San Juan specialize in education that promotes the fine arts and music.

=== Public and private schools ===
As of the 2022–23 school year, there are 83 public schools serving 24,494 students in San Juan, all of which are operated by the Puerto Rico Department of Education. Most of the specialized schools operated by the Commonwealth of Puerto Rico are located in San Juan. These schools emphasize topics such as Science and Math, Radio and Television, Arts, Trade, Music, and Sports, but also include other subjects such as Spanish, English, and Social Studies in their curriculum.

In addition to dozens of state-run elementary, intermediate, and high schools, the government of the city of San Juan operates two bilingual schools, including one sports-magnet school, the first municipal-run schools in Puerto Rico. Several private schools are located in San Juan, including Robinson and St. John's schools in the Condado, Perpetuo Socorro in Miramar, St. John's Episcopal, Santa Mónica and Academia San Jorge in Santurce, Commonwealth High School, La Merced and Espíritu Santo in Hato Rey, Escuela Josefita Monserrate de Selles, San Antonio, Colegio San Ignacio de Loyola, San José in Río Piedras and Cupeyville, St. Mary's, Boneville and Cupey Maria Montesory School in Cupey.

== Transportation ==
=== Airports ===
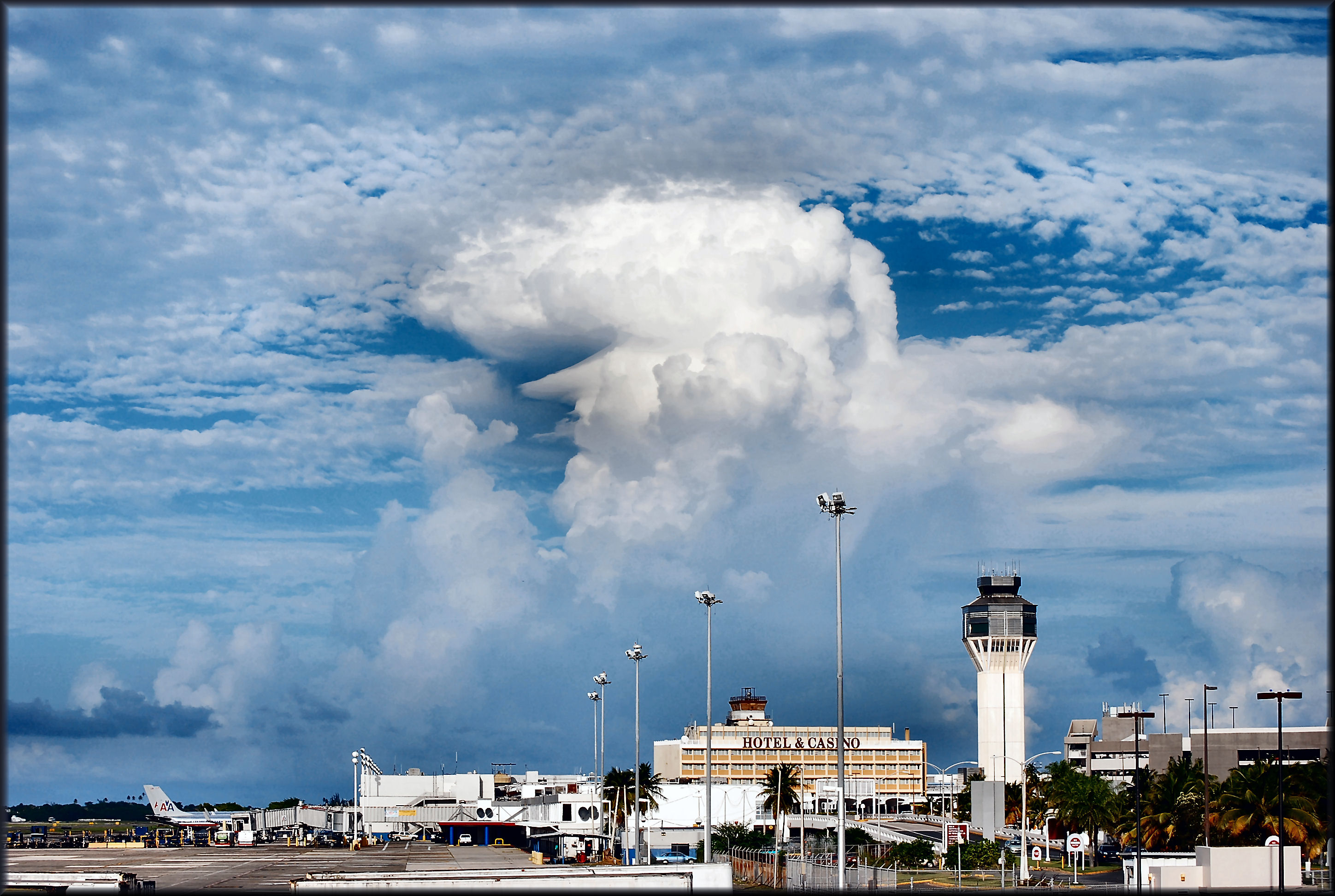
Luis Muñoz Marin International Airport

The San Juan Metropolitan Area is served by two airports:

The Luis Muñoz Marín International Airport (SJU), San Juan's primary commercial airport, is located eight miles (12.9 km) from Old San Juan in the neighboring municipality of Carolina. The airport accommodates more than 30 domestic and international airlines and is the busiest airport in the Caribbean. It is often referred to as The Gateway to the Caribbean because it serves as the main connection to the island and the rest of the Caribbean for the United States and vice versa.

The area's secondary airport is the Fernando Ribas Dominicci Airport (SIG), located directly across the San Antonio Channel (Caño San Antonio) from Old San Juan in the Isla Grande district. Dominicci Airport is used mainly by general aviation aircraft, charter flights and some domestic commercial flights. It used to be the city's and also the island of Puerto Rico's main international gateway until the opening of Luis Muñoz Marin International Airport. It is now also widely used by the Isla Grande Flight School and Caribbean Flight Center, the only flight school on the island.

=== Highways and roads ===
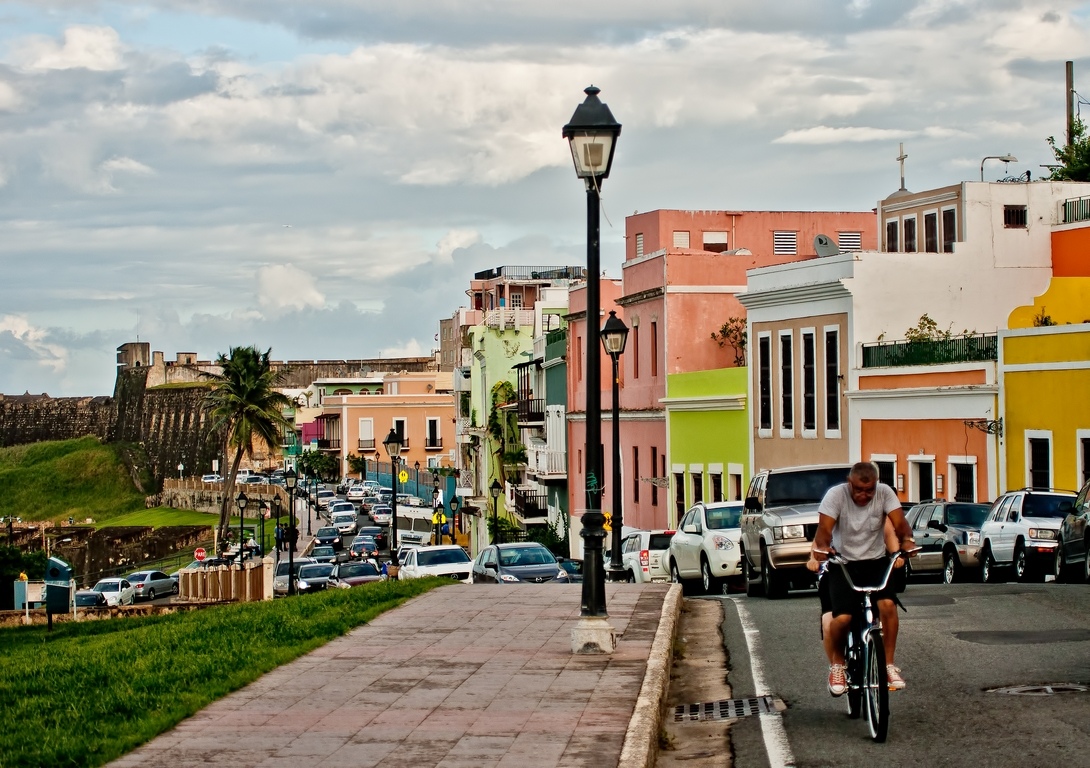
Calle Norzagaray in Old San Juan

Some of the major highways and roads of San Juan include:

- Puerto Rico Highway 52 (PR-52), also known as Luis A. Ferré Highway, runs from Santurce to Ponce through Caguas.
- Puerto Rico Highway 1 (PR-1), also known as Carretera Central, Antigua Carretera Militar and La Muda between Río Piedras and Caguas, runs from Santurce to Ponce through Cayey and the Cordillera Central.
- Puerto Rico Highway 2 (PR-2), also known as Kennedy Expressway between San Juan and Guaynabo, runs from Santurce to Ponce through Mayagüez.
- Puerto Rico Highway 3 (PR-3), also known as 65 de Infantería Avenue between Río Piedras and Carolina, runs from Hato Rey to Salinas through Humacao.
- Puerto Rico Highway 22 (PR-22), also known as José de Diego Expressway, runs from Santurce to Hatillo.
- Puerto Rico Highway 8 (PR-8) runs from Sabana Llana Norte to barrio Oriente and the Luis Muñoz Marín International Airport.
- Puerto Rico Highway 16 (PR-16) runs parallel to PR-1 from the Port of San Juan in Hato Rey to the Fernando Luis Ribas Dominicci Airport in Isla Grande.
- Puerto Rico Highway 18 (PR-18), also known as Las Américas Expressway, runs from Hato Rey Norte to Monacillo Urbano.
- Puerto Rico Highway 20 (PR-20), also known as Rafael Martínez Nadal Expressway, runs from Guaynabo Pueblo through Monacillo Urbano and Gobernador Piñero to Caparra.
- Puerto Rico Highway 26 (PR-26), also known as Román Baldorioty de Castro Expressway, runs from Santurce to the Luis Muñoz Marín International Airport and Carolina.
- Puerto Rico Highway 28 (PR-28), also known as Francisco José de Goya Avenue, runs from the Port of San Juan to Bayamón.

There are 193 bridges in San Juan.

=== Public transport ===
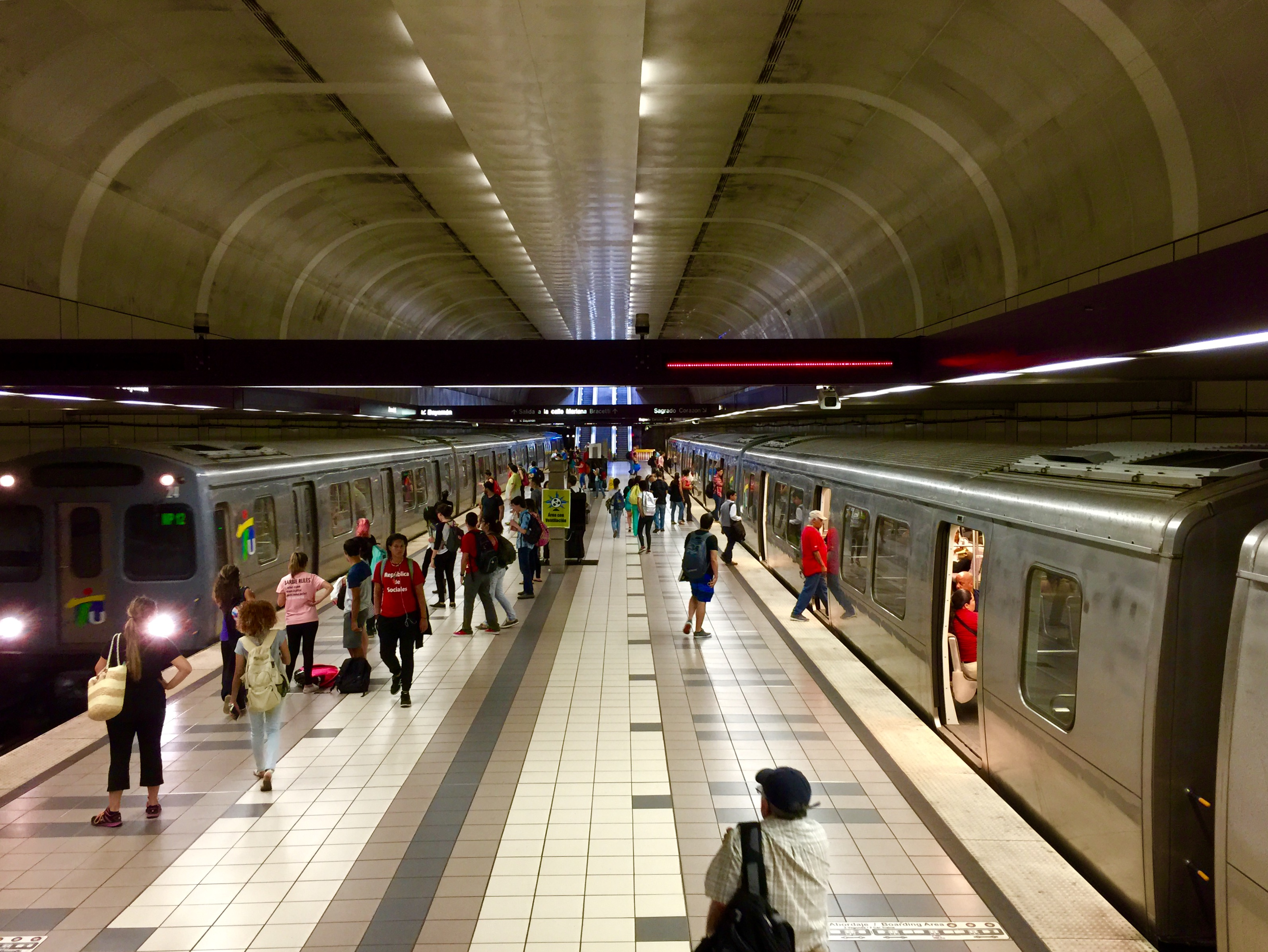
Universidad station

At 4,300 vehicles per paved mile, San Juan has by far the highest density of vehicles on the road of any city in the world. The city is served by five limited-access expressways and highways and numerous arterial avenues and boulevards but continues to suffer from severe traffic congestion.

The Metropolitan Bus Authority (Autoridad Metropolitana de Autobuses or AMA in Spanish) provides daily bus transportation to residents of San Juan, Guaynabo, Bayamón, Toa Baja, Trujillo Alto, Cataño and Carolina through 30 fixed routes. Its fleet consists of 277 regular buses and 35 handicap-accessible buses. AMA's ridership is estimated at 112,000 on weekdays.

The T5, 21 and 53 buses pass between Old San Juan, Condado and Isla Verde.

In an attempt to decrease vehicle dependency and road congestion, the city built a metro system dubbed "Tren Urbano" ("Urban Train"). The 10.7-mile (17.2 km) line connects to 16 stations. The project, which opened in late 2004, cost $2.25 billion and was more than $1 billion over budget and four years late. The Tren Urbano has received less ridership than was originally projected and has not significantly reduced the city's automobile traffic, despite a reported 7.5% ridership increase in 2006 over 2005. There is a planned project to build an "interurban light rail system" connecting the cities of San Juan and Caguas.

Increased investment in public transportation, however, has not changed the fact that San Juan is an automobile-reliant city and its fast growth has sparked urban sprawl. As of mid-2010, the government has approved plans for a redesign of this Puerto Rican city, featuring a new mass transit system, new roads and intersections, and more beach-access points. No cars will be allowed inside the oldest part of city (Old San Juan). The plans hope to remedy previous poor urban planning in the oldest section of the city, the Isleta, while curbing reliance on motor vehicles. The plans for redevelopment also hope to make the city more appealing in order to attract new residents, as San Juan has suffered from a shrinking population over the past 60 years.

=== Port ===
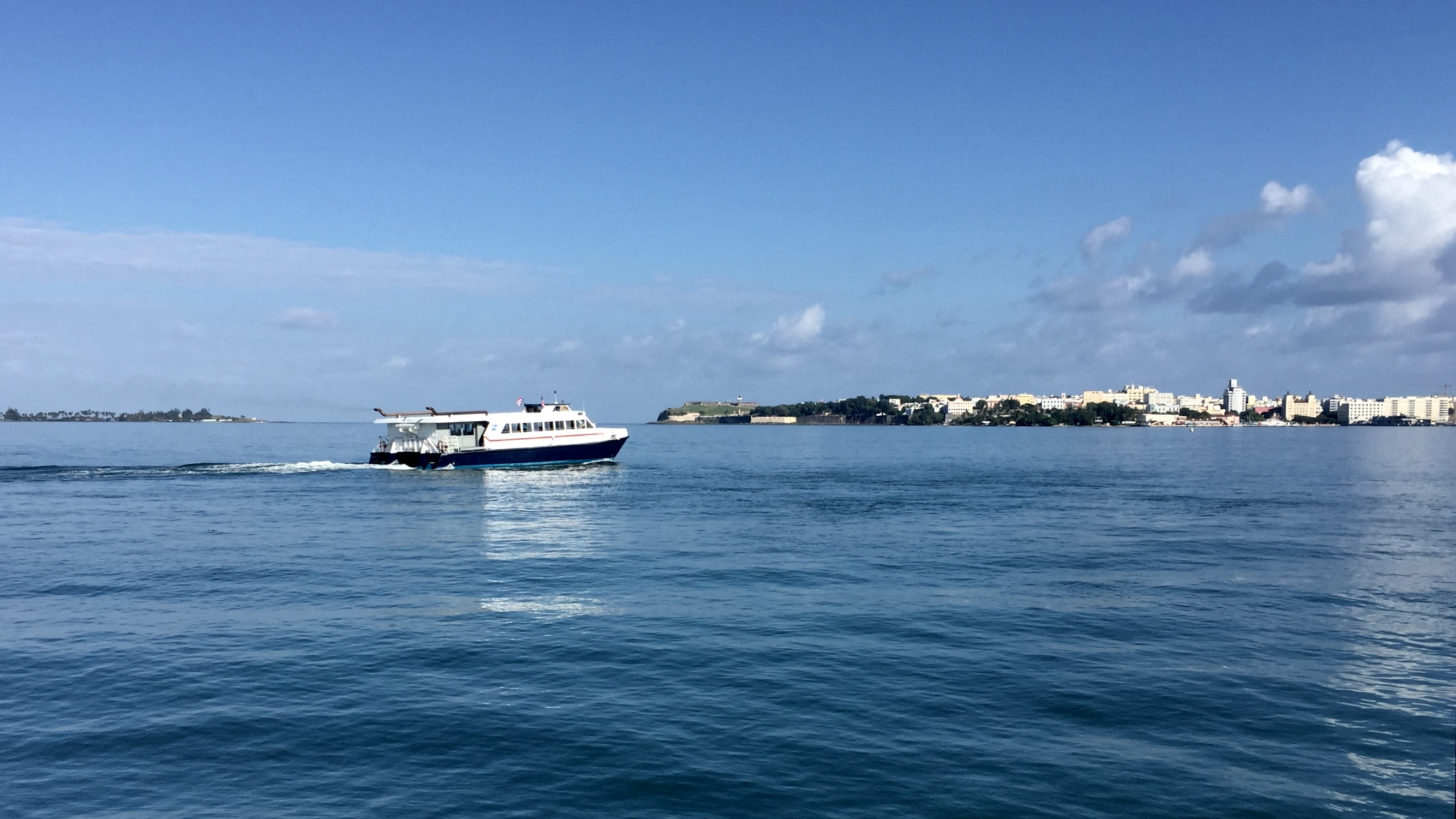
Cataño Ferry

The Port of San Juan is the fourth busiest seaport in the Western Hemisphere, ranked among the top 17 in the world in terms of container movement. It is also the largest home-based cruise port in the world with over a dozen cruise ships. It is the second busiest port in cruise volume after Miami. It is managed by the Puerto Rico Ports Authority.

AcuaExpreso is a ferry service in the San Juan Bay, consisting of the Cataño Ferry (Lancha de Cataño) service between downtown Cataño and Old San Juan, and the AquaExpress which connects Old San Juan to Hato Rey and the Tren Urbano.

== Healthcare ==
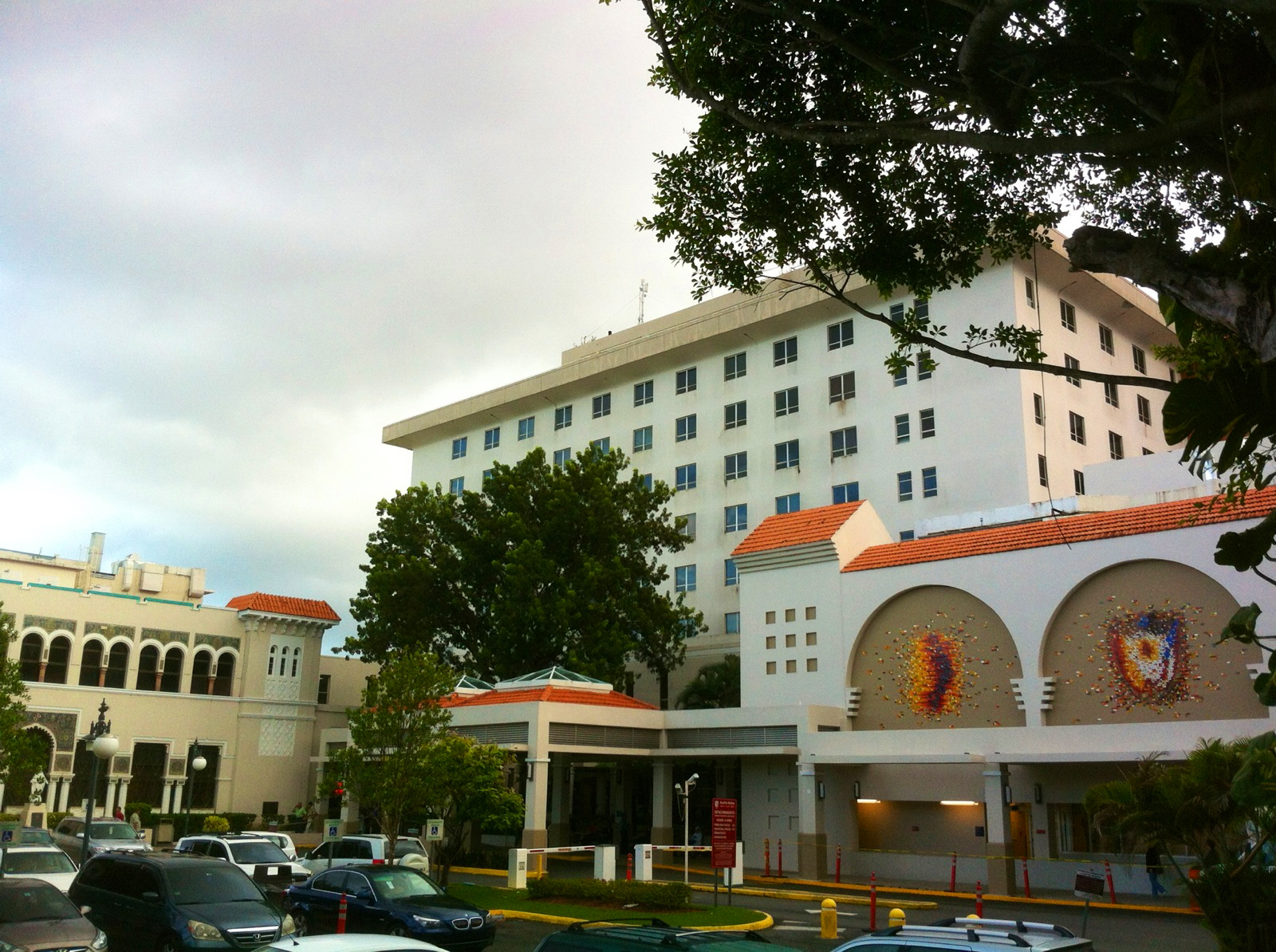
Auxilio Mutuo Hospital in barrio Universidad

San Juan has an elaborate system of triage, hospital, and preventive care health services. The municipal government sponsors regular health fairs in different areas of the city focusing on health care for the elderly and the disabled. There are 20 hospitals in San Juan, half of them operated by the government. The largest hospital in San Juan and most important of Puerto Rico and the Caribbean is the Rio Piedras Medical Center, or Centro Medico de Rio Piedras in Spanish. This hospital, founded in 1956, is operated by the Medical Services Administration of the Department of Health of Puerto Rico. It is made up of eight other hospitals.

- San Juan Municipal Hospital: This hospital is operated by the San Juan municipal government.
- Industrial Hospital: This is the hospital for Puerto Rico government employees, whether municipal or Commonwealth government employees. Normally, injured police officers and firefighters are cared for here.
- San Juan Pediatric Hospital - Also operated by the San Juan municipal government.
- Pediatric Hospital: Operated by the government of the Commonwealth, this is the main trauma hospital for pediatric cases.
- Centro Médico: This is the main hospital for trauma cases for Puerto Rico and the Caribbean.
- Centro Cardiovascular del Caribe (Caribbean Cardiovascular Center): This is the main hospital for open heart surgery in the Caribbean. It features a hotel for the patients' families.
- Psychiatric Hospital: The main psychiatric hospital in Puerto Rico. Operated by the government of Puerto Rico.
- Psychiatric Correctional Hospital: It is both a hospital and correctional facility. It is operated jointly by the Puerto Rico Department of Corrections and the Medical Services Administration.

The city of San Juan operates 10 hospitals. Of these, nine are Diagnostic and Treatment Centers located in communities throughout San Juan. The main hospital is located at Centro Medico. These 10 hospitals are:

- La Perla
- Puerta de Tierra
- Llorens Torres
- Puerto Nuevo
- San José
- Rio Piedras
- Sabana Llana
- Hoare
- Santurce Parada 19
- General Hospital (Centro Medico)

Also, there are 10 private hospitals in San Juan. These are:

- Hospital Metropolitano
- Hospital Auxilio Mutuo
- Hospital Auxilio Mutuo Expreso
- Hospital de Veteranos: The main Veterans hospital in the Caribbean. Operated by the U.S. Veteran Healthcare System.
- Ashford Presbyterian Hospital
- Hospital Pavia Hato Rey
- Hospital Pavia Santurce
- San Jorge Children's Hospital: The most well-known children's hospital in the San Juan Metropolitan Area.
- Hospital San Gerardo: Located at the Cupey neighborhood, is a small hospital but is also specialized in psychiatry and elderly.
- Hospital del Maestro (Teachers Hospital): Located in Hato Rey, this hospital is operated by the Puerto Rico Teachers Association.

== Sports ==
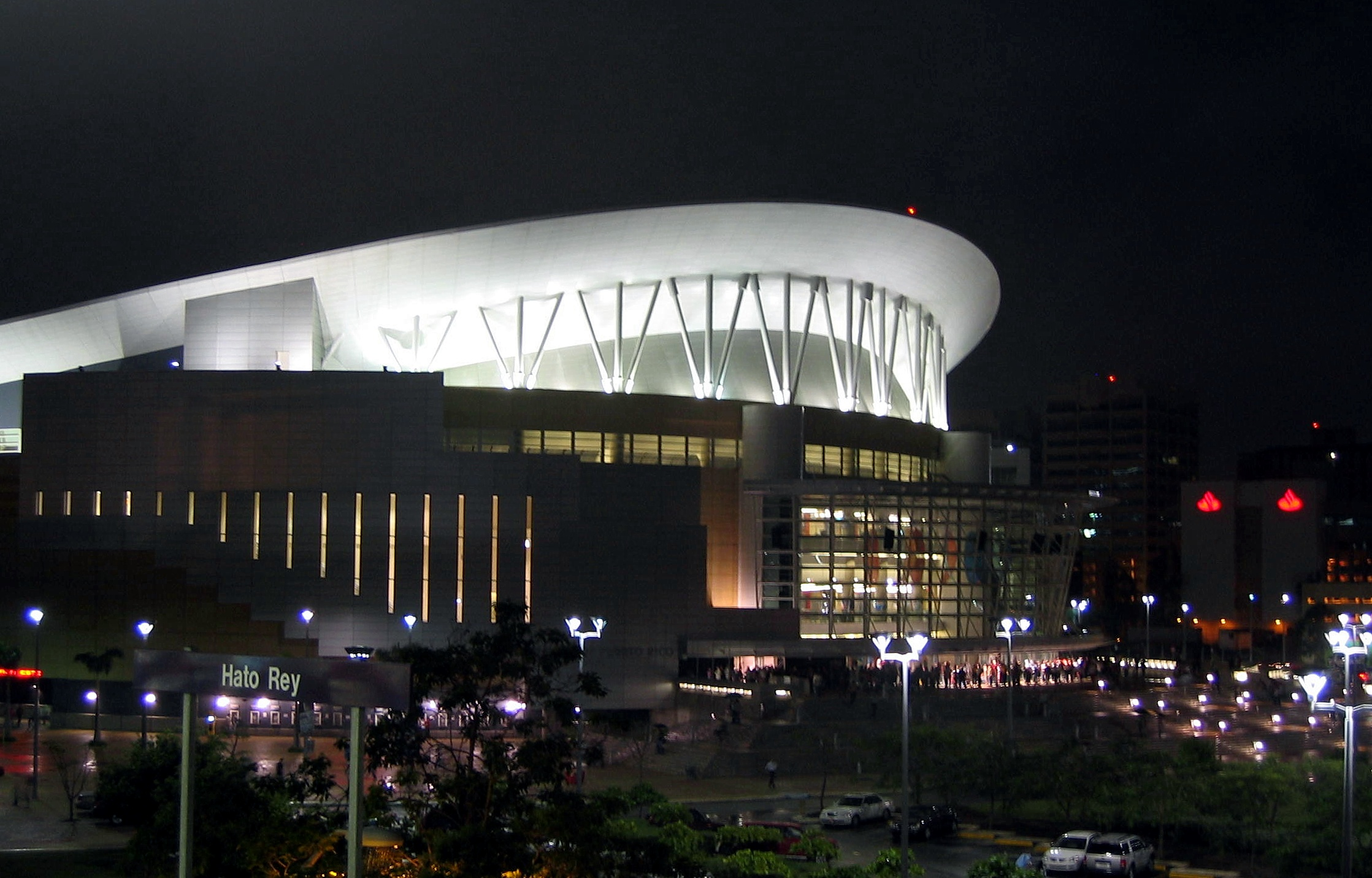
A night view of the José Miguel Agrelot Coliseum

Teams based in San Juan have been notably successful in athletic competition. The Santurce Crabbers won the National Superior Basketball League championship in 1998, 1999, 2000, 2001 and 2003 during this period being recognized as a dynasty. The San Juan Senators and the Santurce Crabbers were the two major baseball teams in the city, winning the championship of the Puerto Rican Professional Baseball League a total of 17 times. The Santurce Crabbers are located third among teams with more championships in the Caribbean Series, winning championships in the 1951, 1953, 1955, 1993 and 2000 editions of the tournament. The city has also been the host of events within the sports community; some examples include:

- Host of the 1966 Central American and Caribbean Games.
- Host of the 1979 Pan American Games.
- Hosted the Caribbean World Series nine times.
- Major League Baseball's Montreal Expos played 22 home games at Hiram Bithorn Stadium between 2003 and 2004. The team also briefly considered moving permanently to San Juan before relocating to Washington, D.C.
- Hosted the 2006, 2009 and 2013 World Baseball Classic at the Hiram Bithorn Stadium.
- Host of the 1974 FIBA World Championship (basketball).
- Host of the FIBA Americas Championship five times (1980, 1993, 1999, 2003, 2009).
- Hosted the first edition of World Wrestling Entertainment's pay per view New Year's Revolution was held at the José Miguel Agrelot Coliseum in January 2005.
- The Latin American Regional Special Olympics in February 2010.
- Host of Major League Baseball's 2010 "San Juan Series", three games of the Mets at Marlins held on June 28–30, 2010 at Hiram Bithorn Stadium.

The $28 million San Juan Natatorium attracts island-wide and regional swim meets, as well as winter training by top-rated mainland U.S. colleges and universities, including the United States Military Academy at West Point and the United States Naval Academy at Annapolis.

In July 2007, the San Juan Golf Academy and its driving range began operating atop the city's former sanitary landfill in Puerto Nuevo, and will eventually include the city's first and only 9-hole golf course.

=== Professional teams ===
Club	Sport	League	Venue
Cangrejeros de Santurce	Basketball	Baloncesto Superior Nacional	Roberto Clemente Coliseum
Cangrejeras de Santurce	Basketball	Baloncesto Superior Nacional Femenino	Roberto Clemente Coliseum
Cangrejeras de Santurce	Volleyball	Liga de Voleibol Superior Femenino	Roberto Clemente Coliseum
Cangrejeros de Santurce	Baseball	Puerto Rico Baseball League	Hiram Bithorn Stadium
Senadores de San Juan	Baseball	Puerto Rico Baseball League	Hiram Bithorn Stadium
Academia Quintana	Football/Balompié (Soccer)	Liga Puerto Rico Pro	Hiram Bithorn Stadium
Metropolitan FA	Football/Balompié (Soccer)	Liga Puerto Rico Pro	Parque Reparto Metropolitano
San Juan FC	Football/Balompié (Soccer)	Liga Puerto Rico Pro	Parque de Futbol Benjamin Martinez Gonzalez

== International relations ==
=== Diplomatic missions ===
Consulate-General: Colombia; Dominican Republic; Mexico; Spain; Venezuela	Honorary Consulates: Argentina; Austria; Belgium; Belize; Bolivia; Canada; Chile; Costa Rica; Czech Republic; Denmark; Ecuador; El Salvador; Finland; France; Georgia; Germany; Guatemala; Haiti; Hungary	Israel; Italy; Japan; Nicaragua; Norway; Panama; Paraguay; Peru; Poland; Portugal; Russia; South Korea; Sweden; Switzerland; Thailand; Trinidad & Tobago; United Kingdom; Uruguay

=== Twin towns – Sister cities ===
San Juan is twinned with:

Domestic: Jacksonville, Florida; Honolulu, Hawaii; Killeen, Texas	International: Cartagena, Colombia; Santiago, Dominican Republic; Guatemala City, Guatemala; San Juan, Philippines; Dubai, United Arab Emirates; Cádiz, Spain; Madrid, Spain

== See also ==
- List of the oldest buildings in Puerto Rico
- List of people from San Juan, Puerto Rico
- List of streets in San Juan, Puerto Rico
- Castillo San Cristóbal (San Juan)
- National Register of Historic Places listings in San Juan, Puerto Rico
- History of Puerto Rico
- List of former national capitals
- List of national capitals
- Military history of Puerto Rico
- Spanish Colonial architecture
- USS San Juan, 2 ships
