= Juan Pachot =

Puerto Rican softball player

Juan Pachot is a former softball player from Ponce, Puerto Rico who was inducted to the International Softball Federation Hall of Fame.

Pachot enjoyed a long career as a professional softball player, establishing himself as one of the best, and best-known, Puerto Rican players in that sport. His career spanned 25 years despite contracting polio at an early age.

Juan MVP represented Puerto Rico at the Pan American games, the World Championship of Softball and the Central American and Caribbean games. In the latter tournament he won three batting titles and was voted MVP twice. Juan Pachot retired with a batting average of .365.

In 1997, he became the fourth Puerto Rican to be inducted into the International Softball Federation Hall of Fame, joining Alejandro Cruz, among others. Ivelisse Echevarria and five other Puerto Ricans have subsequently joined Pachot at that museum.
