= Murder of Adam Anhang =

Murder occurred in Old San Juan, Puerto Rico in 2005

Adam Joel Anhang Uster (March 8, 1973 – September 23, 2005) was an entrepreneur and real estate developer; he was murdered at the intersection of Calle San Justo and Calle Luna in Old San Juan, Puerto Rico in September 2005. He was leaving the Pink Skirt Nightclub/Dragonfly Club with his estranged wife, Áurea Vázquez-Rijos, from whom he was finalizing a divorce, and was knifed and beaten to death on the street, while she suffered minor injuries during the attack. The event was highlighted as the Pink Skirt Murder in a television exposé on Dateline NBC. Vázquez-Rijos, known in the media as the "Black Widow", fled jurisdiction to Italy in 2006 but was discovered and extradited to Puerto Rico in 2015, and was convicted of being a co-conspirator in her husband's murder in October 2018.

== Adam Anhang's early life, education and career ==
Adam Joel Anhang was born and raised in Winnipeg, Manitoba, Canada. He began his undergraduate studies at Yeshiva University, serving as executive editor of the student newspaper and a competitive member of the fencing team. He completed his undergraduate degree at the Wharton School of Business at the University of Pennsylvania in Philadelphia. Following graduation, he returned to Wharton to give guest lectures on real estate.

Anhang's career focused on revitalizing neighborhoods through real estate development. After working at NorthStar Capital Investment Corporation (predecessor to NorthStar Realty), he started his own consulting business advising companies in various industries, including online gaming software company CWC Gaming. He invested in and developed properties in Puerto Rico; among other projects, he was part-owner of the Martineau Bay Resort (a former Wyndham Hotels & Resorts property) in Vieques, Puerto Rico.

== Marriage and dispute ==
Vázquez-Rijos was a former Miss Puerto Rico Petite winner. Anhang and Vázquez-Rijos signed a prenuptial agreement one day before they were married, as Anhang's net worth was estimated at more than $24 million while Vázquez-Rijos’s was only $62,300. Anhang's father Abraham said "The motive was greed. The whole [Vázquez] family had moved into their house and basically he had to move out. There was no doubt that they looked upon him as a meal ticket and he was dispensable. In fact, they convinced themselves that he was worth to them more dead than alive." Vázquez-Rijos would receive $8 million according to Adam's will if he was killed, much more than the maximum of $360,000 that she would get in a divorce.

When Vázquez-Rijos announced she was pregnant, Adam felt pressured by her family and the pair quietly married in March 2005 after signing a prenup agreement. However, Adam soon learned that the pregnancy had been a ruse, as “He came to realize quickly that it was all about the money and the prestige of being with him”. Within months, the marriage was falling apart and Adam became fearful of Vázquez-Rijos as she had alleged links to Puerto Rican organized crime, so he moved into his own apartment and hired a bodyguard, while initiating divorce proceedings.

== Murder ==
On an evening in September 2005, Adam agreed to have dinner with Vázquez-Rijos in order to finalize their divorce. Adam gave his bodyguard the night off so that talks could proceed more smoothly. However, it turned out that this dinner was a trap set by Vázquez-Rijos. Witnesses reported that when the assailant attacked and killed Adam, Vázquez-Rijos "didn’t scream, never ran, and even had a brief conversation with him before he pushed her to the ground and hurt her just enough to make it look like she had been a target, too".

== Initial investigation ==
The investigation and prosecution of those guilty of Anhang's murder was not straightforward. Jonathan Roman Rivera, a 22-year-old worker at the restaurant, was initially arrested for the murder of Anhang, convicted, and sentenced to 105 years by a local Puerto Rican courts. He had worked as a dishwasher at the Pink Skirt restaurant. The restaurant and nightclub had been bought by Adam for his wife, and Roman Rivera knew Vázquez-Rijos’s family. It was suspected at the time that Vázquez-Rijos was involved in her estranged husband's murder; the motive was that she stood to gain more financially from the death of her husband, to whom she had only been married for six months, than from the divorce. It was suspected that she bankrolled Roman's legal bills, since she had been represented by the same attorney.

After Roman's conviction, a subsequent independent FBI investigation exonerated Roman of the murder, and instead indicted Alex Pabón Colón as the murderer. Vázquez-Rijos was indicted for the criminal use of interstate commerce facilities in the commission of murder-for-hire. According to the June 4, 2008 indictment, Vázquez-Rijos offered Pabón three million dollars to murder her husband and, on that fateful night, lured her husband to an agreed-upon spot in Old San Juan, where Pabón killed him. Pabón pleaded guilty to the murder and cooperated with authorities. Roman was released and has sued the police and prosecutors for 12 million dollars.

== Main suspect's flight to Europe ==
In 2006, Ms. Vázquez-Rijos fled jurisdiction to Italy. While abroad, she sued in federal court the parents of Adam Anhang, claiming she had been cheated from inheriting his estate. However, in Áurea Vázquez-Rijos v. Abraham Anhang and Barbara Anhang, the US Federal court of appeals upheld a lower court verdict dismissing Ms. Vázquez-Rijos’s claims to the estate due to failure to appear for second deposition, and noting that she had been indicted for involvement in the murder of her husband.

Anhang's father Abraham, disbelieving the initial FBI case, hired the private investigator "Farouk" who was a Milan-based detective to track Vázquez-Rijos. Farouk reported back to the Anhang family that Vázquez-Rijos "felt bold enough to travel throughout Europe, including Gibraltar, France and England, always staying one step ahead of her pursuers." Abraham explained, “She had access to three or four identity cards, she was using three or four different names, different hairstyles, different hair colourings. So by the time we found out she had been in another country, she had already left it.” Abraham's investigation was shared with the Puerto Rico FBI who reopened a case on Vázquez-Rijos.

While in exile in Florence, Vázquez-Rijos gave birth to twin girls with an Italian citizen. This might have helped her avoid trial, since Italy bars the extradition of the mothers of Italian children, but the couple quickly separated after the father's family read stories about the "Black Widow of Puerto Rico" in the media and realized that she was that fugitive, and the father ultimately gained custody of the twins. In addition, according to US prosecutors, in June 2012, Ms. Vázquez-Rijos approached the Firenzebraica Jewish organisation in Florence with false paperwork to attempt to certify that she and her daughters were of Jewish descent, hoping to emigrate to Israel. The trial of Vázquez-Rijos remained stalled because of the reluctance of Italy to extradite individuals facing murder charges to countries who adjudicate the death penalty. This rationale has been applied to Ms. Vázquez-Rijos, despite the fact she is not indicted in a capital case. Capital punishment in Puerto Rico is forbidden by law.

== Arrest of main suspect ==
In August 2012, her brother, Charbel Vázquez Rijos, created a tourism company, titled Glatt Kosher Traveller's Incorporated, catering to Jewish tourists and employing Ms. Vázquez. The FBI and Spanish authorities set up a sting operation, luring Ms. Vázquez to Madrid to serve as a guide for a fictitious tour group. On June 30, 2013, the Spanish National Police (SNP) arrested fugitive Áurea Vázquez-Rijos at the Madrid airport as she was getting off a flight from Italy to work as a tour guide. The FBI then expected the extradition process from Spain could take between six and nine months. The agency said the arrest of the Puerto Rican fugitive was the result of a joint effort between the FBI's legal attaches, the U.S. Attorney's Office in Puerto Rico, Spanish police, Interpol and U.S. Department of Justice. Vázquez-Rijos' sister and her former husband were also charged and arrested in Puerto Rico in connection with Adam Anhang's murder.

While incarcerated in Spain, Ms. Vázquez became pregnant and had a baby. Allowed to marry the father in jail, and as the mother of a Spanish citizen, she attempted to have the Spanish court prevent her extradition. She was extradited to Puerto Rico in 2015, along with her month-old baby, who was placed in local non-parental custody. As part of the extradition procedure, U.S. federal prosecutors signed a sworn affidavit to Spanish authorities that they would not ask for the death penalty in the case.

== Extradition, arraignment and trial ==
Vázquez-Rijos' extradition was completed on September 24, 2015, when she was returned to San Juan, Puerto Rico under FBI custody. Vázquez-Rijos was brought before United States Magistrate Bruce McGiverin of the United States District Court for the District of Puerto Rico, who informed her of the details of the indictment against her. McGiverin stressed to the defendant that she faces life in prison if found guilty. The Magistrate also informed her that she would be assigned a public defender. Vázquez-Rijos was sent to the federal Metropolitan Detention Center in Guaynabo, Puerto Rico until her bail hearing on October 8, 2015. The trial was originally set to begin on August 28, 2017. Following multiple delays, it finally began on August 21, 2018.

At trial, witnesses testified that Vázquez-Rijos watched as her husband was murdered, and then reminded Pabón-Colón that he needed to inflict an injury on her, in order to create the impression that both of them were victims of robbery. Evidence showed that Pabón-Colón wrote letters attempting to collect the fee for being a hitman, but Vázquez-Rijos' sister Marcia responded to Pabón-Colón saying that they did not have the money.

On October 3, 2018, Vázquez-Rijos and two co-conspirators, her sister Marcia and ex-boyfriend José Ferrer Sosa, were all found guilty. All three faced life imprisonment, with a sentencing hearing initially scheduled for January 29, 2019, and then delayed three times.

On March 15, 2019, Áurea Vázquez-Rijos Rijos and her sister, Marcia Vázquez-Rijos Rijos and an ex-boyfriend of hers, José Ferrer Sosa, were all sentenced to life in prison. Áurea was assigned BOP#46255-069 and Marcia was given BOP#42102-069 and are now at FMC Carswell. Jose's status is unknown.

== Legal legacy of Anhang case ==
This case highlights the checkered recent record of the Puerto Rico Police and the American Justice system.

== See also ==
- Dan Markel, victim of a similar murder-for-hire conspiracy by his ex-in-laws, and close friend of Abraham Anhang’s son-in-law
