= Metropolitan Detention Center (disambiguation) =

A metropolitan detention center (MDC) is a United States Federal government detention facility.

Metropolitan Detention Center may also refer to:

- Metropolitan Detention Center, Brooklyn, New York, United States
- Metropolitan Detention Center, Guaynabo, Puerto Rico
- Metropolitan Detention Center, Los Angeles, California, United States

== Other prisons, unconnected to the federal MDCs ==
- Bernalillo County Metropolitan Detention Center, outside Albuquerque, New Mexico
