= Rita Gluzman =

Ukrainian-born activist and murderer

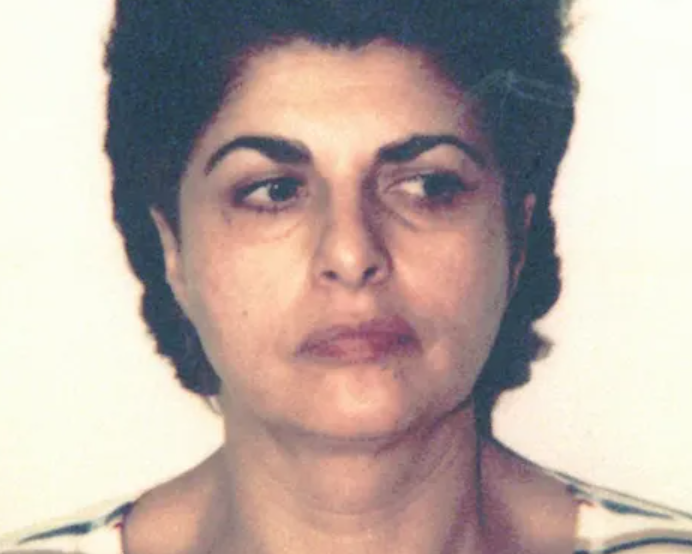
- Gluzman in US federal custody (1996)
- Born: 1948 (age 77–78); Ukrainian SSR, Soviet Union (now Ukraine)
- Other name: The Jewish Lizzie Borden
- Status: Released
- Motive: Revenge against husband over impending divorce
- Conviction: Interstate domestic violence resulting in death
- Penalty: Life imprisonment

Details
- Victims: Yakov Gluzman, 48
- Date: April 6, 1996
- Country: United States
- State: New York

Rita Gluzman (born 1948) is an American activist and convicted murderer. Gluzman first came to prominence in the 1970s when she successfully pressured the Soviet Union to allow her husband, scientist Yakov Gluzman, to emigrate to Israel with the rest of their family. The couple later moved to the United States. In 1996, Gluzman conspired with her cousin, Vladimir Zelinin, to murder Yakov after he filed for divorce. Gluzman became the first woman to be convicted under the United States Violence Against Women Act. She was sentenced to life imprisonment, but was released from prison on health grounds in 2020.

== Biography ==
Gluzman raised in Chernivtsi, Soviet Ukraine. Her parents were survivors of the Holocaust. Gluzman was raped by a police officer when she was 10 years old. Her mother told her not to discuss the rape with anyone. Afterwards, Gluzman's father was sent to an internment camp. When Gluzman was 11 years old, her mother abandoned her for two years, and she had to take care of her younger sister on her own. During this time, the two survived by picking through garbage and eating handouts by neighbors. She married Yakov Gluzman in 1969, whom she had known since primary school. The Gluzmans had a son, Ilan Gluzman.

=== Activism ===
In 1971, Gluzman launched a public campaign to pressure the Soviet government to allow her husband to emigrate with her to Israel. Gluzman's father waited fifteen years for a permit from the government to allow his family to leave, but the permit did not include Gluzman's husband. After five more years, Soviet authorities refused to grant Yakov a permit and told his family that they would leave the Soviet Union without him if they wished to leave at all. Gluzman was pregnant, and thus decided to leave for Israel with hopes that her husband could follow eventually.

As Yakov's appeals were continually struck down, Rita temporarily relocated to the United States. Her visa was sponsored by Congressman Jack Kemp. She spoke across the U.S. and reportedly went on an 18-day hunger strike to generate interest in her case. She also met with multiple UN officials, including then-UN Ambassador Rita Hauser. Gluzman spurred interest in her case by providing numerous interviews, and advocated for individuals to petition the then-Russian ambassador Anatoly Dobrynin for her husband's release. She was able to persuade George H. W. Bush, Secretary-General U Thant, and Canadian Prime Minister Pierre Trudeau to petition for her cause.

In October 1971, Gluzman spoke before the American Jewish Welfare Federation Leadership Forum in Atlanta, Georgia, and her story appeared on the front page of the Atlanta Constitution. Atlanta Alderman Wyche Fowler mistakenly thought that she was an Atlanta constituent, and took a clipping of the newspaper story with him to Kyiv. A high-ranking official learned about Gluzman's story from Fowler, and brought it to other Communist Party officials. That night, Fowler was told that Yakov would be granted leave to emigrate. On November 25, Gluzman reunited with Yakov in Vienna, Austria. Two days later, the couple reached Israel, where they settled with Rita's parents. The couple then planned to study at Tel Aviv University, where Yakov continued his study of biology and Rita continued her study of chemistry.

=== Murder of Yakov Gluzman ===
By 1996, Yakov was an accomplished cancer researcher and co-owned a electroplating company, E.C.I. Technology, with Rita. However, that year, Yakov filed for divorce; he claimed that Rita was abusive and spent too much money, while Rita asserted that Yakov was having an extramarital affair with a woman in Israel. Federal agents later asserted that Rita went to Israel to collect photos of Yakov with another woman, then used the photos to blackmail him. She also illegally phonetapped him. Police asserted that Rita feared a costly divorce and giving up control of the company.

Yakov was murdered on April 6, 1996 in his home in Rockland County, New York. He was stabbed and struck with an axe, and his body was chopped into pieces with a hacksaw. Rita's cousin, Vladimir Zelenin, was charged with conspiracy to commit murder after police found him preparing to throw ten garbage bags containing Yakov's body parts into the Passaic River. Zelenin was also covered in Yakov's blood.

Gluzman went missing for six days after her husband's death, until she was found by police on Long Island and arrested on April 12. She was found breaking into a guest cabin owned by Yakov's former employer. Gluzman's car had a stolen license plate, and a passport and travel books for Switzerland and Australia were found inside.

Gluzman, who had been living away from her husband in Upper Saddle River, New Jersey, was charged with violating the Violence Against Women Act, which criminalizes crossing state lines while intending to injure or intimidate a spouse or partner. She was the first woman to be charged under this law, and the first individual to be charged for murder under the law. Federal charges were allegedly brought because there was a lack of physical evidence to corroborate the witness account of Zelenin, who turned against Gluzman.

During the trial, Zelenin testified that Gluzman helped him immigrate to the U.S. and find a job at her company. Gluzman also told Zelenin that if Yakov was allowed to get a divorce, Zelenin would be out of work because ECI would go out of business. Zelenin alleged Gluzman plotted her husband's murder, and took Zelenin to Home Depot and Grand Union for an axe, a hatchet, and garbage bags, for the murder. The two of them attacked Yakov in his apartment and killed him with an axe and a hatchet. Gluzman cleaned the scene, while Zelenin dismembered the body. Gluzman's defense claimed that Zelenin acted alone.

On April 30, 1997, Gluzman was sentenced to life in prison after being convicted on a federal charge of interstate domestic violence resulting in death. After her sentencing, Gluzman appealed her sentence, claiming her conviction was unconstitutional. Her appeal was denied.

Tabloids described Gluzman as the "Jewish Lizzie Borden".

Zelenin was released from prison on January 8, 2015.

On July 28, 2020, Gluzman was granted a compassionate release after she experienced several medical issues including multiple strokes and a diagnosis of early Parkinson's disease. She was released from the Federal Medical Center, Carswell in Fort Worth, Texas and headed to Hackensack, New Jersey, where she planned to reside with her sister. She began her five year court-ordered supervised release immediately after. According to the conditions for her supervised release, Gluzman will be confined to her home with few exceptions and will have to wear a GPS monitoring device.
