= Jorge Báez Pagán =

Puerto Rican politician

Member of the Puerto Rico House of Representatives from the at-large district
- In office September 24, 2020 – January 2021
- Preceded by: María Milagros Charbonier
- Succeeded by: María de Lourdes Ramos Rivera

Personal details
- Born: Jorge Emmanuel Báez Pagán Guaynabo, Puerto Rico
- Party: New Progressive Party
- Education: Interamerican University of Puerto Rico (B.Ed., MBA)

External video
- You may view an interview with Báez Pagán on WAPA-TV

Jorge Emmanuel Báez Pagán is a Puerto Rican educator and politician. He served as an at-large member of the Puerto Rico House of Representatives from 2020 to 2021. He was its first openly gay member representative.

== Biography ==
Báez Pagán is from Guaynabo, Puerto Rico. He is a special education and history teacher in the Abraham Lincoln School in San Juan. He was a college election official in 2008, and between 2010 and 2014 he was president of the Statehood Youth of Guaynabo, his hometown, and regional director between 2014 and 2018. In 2016, as a New Progressive Party (PNP) candidate to be an At-Large member of the House of Representatives, he ran on a platform of securing payment to special education therapists. He lost the election, however, in 2017, he ran to be vice president of the Puerto Rico Statehood Students Association. Ahead of the 2020 Primaries in Puerto Rico, he announced his liberal platform, including, among other things,

give a $200 voucher to every teacher for purchase of school supplies; create the Recycling Program in all schools of the Department of Education; [give a] [h]elping hand to the small and medium-sized businesses; protect LGBTTIQ and disadvantaged people's rights; [p]romote entrepeneurship aimed at young people; [e]stablish IVU recollection by the municipalities to avoid tax evasion; free pet sterilization; [i]mproving [,] in terms of space[,] in our school to services related to: speech and language therapy, ocupational therapy, physical...and psychological therapy...and open a Specialized School in Sector Canta Gallo [in his home barrio of Santa Rosa, Guaynabo].

He also stated he was in favor of term limits for members of the Legislative Assembly. On 16 August 2020, with 119,883 (or 10% of the ballots cast), he became the "first openly gay individual to be elected in a primary for Puerto Rico." The primaries also had another five gay candidates, however, none were from the PNP. Additionally, he was the only newcomer on the ballot, hence his campaigning as a "new alternative", since the other four were House incumbents. His sexual orientation was noticed by local media, as he had obtained enough votes to displace conservative, anti-LGBT representative María Milagros Charbonier, who had a record of equating homosexuality to pedophilia and bestiality. When she was arrested for allegations of fraud, but before she had resigned her to the House, Báez Pagán said that she now had the time to dedicate to justice and that in public service "one comes to serve others, not to serve themselves." He ran a self-funded campaign with an investment of $4,000.00

On September 24, 2020, Báez Pagán became the first openly gay member of the House of Representatives in the island's history. In the 2020 Puerto Rico House of Representatives election, he was displaced by María de Lourdes Ramos Rivera.
