= Museum of Transportation of Puerto Rico =

Former transport museum in Guaynabo, Puerto Rico

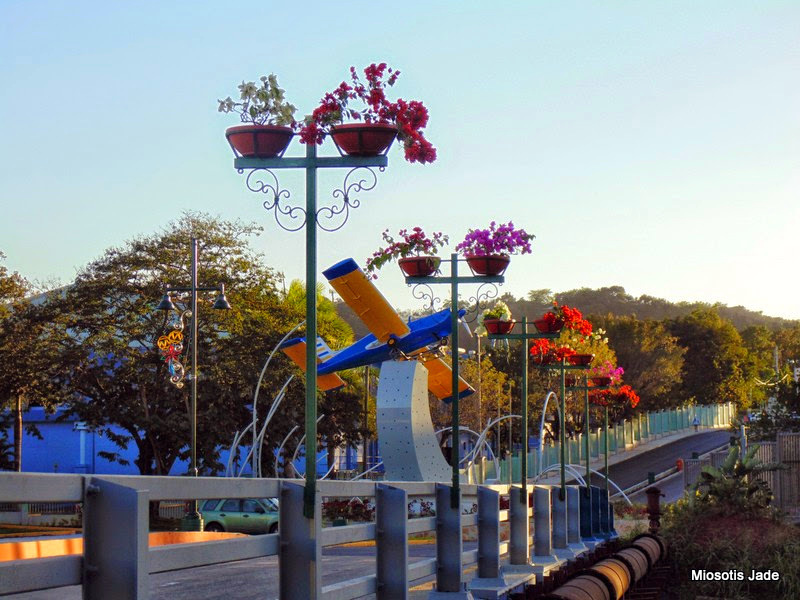
- Museum of Transportation
- Established: 2013
- Location: Road PR 837 Corner Cecilio Urbina, Guaynabo, Puerto Rico
- Coordinates: 18°21′31″N 66°06′56″W,
- Type: Transport museum

The Museum Of Transportation (MOT) of Puerto Rico is a museum located in the town of Guaynabo, Puerto Rico which documents the history of transportation in Puerto Rico, from the canoes used by the natives, to the actual subway system located in the metro area known as the "Tren Urbano" (Urban Train).

Founded in 2013, the museum began as an initiative by a group of local automotive enthusiasts. Consisting of an architecturally rich design inspired by other great and renowned museums from around the globe. The building consists on three floors and over 35,000 s/f housing exhibitions from original horse-drawn carriages and ox wagon, to cars from the late 1950s to the present. The MOT includes historic motoring photographs, decorative walls, vintage neon signs, antique cars, bicycles and motorcycles.

In April 2019, the mayor announced the Museum would be closing its doors.

== Exhibits ==
The first floor of the MOT hosts a permanent exhibition documenting the history of transportation in Puerto Rico including a horse carriage and 1900s ox wagon, a miniature community mock-up with a functional railroad, maritime and aviation memorabilia, and a flight simulator.

The second floor hosts an automotive exhibition consisting on various themes for a total of four exhibitions per year. Some of the past themes have been: Corvette 60th Anniversary, a Volkswagen exhibition, British cars exhibition, Ford Mustang exhibition and more. The second floor is also home to the MOT's race car simulator as well as racing memorabilia from renowned drivers such as Diego Febles and Chiqui Soldevilla. Among the racing memorabilia is Febles' 1978 1st-place trophy from the 24 Hours of Daytona, his 1982 1st-place trophy for the 12 Hours of Sebring as well as other trophies, original race suits, pictures, helmets and other memorabilia.

The third floor consists of a lounge cafe and a conference room available for rent and fully equipped for seminars and various other activities.
