= Metropolitan Detention Center, Guaynabo =

United States federal prison facility in Guaynabo, Puerto Rico

Coordinates: 18°25′24″N 66°06′45″W

Federal Correctional Institution, Guaynabo
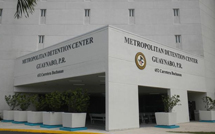
- Interactive map of Federal Correctional Institution, Guaynabo
- Location: Guaynabo, Puerto Rico
- Status: Operational
- Security class: All security levels
- Population: 1,725
- Opened: 1993
- Managed by: Federal Bureau of Prisons

The Metropolitan Detention Center, Guaynabo (MDC Guaynabo) is a United States federal prison facility in Guaynabo, Puerto Rico. It holds male and female inmates of all security levels who are awaiting trial or sentencing. It is operated by the Federal Bureau of Prisons, a division of the United States Department of Justice.

MDC Guaynabo is located next to Fort Buchanan U.S. Army base, and is 6 miles (9.7 km) west of San Juan, the capital of Puerto Rico.

In the wake of the destruction of Hurricane Maria in September 2017, some 1200 federal prisoners were transferred from Guaynabo to the Federal Correctional Institution, Yazoo City in Mississippi. Those 1200 were returned to Guaynabo in the first quarter of 2018, along with other prisoners who had been temporarily held in Atlanta, Georgia, Talladega Alabama, and Miami, Florida.

== Notable incidents ==
In 2010, an FBI investigation uncovered a conspiracy to distribute cocaine, heroin, marijuana, Percocet, and Xanax to an inmate at MDC Guaynabo. Several conspirators, led by Juan Rios-Ortiz, also attempted to provide cellular telephones, chargers, and SIM cards to an inmate of MDC. Rios-Ortiz worked for a company that had a contract to supply produce to the prison kitchen. Rios-Ortiz was subsequently convicted of conspiracy to distribute controlled substances, distribution of controlled substances, and providing contraband to an inmate of a federal prison.

On February 26, 2013, Osvaldo Albarati, a lieutenant for the Federal Bureau of Prisons, was shot and killed in what is believed to be retaliation for his investigations into cellphone smuggling at MDC Guaynabo. He had just left the facility and was driving home when several gunmen opened fire on his vehicle on the De Diego Expressway near Bayamon. Albarati worked in the investigative branch at the prison, where he was responsible for investigating crime within the prison, including drug smuggling and illegal cellphone use. Authorities have said his killing may have been contracted by powerful drug kingpins being held at the facility in reprisal for recent seizures he spearheaded. The FBI investigated the killing and no charges were filed.

On March 24, 2020 as a result of the COVID-19 pandemic, the prison reported that it was operating on a modified schedule and inmates were not allowed visitors.

== Notable inmates (current and former) ==
Inmate Name	Register Number	Photo	Status	Details
José Figueroa Agosto	35318-069		Released on March 27, 2020.	Leader of the largest drug trafficking organization in the Caribbean; apprehended in 2010 after ten years as Puerto Rico's most wanted fugitive and indicted for drug trafficking conspiracy and money laundering; known as the "Pablo Escobar of the Caribbean."
Áurea Vázquez-Rijos	46255-069		Transferred to FMC Carswell. Serving life sentences.	Sisters convicted in 2018 for murdering Aurea's estranged husband Adam Joel Anhang Uster in 2005.
Marcia Vázquez-Rijos	42102-069		Transferred to FMC Carswell. Serving life sentences.	Sisters convicted in 2018 for murdering Aurea's estranged husband Adam Joel Anhang Uster in 2005.
Al Sharpton	21458-069		Held for two days; transferred to MDC Brooklyn for seven weeks before being released on August 17, 2001.	Baptist minister, political activist and current MSNBC television host; convicted of trespassing on federal property for protesting against the US military presence on the island of Vieques, Puerto Rico.
Edward James Olmos	21554-069		Served 20 days; released on August 24, 2001.	Convicted of trespassing on federal property for protesting against the US military presence on the island of Vieques, Puerto Rico.
Félix Verdejo	51145-069		Transferred to USP Pollock. Serving a life sentence.	Former Olympic boxer convicting of the kidnapping and murder of Keishla Rodríguez Ortiz and their unborn child.
David Oquendo-Rivas	34348-069		Transferred to FCI Coleman. Serving a life sentence.	Convicted in 2013 for the 2009 Sabana Seca massacre
Alexis Candelario-Santana	34421-069		Transferred to FCI McDowell. Serving a life sentence.	Convicted in 2013 for the 2009 Sabana Seca massacre
Emmanuel Gazmey-Santiago	48816-069		Served 30 month sentence; released July 17, 2018.	Latin trap artist known as Anuel AA, convicted of illegal possession of firearms.

== See also ==
- List of U.S. federal prisons
- Federal Bureau of Prisons
- Incarceration in the United States
