= Héctor O'Neill =

Puerto Rican politician

Mayor of Guaynabo, Puerto Rico
- In office April 17, 1993 – June 5, 2017
- Preceded by: Alejandro Cruz
- Succeeded by: Ángel Pérez Otero

Member of the Puerto Rico Senate from the Bayamón district
- In office 1988–1993

Personal details
- Born: June 20, 1945 (age 81) Guaynabo, Puerto Rico
- Party: New Progressive Party (PNP)
- Spouse: Alba N. Alvelo
- Children: 8
- Education: Interamerican University of Puerto Rico (BBA)
- Profession: Politician, businessman

Héctor O'Neill García (born June 20, 1945) is a Puerto Rican politician who served as the mayor of his hometown of Guaynabo from 1993 to 2017. O'Neill is affiliated with the New Progressive Party (PNP) and has also served as a member of the Senate of Puerto Rico.

== Early years and studies ==
Héctor O'Neill García was born on June 20, 1945, in Barrio Hato Nuevo of Guaynabo. His parents are Adrián O'Neill Meléndez and Heriberta García González. O'Neill studied his primary school at the Agustín Lizardi School in Hato Nuevo. He continued his studies at the Miguel Such Vocational School in Río Piedras where he graduated with a degree in car body repair and mechanics.

Already in his 50s, he enrolled at the Interamerican University of Puerto Rico, Metropolitan Campus in Río Piedras. In 1999, he obtained his bachelor's degree in business administration, with a major in management. He was exalted to the Board of Honor due to his high GPA.

== Professional career ==
Shortly after graduating in the 1960s, O'Neill opened his own mechanic shop. Eventually he started working as an insurance adjuster.

In 1970, he worked as an inspector for the Puerto Rico Cooperative. From 1973 to 1977, he worked as administrator of Public Works in Guaynabo.

== Political career ==
O'Neill began his political career in 1970 when he served as secretary of the political organization Acción Progresista. In 1971, he was elected vice-president of the New Progressive Party Youth. The next year, he was elected to the Municipal Assembly of Guaynabo, while only 25 years old.

In 1981, he served as executive aide to the vice president and Speaker of the Puerto Rico House of Representatives. During that time, he collaborated with the Rules and Calendar Committee, among others. That year, he also began working as executive aide to then mayor of Guaynabo, Alejandro Cruz until 1986. That year, he started working as an adviser in administrative affairs and public politics of Guaynabo until 1988.

O'Neill ran for the Senate of Puerto Rico at the 1988 general elections. He was elected to represent the District of Bayamón, which includes his hometown of Guaynabo. O'Neill was sworn in January, 1989. During that term, he served Minority Speaker in several committees. He was reelected at the 1992 general elections.

In 1993, after the sudden death of mayor Alejandro Cruz, O'Neill decided to run for the seat. He was elected in a special election held on April 2, 1993, and was sworn in April 7, 1993. After that, he has been reelected in five consecutive terms (1996, 2000, 2004, 2008, and 2012). During the 2008 election, he received 70% of the votes, being one of the mayors with the largest margin of victory.

O'Neill occupies several positions of leadership within the New Progressive Party (PNP). He is a member of the board, as well as president of the party in Guaynabo. He was also president of the Puerto Rico Mayors Federation.

O'Neill was suspended from his job as mayor of Guaynabo on May 24, 2017. He resigned June 5. He was succeeded by former Rep. Angel Pérez-Otero.

== Personal life ==
O'Neill is married to Alba N. Alvelo. He has eight other children from his previous marriages: Héctor, Edward, Kenneth, Mike, Juvelt, Yamal, Ryan y Ronald.

== Scandal ==
On October 27, 2016, it was revealed that a female police officer had filed a complaint against O'Neill for sexual harassment. Both Puerto Rico governor Ricardo Rosselló and resident commissioner Jenniffer González have condemned him and called for him to step down. On June 5, 2017, O'Neill resigned from the position of mayor.
