= Guaynabo barrio-pueblo =

Historical and administrative center (seat) of Guaynabo, Puerto Rico

Guaynabo barrio-pueblo Pueblo de Guaynabo
- Municipality seat
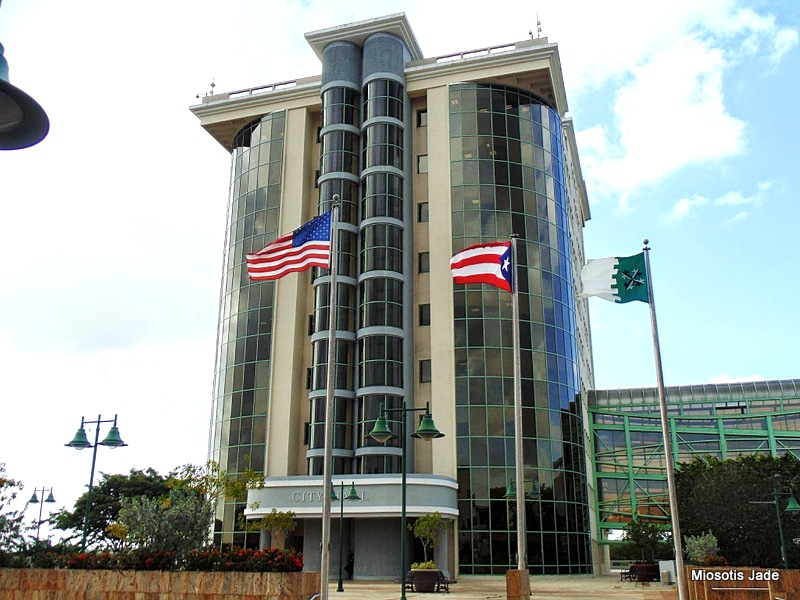
- Guaynabo City Hall

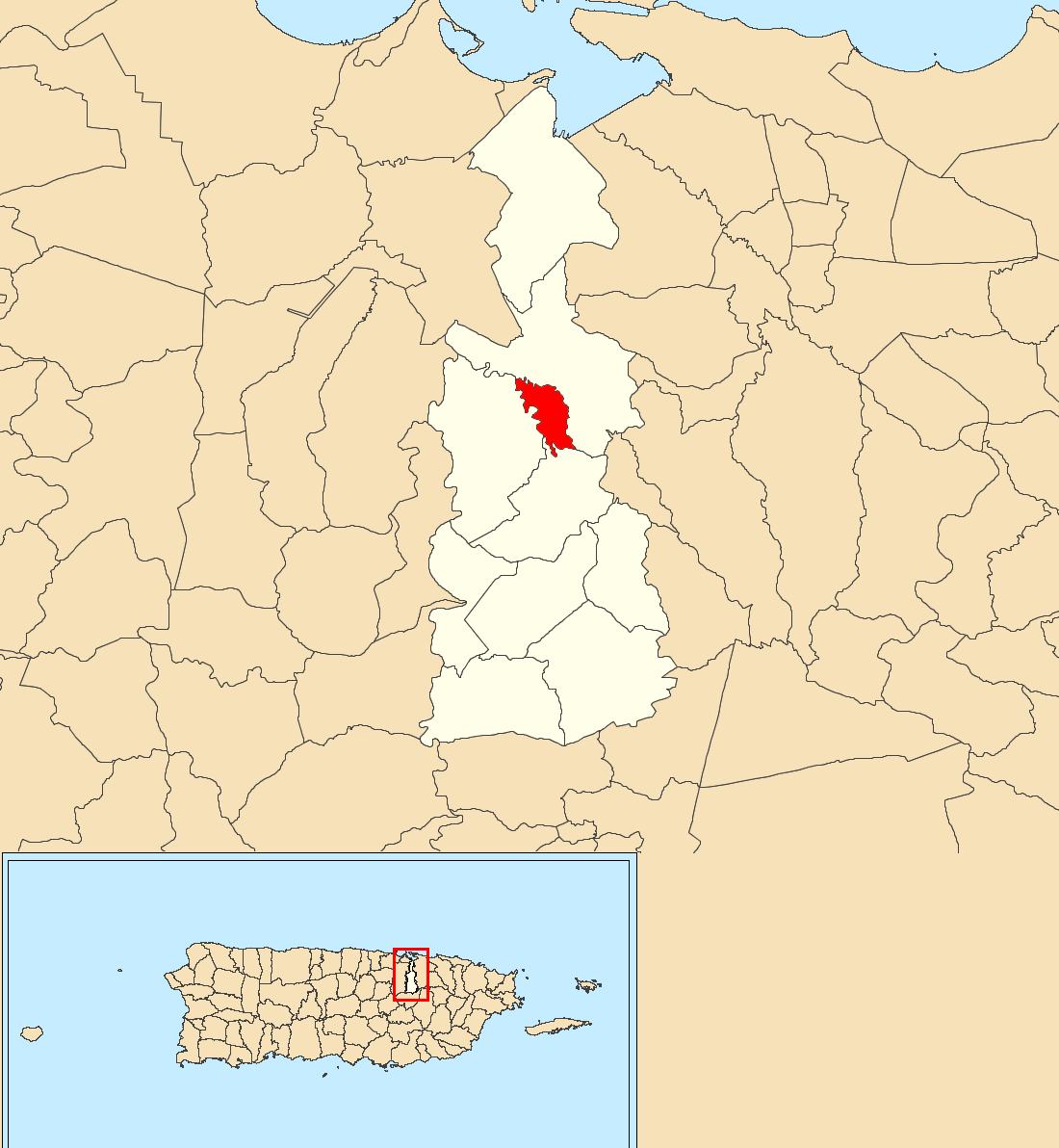
- Location of Guaynabo barrio-pueblo within the municipality of Guaynabo shown in red

- Location of Puerto Rico
- Coordinates: 18°21′37″N 66°06′46″W
- Commonwealth: Puerto Rico
- Municipality: Guaynabo

Area
  - Total: 0.59 sq mi (1.5 km^{2})
  - Land: 0.59 sq mi (1.5 km^{2})
  - Water: 0 sq mi (0 km^{2})
- Elevation: 102 ft (31 m)

Population (2010)
  - Total: 4,008
  - Density: 6,793.2/sq mi (2,622.9/km^{2})
- Source: 2010 Census
- Time zone: UTC−4 (AST)

Guaynabo barrio-pueblo is a barrio and the administrative center (seat) of Guaynabo, a municipality of Puerto Rico. Its population in 2010 was 4,008.

As was customary in Spain, in Puerto Rico, the municipality has a barrio called pueblo which contains a central plaza, the municipal buildings (city hall), and a Catholic church. Fiestas patronales (patron saint festivals) are held in the central plaza every year.

Historical population
Census	Pop.	Note	%±
1900	465		—
1910	555		19.4%
1920	686		23.6%
1930	939		36.9%
1940	1,128		20.1%
1950	2,157		91.2%
1960	3,343		55.0%
1970	0		−100.0%
1980	2,449		—
1990	2,962		20.9%
2000	3,056		3.2%
2010	4,008		31.2%
U.S. Decennial Census; 1899 (shown as 1900) 1910-1930; 1930-1950 1980-2000 2010

== The central plaza and its church ==
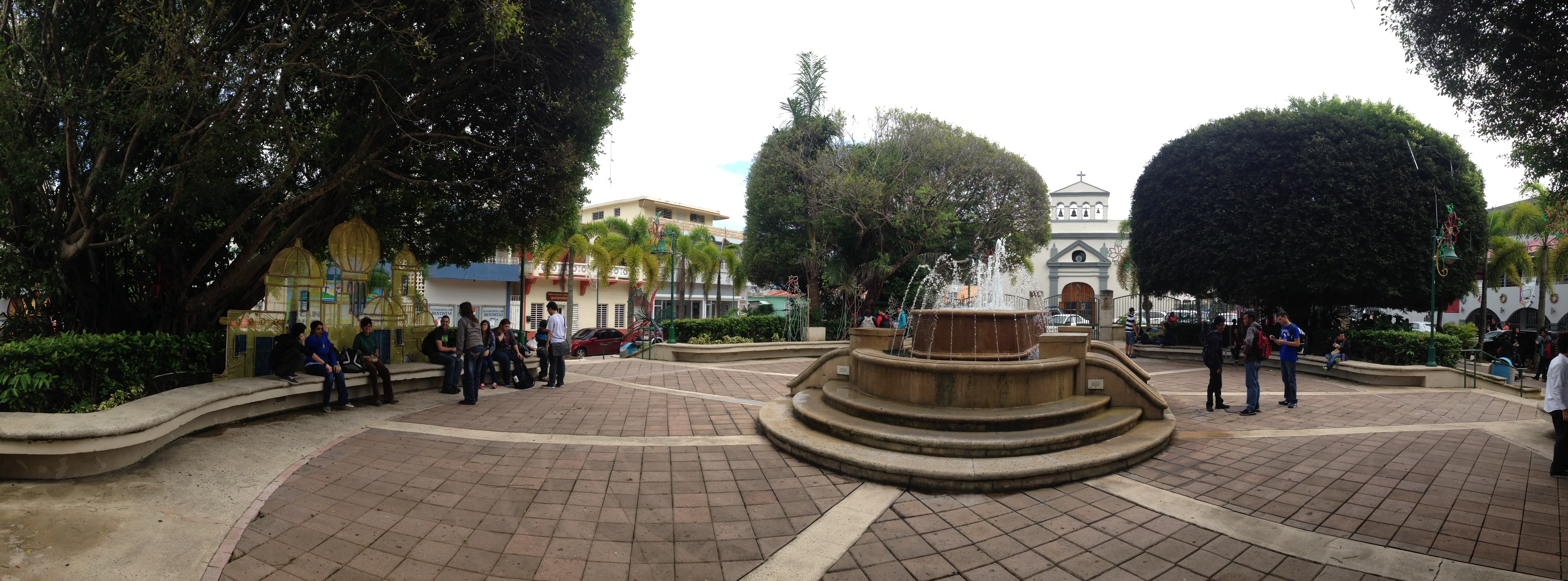
Central plaza of Guaynabo

The central plaza, or square, is a place for official and unofficial recreational events and a place where people can gather and socialize from dusk to dawn. The Laws of the Indies, Spanish law, which regulated life in Puerto Rico in the early 19th century, stated the plaza's purpose was for "the parties" (celebrations, festivities) (Spanish: a propósito para las fiestas), and that the square should be proportionally large enough for the number of neighbors (Spanish: grandeza proporcionada al número de vecinos). These Spanish regulations also stated that the streets nearby should be comfortable portals for passersby, protecting them from the elements: sun and rain.

Located across the central plaza in Guaynabo barrio-pueblo is the Parroquia San Pedro Mártir, a Roman Catholic church.

== History ==
Guaynabo barrio-pueblo was in Spain's gazetteers until Puerto Rico was ceded by Spain in the aftermath of the Spanish–American War under the terms of the Treaty of Paris of 1898 and became an unincorporated territory of the United States. In 1899, the United States Department of War conducted a census of Puerto Rico finding that the population of Guaynabo Pueblo was 465.

In July 2020, Federal Emergency Management Agency appropriated funds for repairs to Guaynabo's plaza.

== Sectors ==
Barrios (which are, in contemporary times, roughly comparable to minor civil divisions) in turn are further subdivided into smaller local populated place areas/units called sectores (sectors in English). The types of sectores may vary, from normally sector to urbanización to reparto to barriada to residencial, among others.

The following sectors are in Guaynabo barrio-pueblo:

Barriada Fuentes, Barrio Frailes Llano, Condominios Altos Reales, Condominios Balcones de Guaynabo, Condominios Balcones de San Pedro, Condominios Chalets del Parque, Condominios Monte Mayor, Condominios Murano Luxury Apartments, Condominios Palmar del Río, Condominios Parque Real, Condominios Plaza del Palmar, Condominios Portal de Sofía, Condominios Villas de Guaynabo, Hogar Golden Retirement, Reparto Piñeiro, Residencial Jardines de Guaynabo, Residencial Villas de Mabó, Sector Cubita, Sector Guzmán, Sector Honduras, Sector Marrero, Urbanización Colimar, Urbanización Colinas Metropolitanas, Urbanización Estancias Reales, Urbanización Mansiones de Guaynabo, Urbanización Mansiones Reales, Urbanización Palma Real, Urbanización Quintas Reales, Urbanización Reparto Esperanza, and Urbanización Villas Reales.

== Gallery ==
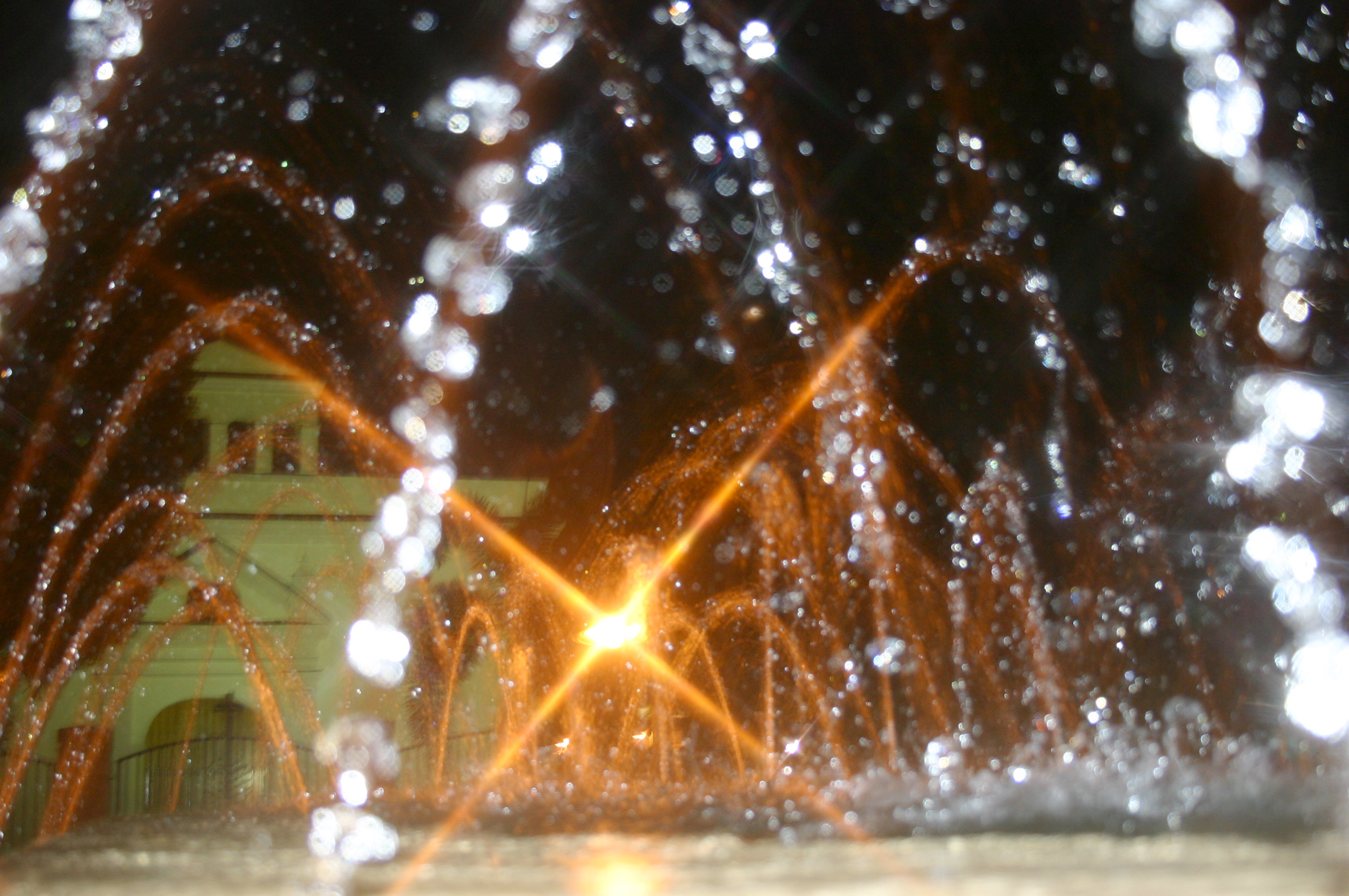
The fountain at the Central Plaza of Guaynabo at night

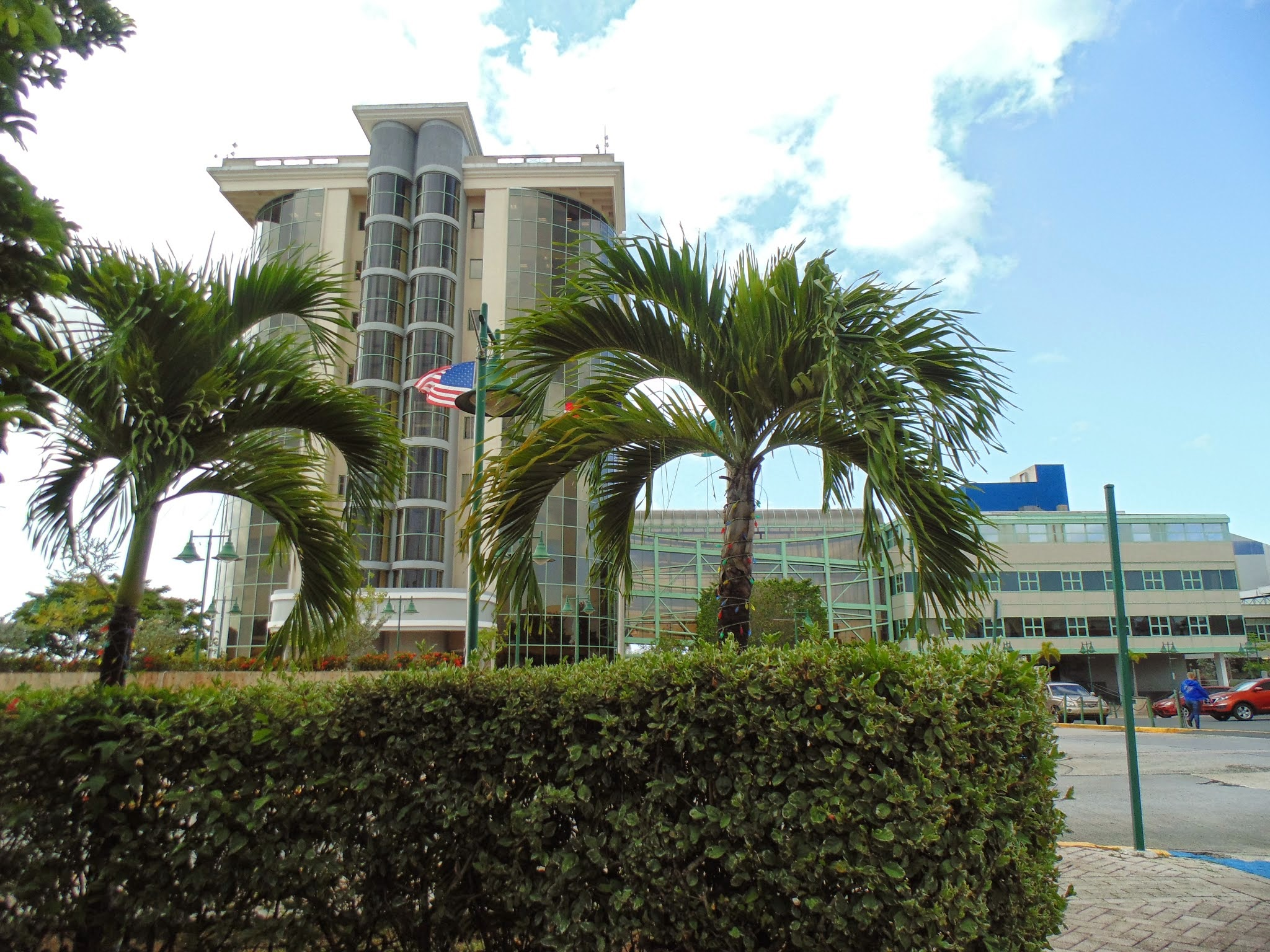
Guaynabo City Hall

== See also ==
- Streetview
- List of communities in Puerto Rico
- List of barrios and sectors of Guaynabo, Puerto Rico
