= Alejandro Cruz (politician) =

Former mayor of Guaynabo

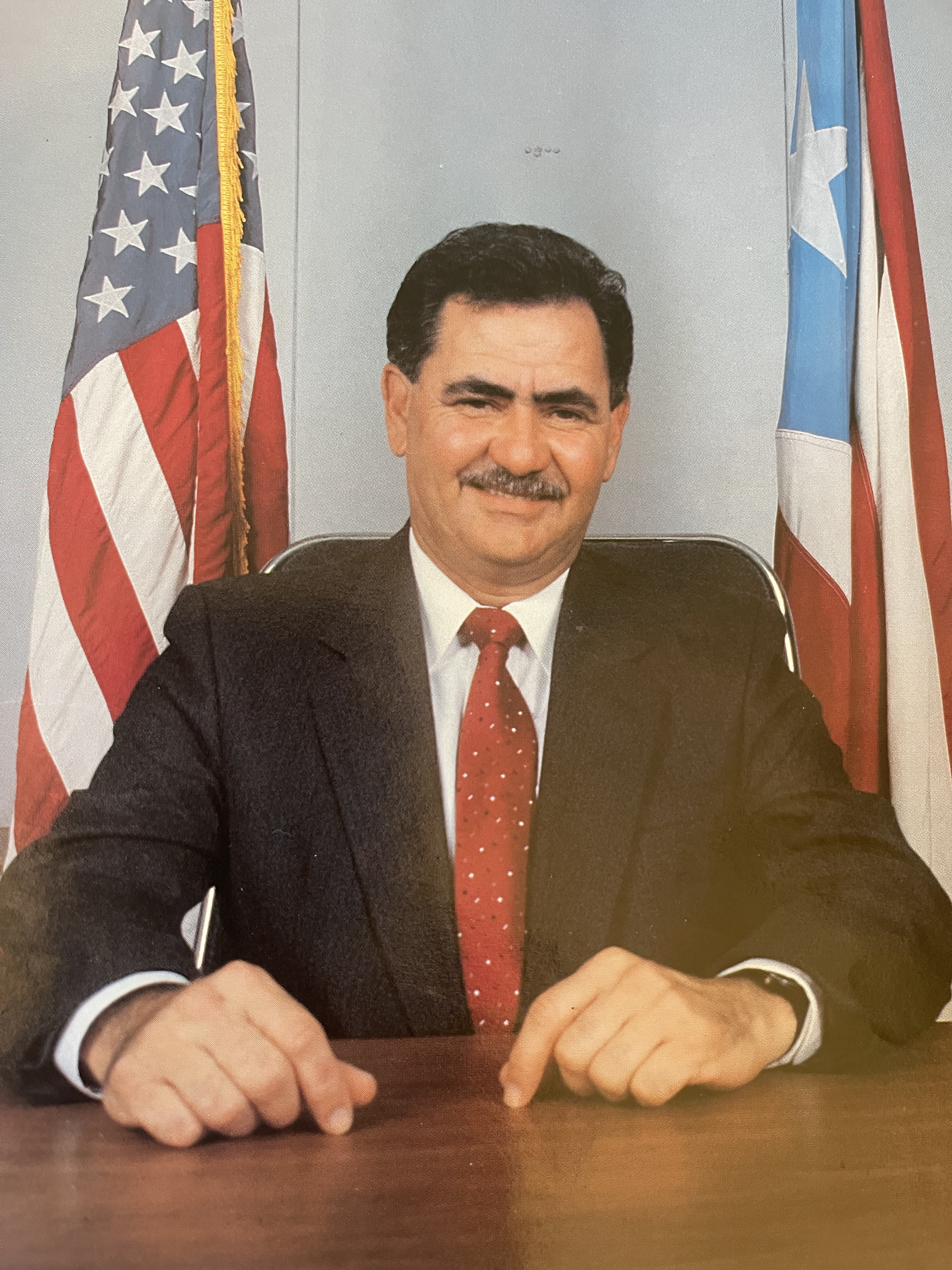

Mayor of Guaynabo, Puerto Rico
- In office 1980–1993
- Preceded by: Ebenezer Rivera
- Succeeded by: Héctor O'Neill

Member of the Puerto Rico House of Representatives from the 40th District
- In office January 2, 1976 – January 2, 1980
- Preceded by: Ernesto Cabrera Alejandro
- Succeeded by: Salomón Rondón Tollens

Personal details
- Born: January 6, 1938 Toa Alta, Puerto Rico
- Died: March 17, 1993 (aged 55) Guaynabo, Puerto Rico
- Party: New Progressive Party (PNP)
- Spouse(s): Viveca Bosch Ramírez; Rosa L. Cosme Amador (1960-1984 divorced)
- Children: Ivette Yolanda Cruz Cosme, Alex Manuel Cruz Cosme, Alexander Cruz Cosme, Juan Carlos Cruz Cosme(deceased), Alejandra Paola Cruz Bosch, Claudia Cruz Bosch
- Education: University of Puerto Rico (B.Ed.), 1959
- Profession: Educator (Margarita Janer Palacios High School-1960-1973), Politician, Athlete, Author

Alejandro "Junior" Cruz Ortiz (January 6, 1938 – March 17, 1993) was a Puerto Rican political leader, teacher, and coach of Puerto Rico's National Women Softball team. He was mayor of the city of Guaynabo during the 1980s and early 1990s.

== Biography ==
Alejandro Cruz made his mark in sports as well as politics in Puerto Rico. He served as mayor of the City of Guaynabo for three 4-year terms from 1980 to 1993. In addition to being a mayor, he was president of the Municipal Federation of Mayors, second vice-president of the New Progressive Party, vice president of the local Republican party chapter, and president of Puerto Rico Softball Federation.

Cruz was born in Toa Alta, Puerto Rico. His father was Alejandro Cruz Perez and his mother was Marta Ortiz. At the age of one, his family moved to the Barrio Santa Rosa III in Guaynabo. In 1955, he enrolled at the University of Puerto Rico. He was undecided between a degree as a physical education teacher or a law career. but his love for sports won him over. After graduation in 1958, he started his teaching career in the town of Corozal. In the 1960s, he transferred to the town of Guaynabo and began teaching at Margarita Janer Palacios High School. He taught until 1973. During this time, he also coached the baseball teams of the towns of Fajardo, Humacao, Rio Piedras, and Guaynabo. In 1967, he was elected state president of the Association of Physical Education and Health teachers.

During an interview, Cruz told El Nuevo Dia reporter Pepo Garcia in 1983, "It was a hard job. Physical education teachers always have been subestimated. Tearing down walls was hard and going to the legislature looking for change did not accomplish anything. Teachers' status continues to be the same..."

Since childhood, Cruz was passionate about sports, particularly athleticism, volleyball, baseball and softball. His leader mentality moved him to favor coaching, instead of playing. In 1967, while still a teacher, he was elected President of the State Association of Physical Education Teachers. Later, he became one of Puerto Rico's most famous women's softball coaches. A year after putting together his first female softball team in 1973, he won a silver medal at the Central American Games in the Dominican Republic. Throughout his career as a coach, his softball team won five silver medals and one gold medal in international competitions, including the Panamerican Games, Central American Games. Cruz is the author of Softbol de Alto Nivel, a book about the fundamentals of strategy, exercises, and rules of the game of softball. He became president of the Puerto Rican Softball Federation during much of his period as mayor of Guaynabo. But, Cruz's love for sports touched more than buildings and parks. He was, perhaps, best known for his devotion to the game and its athletes. From cockfighting to volleyball, Cruz was a tireless promoter of Puerto Rican sports.

An achievement filled-life combined his love for sports with his desire to impulse Puerto Rico, and in particular, his town of Guaynabo, to economic development. It was not by choice, but to make a point, that Cruz decided to join the New Progressive Party (Partido Nuevo Progresista, in Spanish). In 1972, Cruz, then a physical education teacher, went to the Guaynabo City Hall to ask the town's mayor for a donation to buy running shoes for his track and field students who were competing in a regional event. The mayor denied the request and told him to let the students "continue to run barefoot". That disappointment led him to join politics as a way to make a change in sports. Cruz was often heard saying, "it was sports that led me to politics so I could help sports from a different platform."

Cruz was an advocate of statehood for the island. His first incursion into politics for the New Progressive Party as a member of Guaynabo's city council representing the Barrio Santa Rosa III in 1972. He later became president of the Guaynabo City Council from 1972-1976. In 1976, Cruz was elected to the House of Representatives for District 40; where he presided over the Commission for Sports and Recreation. In 1979, Cruz was elected as mayor of the City of Guaynabo, a position he held until his death in 1993. From that day on, he began the job of transforming the town into a city. An interesting fact is that in all the political elections in which Cruz participated, he received more votes than the candidates to Governor of Puerto Rico, regardless of the political party, and had support from constituents from all the political parties on the island. [El Nuevo Dia, Pepo Garcia 1993]. Cruz fought to increase the powers and autonomy of the island's mayors and joined the PDP-controlled Mayors Association to push for bipartisan municipal reforms.

During his tenure as mayor, the City of Guaynabo entered a period of economic progress, alongside other cities of Puerto Rico's so-called "metropolitan area", such as Bayamon. Like his colleague Ramon Luis Rivera, Cruz became endorsed by voters of Puerto Rico's three leading parties. As Mayor of Guaynabo, Cruz placed emphasis on the city's sports programs and elderly care, and, in 1983, the Mets Pavilion (named after the city's BSN basketball team; later renamed Mario Morales coliseum) opened. The new medical center, built at a cost of $24 million, opened its doors, along with parks for special needs children and recreational areas for families. Cruz secured federal funds to build new private and public housing developments to mitigate the need for housing in Guaynabo. Criminal delinquency during his tenure was among the lowest in Guaynabo's history, arguably, he said, because "I am attacking delinquency with sports." At the time of his leadership in 1984, there were 24 baseball parks in the town and 60 basketball courts. He allocated a budget of $300,000 for the development of parks and recreation in all the barrios in Guaynabo, and contracted coaches to teach the different skills to youth in low-income areas.

In 1989, Cruz became a founding member of a group aimed at uniting mayors of all parties in Puerto Rico, alongside Caguas mayor Angel O. Berrios, himself a member of the PPD party (PNP's main rival) and two other mayors.

Because of his work on behalf of health, the elderly, youth, and sports, in 1985 President Ronald Reagan awarded him the Private Sector Initiative Commendation in Recognition of Exemplary Community Service. At the time, only one other Puerto Rican had been the recipient of this honor, baseball star and humanitarian, Roberto Clemente. Although not ready to retire, at the time of his death, Cruz was already contemplating the idea of making room for younger leadership. "I am in politics for a short time and in sports for life," he said.

The day after his death, his photo appeared on the covers of all major newspapers in Puerto Rico, including El Nuevo Dia and El Vocero. and The San Juan Star. Former President George Bush and First Lady Barbara Bush extended condolences. U.S. Transportation Secretary Andrew Card said that Cruz was "not only committed to the people of Guaynabo but also more significantly, was deeply committed to Puerto Rico and its relationship with the United States." [The San Juan Star, Robert Friedman, March 19, 1993].

Alejandro Cruz was elected to the International Softball Federation Hall of Fame in 1993. He is one of ten Puerto Ricans, including Jorge Tanco, Juan Pachot and Ivelisse Echevarria, to be inducted at that sports museum. He also was honored after his death with the naming of a high school, Alejandro Junior Cruz High in Guaynabo. He is buried at Cementerio Nuevo Barrio Los Frailes in Guaynabo, Puerto Rico.

== See also ==
- List of Puerto Ricans

House of Representatives of Puerto Rico
Preceded by Ernesto Cabrera Alejandro	Member of the Puerto Rico House of Representatives from the 40th District; 1976-1980	Succeeded by Salomón Rondón Tollens
Political offices
Preceded by Ebenezer Rivera	Mayor of Guaynabo, Puerto Rico; 1980-1993	Succeeded by Héctor O'Neill
