= Guaynabo, Puerto Rico =

City and municipality in Puerto Rico

Guaynabo Municipio Autónomo de Guaynabo
- City and municipality
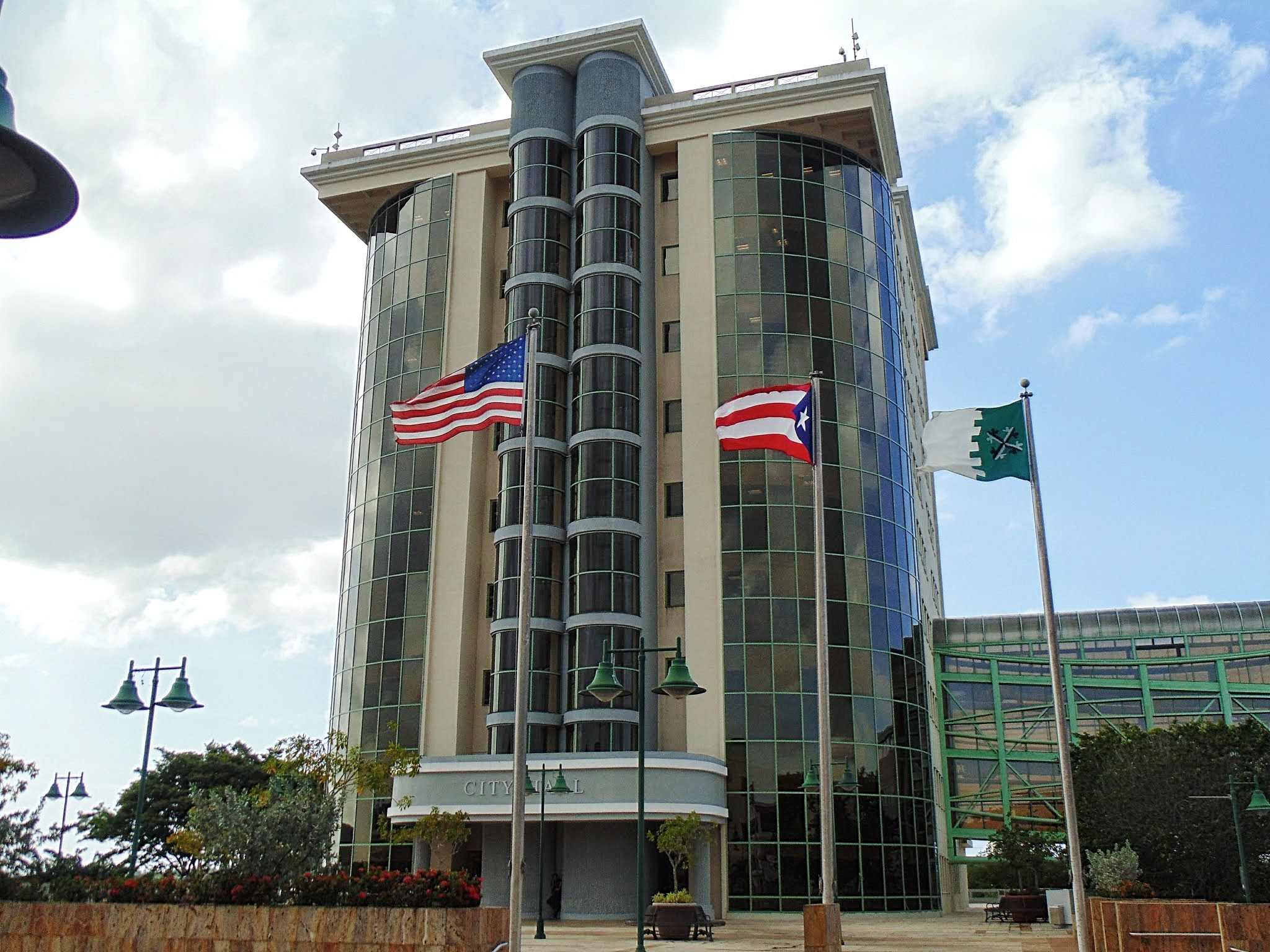
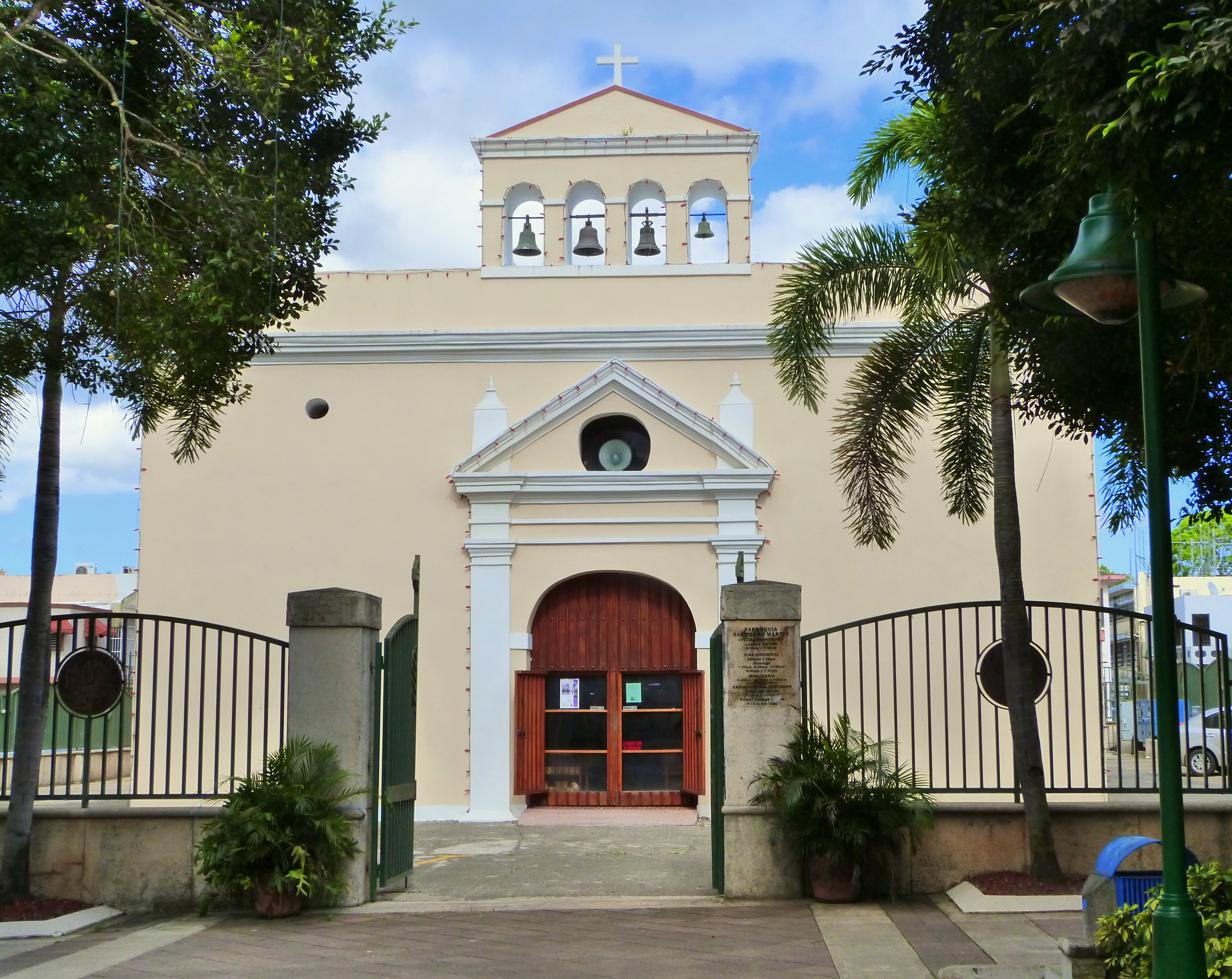
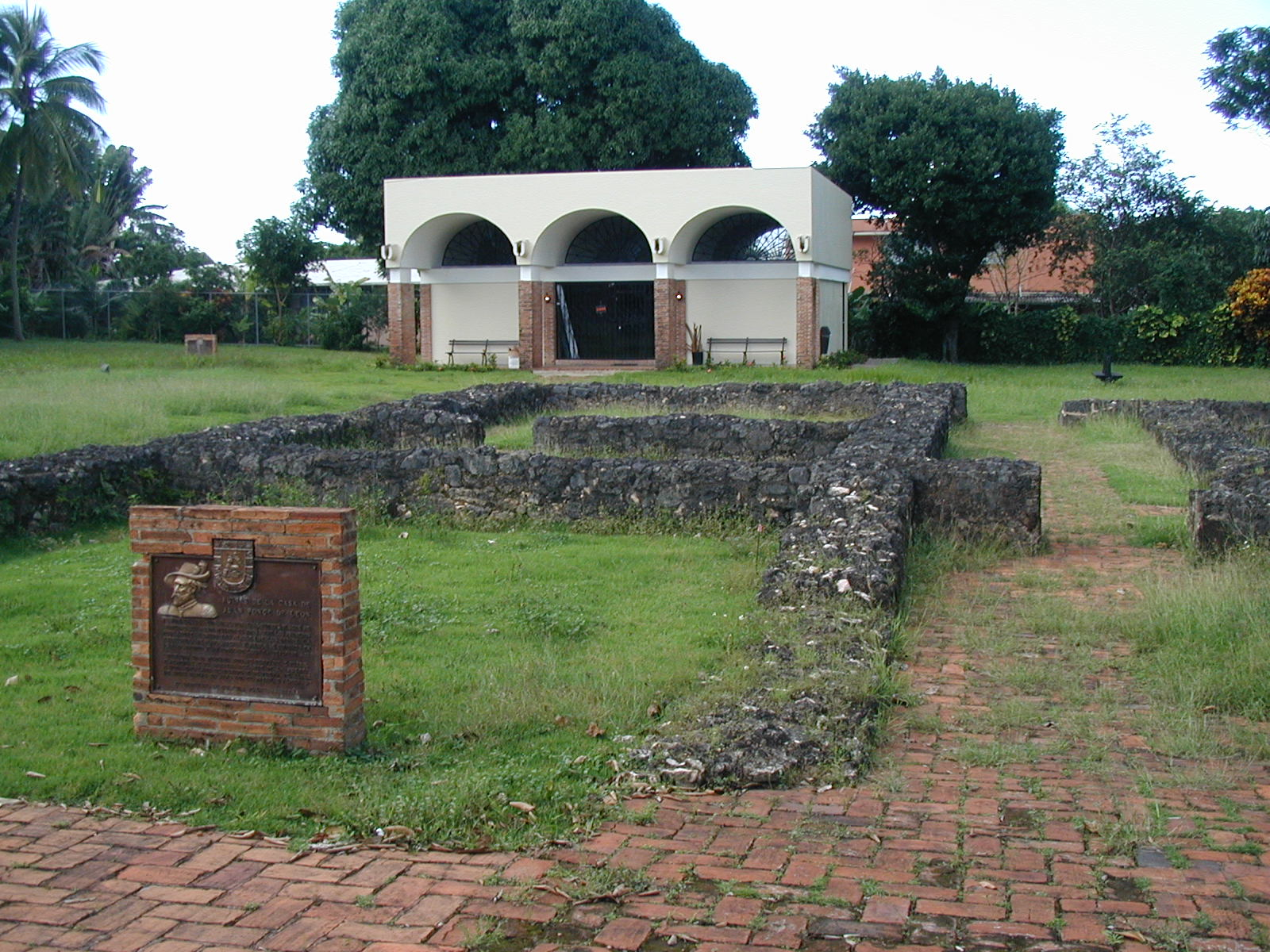
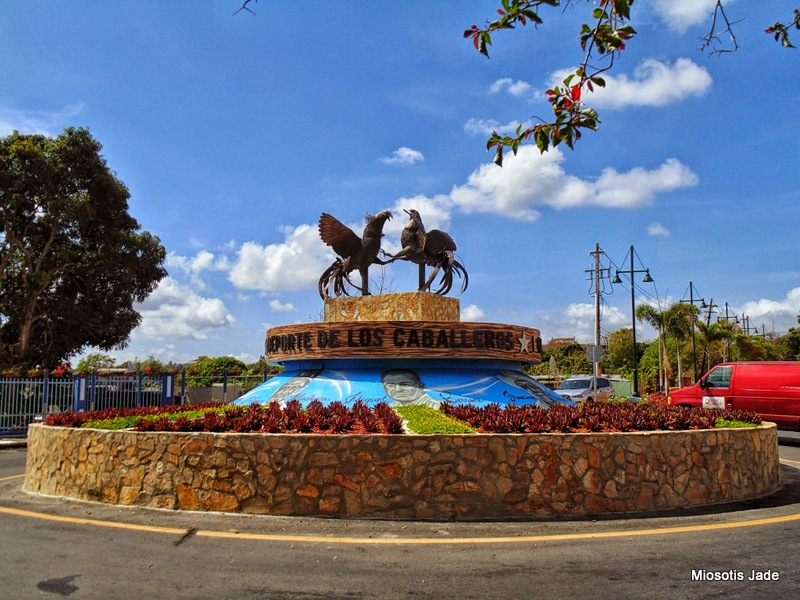
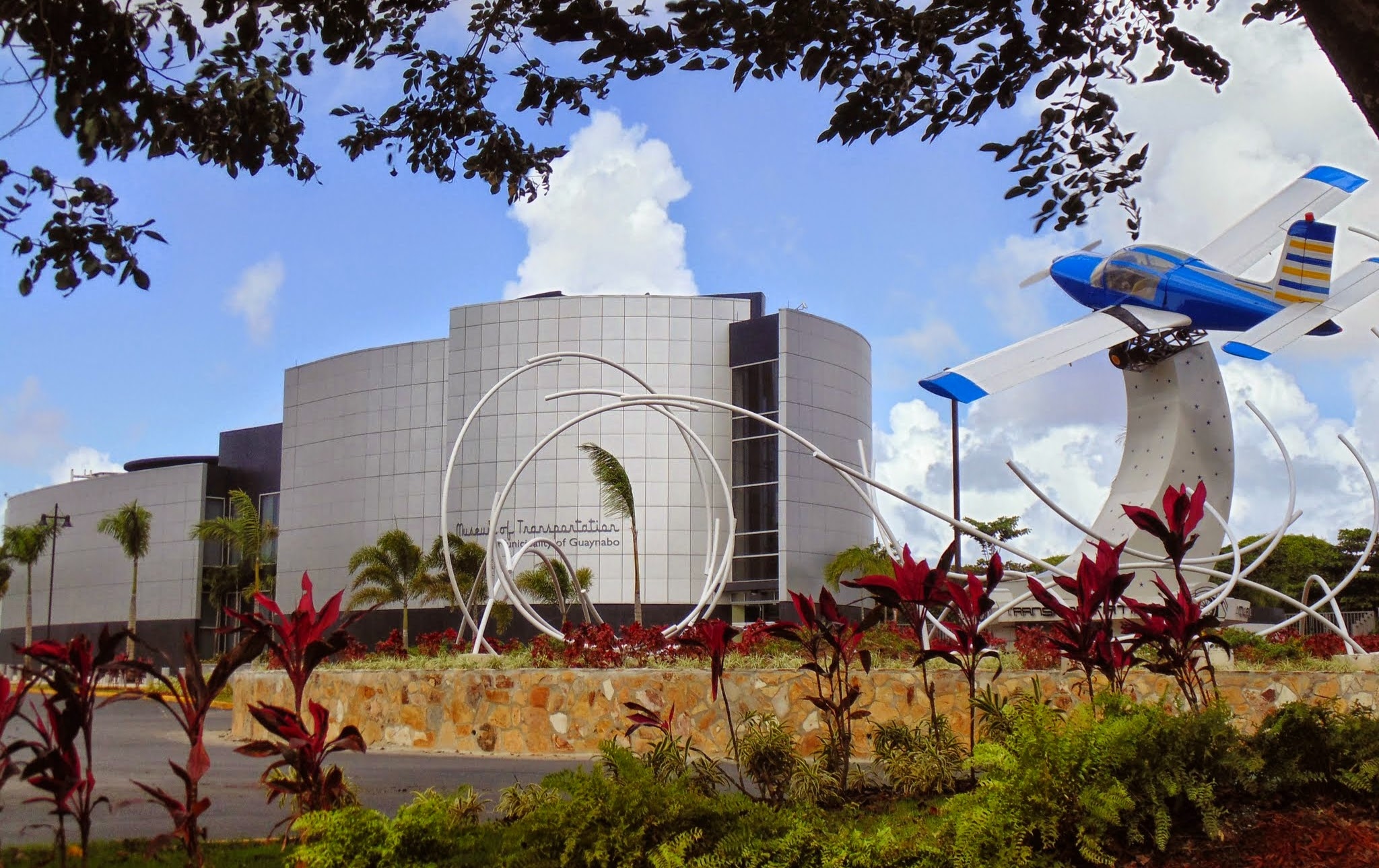
- Guaynabo skyline Guaynabo City Hall San Pedro de Mártir Church Caparra Archaeological Site Monument to cockfighting Transportation Museum

- Flag Coat of arms
- Nicknames: "Ciudad de los Conquistadores", "Pueblo del Carnaval Mabó", "Primer Poblado de Puerto Rico"
- Anthem: "Guaynabo, Pueblo Querido"
- Map of Puerto Rico highlighting Guaynabo Municipality
- Interactive map of Guaynabo
- Coordinates: 18°22′00″N 66°06′00″W
- Sovereign state: United States
- Commonwealth: Puerto Rico
- Settled: 1508
- Founded: April 9, 1769
- Founder: Pedro R. Dávila
- Barrios: 10 barrios: Camarones; Frailes; Guaynabo barrio-pueblo; Guaraguao; Hato Nuevo; Mamey; Pueblo Viejo; Río; Santa Rosa; Sonadora

Government
  - Mayor: Edward O'Neill Rosa (PNP)
  - Senatorial District: 1 - San Juan (Half); 2 - Bayamon (Half)
  - Representative dist.: 6 / 9

Area
  - Total: 27.1 sq mi (70.2 km^{2})

Population (2020)
  - Total: 89,780
  - Estimate (2025): 89,055 ▼
  - Rank: 6th in Puerto Rico
  - Density: 3,310/sq mi (1,280/km^{2})
- Demonym(s): Guaynabeño (masculine); Guaynabeña (feminine)
- Time zone: UTC−4 (AST)
- ZIP Codes: 00965, 00966, 00968, 00969, 00971, 00970
- Area code: 787/939
- Website: guaynabocity.gov.pr

Guaynabo (Spanish pronunciation: [ɡwajˈnaβo], locally [wajˈnaβo]) is a city and municipality on the northeastern coastal plain of Puerto Rico. Located west of the capital San Juan, east of Bayamón, south of Cataño and San Juan Bay, and north of Aguas Buenas, Guaynabo is spread over 9 barrios and the downtown area and administrative center of Guaynabo Pueblo. With a land area of 27.13 square miles (70.3 km^{2}) and a population of 89,780 as of the 2020 census, it is part of the San Juan metropolitan area. The studios of WAPA-TV, the most watched television station in Puerto Rico, are located in Guaynabo.

== History ==
The first European settlement in Puerto Rico, Caparra, was founded in 1508 by Juan Ponce de León in land that is today part of Guaynabo. Ponce de León resided there as first Spanish governor of Puerto Rico. This settlement was abandoned in 1521 in favor of San Juan. The ruins of Caparra remain and are a U.S. National Historic Landmark. The Museum of the Conquest and Colonization of Puerto Rico, which features artifacts from the site and others in Puerto Rico, is located on the grounds.

The municipality of Guaynabo was founded in 1769 by Pedro R. Dávila (P.R.), after a struggle for division from the municipality of Bayamón. Previously, the municipality was known as Buinabo, a name that it is popularly said to mean in Taíno "Here is another place of fresh water." Irish officer Thomas O'Daly and fellow Irishman Miguel Kirwan settled the area in the late 18th century and developed a farm and sugarcane plantation he named Hacienda San Patricio. The plantation no longer exists but the land on which it was located is now the central business district of Guaynabo and the San Patricio Plaza shopping mall.

On September 20, 2017 Hurricane Maria struck Puerto Rico. In Guaynabo, where 26.9% of the population live below the poverty level, 2800 homes were destroyed. The hurricane triggered numerous landslides in Guaynabo. Then president Donald Trump and his wife, Melania Trump visited Guaynabo. Due to the municipality's fiscal difficulties, it was not until April 2, 2019, over a year and half later, that the overtime pay owed to municipal workers was paid.

After 24 years as mayor, Héctor O'Neill García resigned in 2017 when allegations surfaced of sexual harassment toward a female municipal employee. He was replaced in a run-off election by Angel Pérez Otero, who in turn was forced out due to his arrest for Federal corruption allegations in 2021. Héctor O'Neill's son Edward O'Neill Rosa won the following run-off election to succeed him as mayor in January 2022.

== Geography ==
Cerro La Marquesa, the highest point in the municipality of Guaynabo.

The municipality of Guaynabo is located on the northern side of Puerto Rico. The relief of Guaynabo is flat in the north, accentuated by the karst hills (mogotes) of the Northern Karst Belt of Puerto Rico and hilly to the south. The highest point in Guaynabo in Cerro La Marquesa, which rises to 1,674.6 feet (510 m) and is located in the foothills of the Cordillera Central on the municipal boundary with Aguas Buenas.

=== Barrios ===
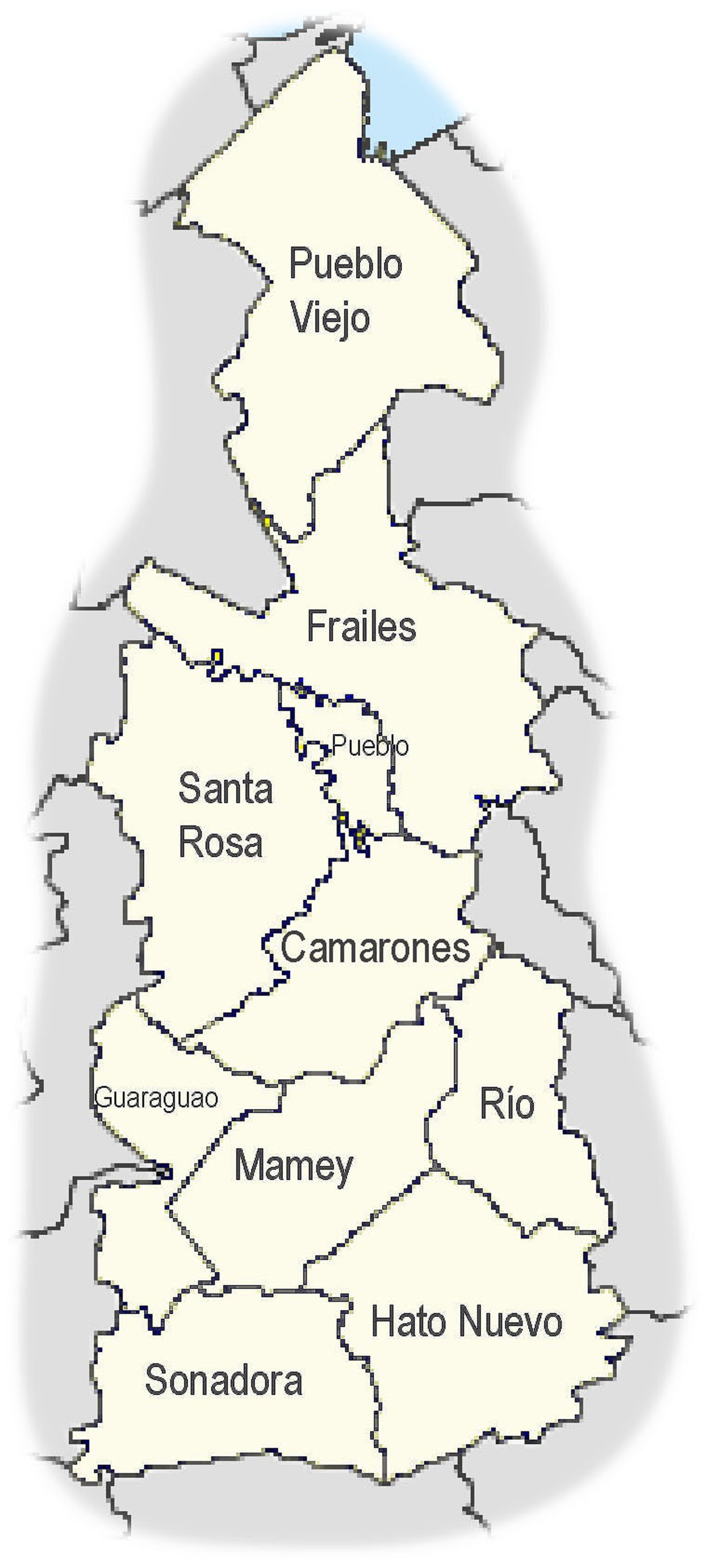
Barrios of Guaynabo, Puerto Rico locator map

Like all municipalities of Puerto Rico, Guaynabo is subdivided into barrios. The municipal buildings, central square and large Catholic church are located in a smaller barrio referred to as "el pueblo", located near the center of the municipality.

1. Camarones
2. Frailes
3. Guaraguao
4. Guaynabo barrio-pueblo
5. Hato Nuevo
6. Mamey
7. Pueblo Viejo
8. Río
9. Santa Rosa
10. Sonadora

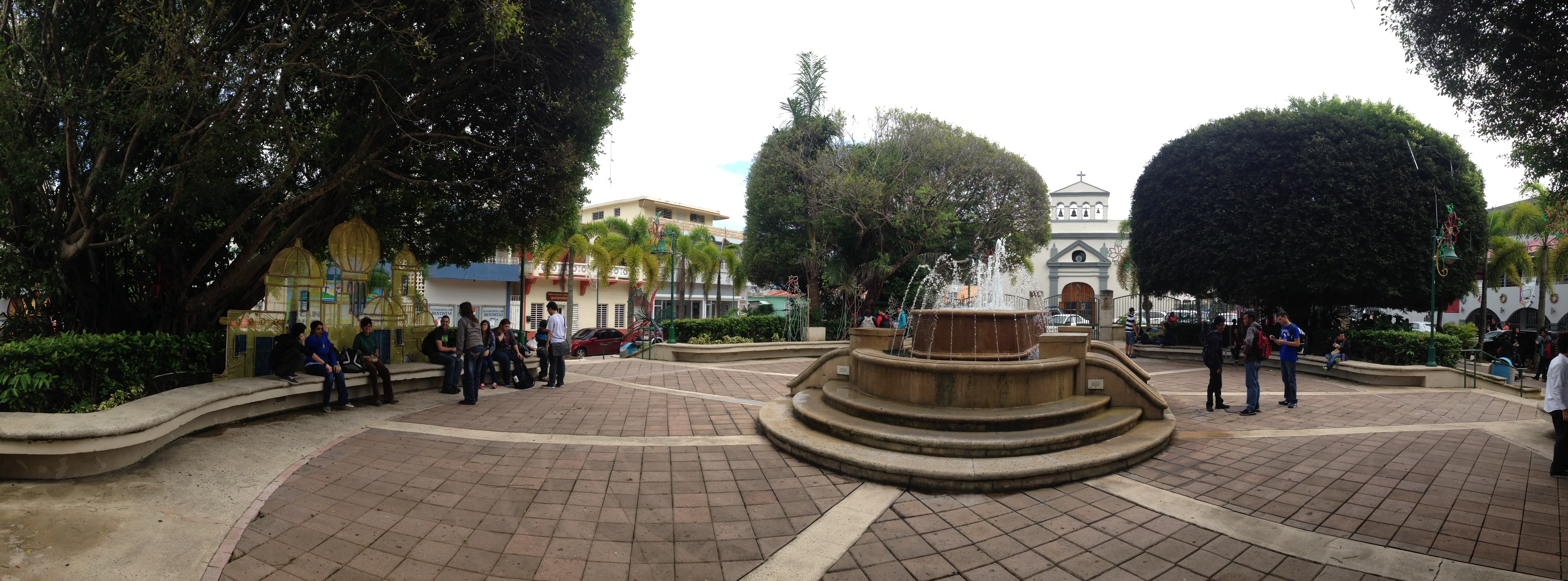
Guaynabo's town square in Guaynabo barrio-pueblo

=== Sectors ===
Barrios (which are, in contemporary times, roughly comparable to minor civil divisions) are further subdivided into smaller areas called sectores (sectors in English). The types of sectores may vary, from normally sector to urbanización to reparto to barriada to residencial, among others.

=== Special Communities ===
Comunidades Especiales de Puerto Rico (Special Communities of Puerto Rico) are marginalized communities whose citizens are experiencing a certain amount of social exclusion. A map shows these communities occur in nearly every municipality of the commonwealth. Of the 742 places that were on the list in 2014, the following barrios, communities, sectors, or neighborhoods were in Guaynabo: Amelia, Buen Samaritano, Camarones barrio, Corea, El Polvorín, Honduras, Jerusalén, Los Filtros, Sector El Laberinto, Sector La Pajilla, Sector Los Ratones (Camino Feliciano), Sector San Miguel, Trujillo, Sector Tomé, Vietnam, and Villa Isleña.

== Demographics ==
Historical population
Census	Pop.	Note	%±
1920	10,800		—
1930	13,502		25.0%
1940	18,319		35.7%
1950	29,120		59.0%
1960	39,718		36.4%
1970	67,042		68.8%
1980	80,742		20.4%
1990	92,886		15.0%
2000	100,053		7.7%
2010	97,924		−2.1%
2020	89,780		−8.3%
2025 (est.)	89,055	▼	−0.8%
U.S. Decennial Census; 1920-1930; 1930-1950 1960-2000 2010 2020

== Tourism ==
To stimulate local tourism, the Puerto Rico Tourism Company launched the Voy Turistiendo ("I'm Touring") campaign, with a passport book and website. The Guaynabo page lists Ruinas de Caparra, Paseo Tablado, and Plaza de Los Artistas, as places of interest.

=== Landmarks and places of interest ===
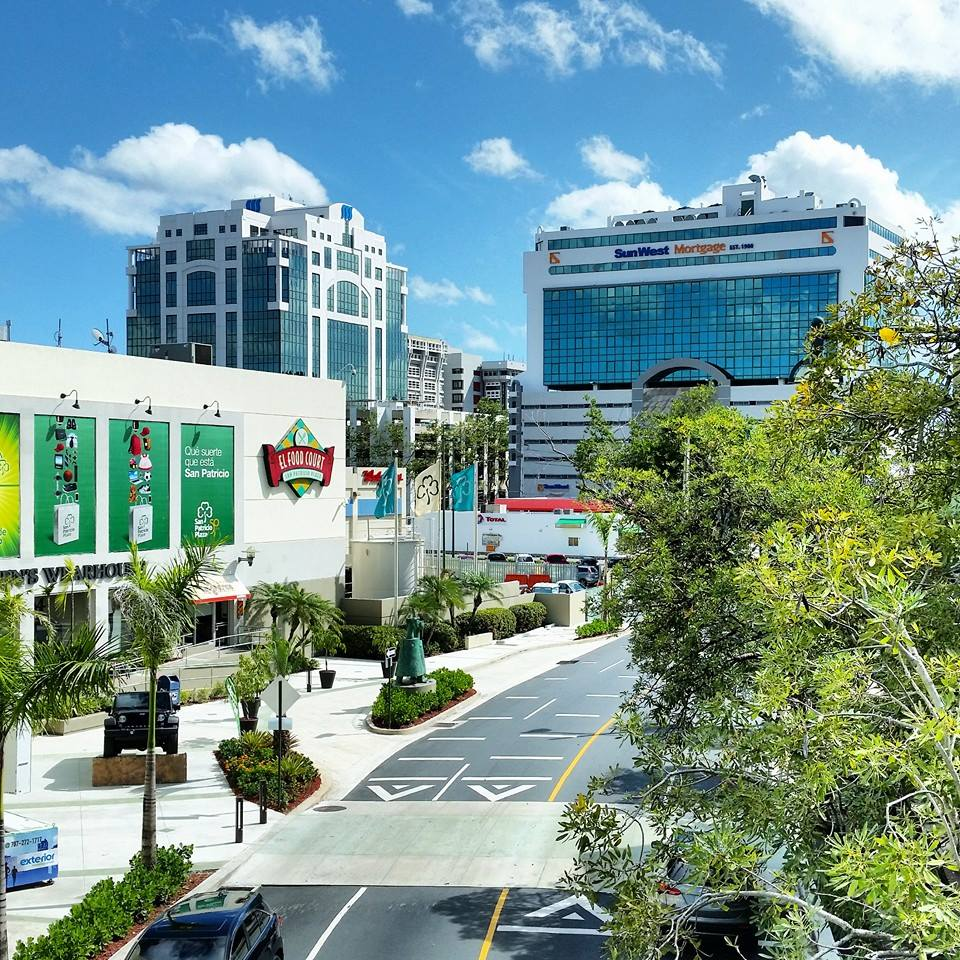
San Patricio Plaza shopping mall

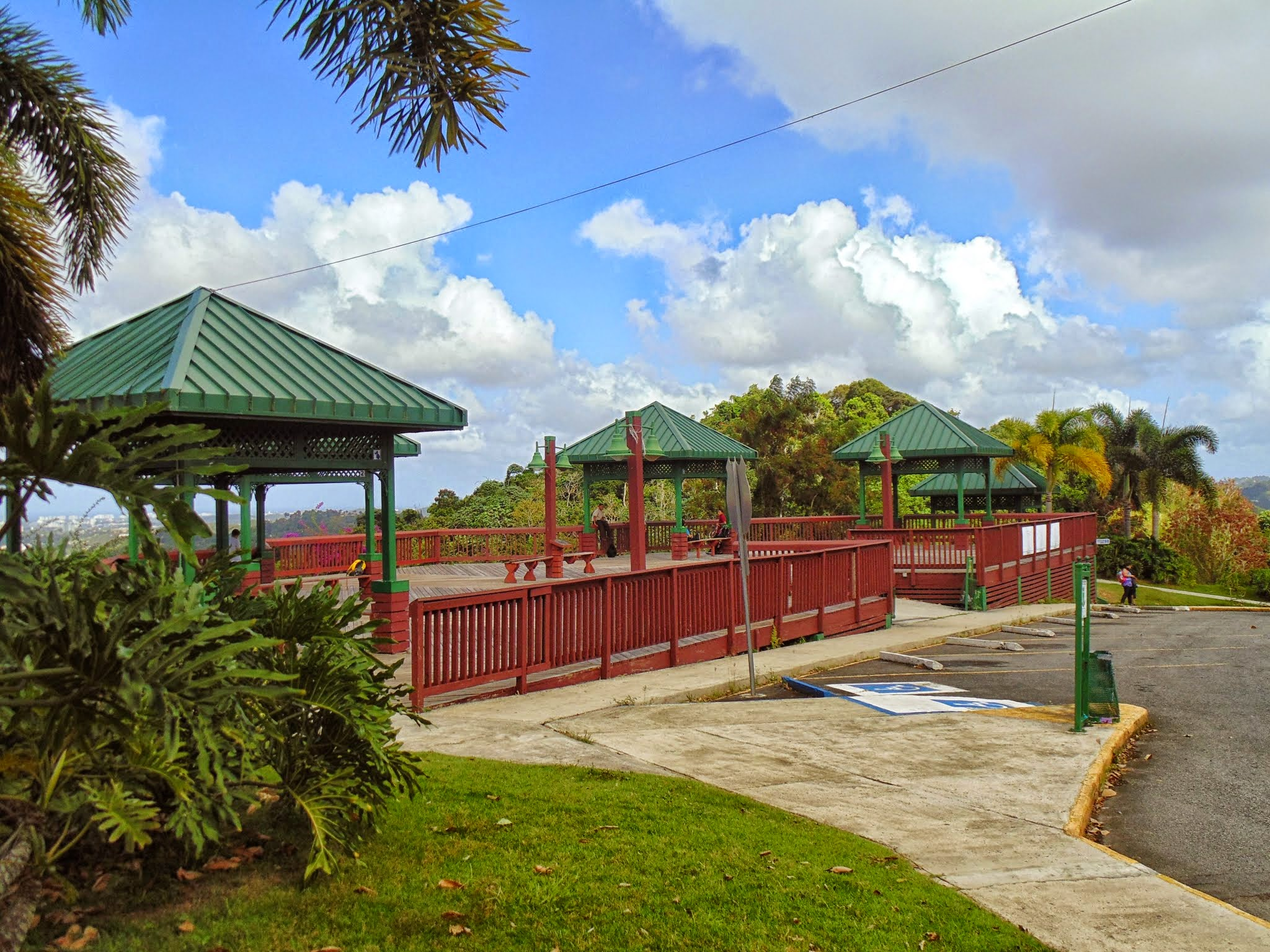
Scenic lookout at mirador Gavillan

- Rancho de Apa (restaurant)
- Centro de Bellas Artes (Guaynabo Performing Arts Center)
- Caparra Ruins
- Caribe Recreational Center
- Iglesia Parroquial de San Pedro Mártir
- La Marquesa Forest Park
- Paseo Tablado
- Mario Morales Coliseum
- San Patricio Plaza
- Caparra Country Club
- Plaza Guaynabo
- Museum of Transportation
- Museo del Deporte
- Fort Buchanan

== Economy ==
Several businesses have their headquarters or local Puerto Rican branches in Guaynabo. El Nuevo Día, Chrysler, Santander Securities, Puerto Rico Telephone, and many sales offices for large US and international firms (such as Total, Microsoft, Toshiba, Puma Energy and others) have their Puerto Rican headquarters in Guaynabo. WAPA-TV (Televicentro) and Univision Puerto Rico have their main studios in Guaynabo.

Iberia's San Juan-area offices are in Guaynabo.

== Crime ==
Carjackings have been an ongoing problem in Guaynabo, Puerto Rico and in 2023 the FBI indicted a group of criminals involved in carjackings.

== Climate ==
Climate data for Guaynabo, Puerto Rico
Month	Jan	Feb	Mar	Apr	May	Jun	Jul	Aug	Sep	Oct	Nov	Dec	Year
Record high °F (°C)	94 (34)	93 (34)	95 (35)	97 (36)	96 (36)	97 (36)	95 (35)	98 (37)	96 (36)	98 (37)	95 (35)	92 (33)	98 (37)
Mean daily maximum °F (°C)	84 (29)	85 (29)	86 (30)	87 (31)	88 (31)	90 (32)	90 (32)	90 (32)	90 (32)	89 (32)	87 (31)	85 (29)	90 (32)
Mean daily minimum °F (°C)	67 (19)	67 (19)	67 (19)	69 (21)	72 (22)	73 (23)	73 (23)	74 (23)	73 (23)	73 (23)	71 (22)	68 (20)	67 (19)
Record low °F (°C)	50 (10)	45 (7)	45 (7)	60 (16)	59 (15)	55 (13)	55 (13)	60 (16)	62 (17)	60 (16)	55 (13)	50 (10)	45 (7)
Average precipitation inches (mm)	4.79 (122)	3.30 (84)	3.52 (89)	5.80 (147)	7.17 (182)	4.54 (115)	6.70 (170)	6.44 (164)	7.39 (188)	6.79 (172)	8.06 (205)	6.39 (162)	70.89 (1,800)
Source: weather.com

== Culture ==
=== Festivals and events ===
Guaynabo celebrates its patron saint festival in April. The Fiestas Patronales de San Pedro Martir is a religious and cultural celebration that generally features parades, games, artisans, amusement rides, regional food, and live entertainment.

Other festivals and events celebrated in Guaynabo include:

- Three Kings Festival – January
- Mabó Carnival – February
- Mothers’ Day celebration – May
- National Salsa Day – June
- Fine Arts camp and recreation and sports camp – June
- Bomba and Plena (folkloric music and dance) Festival – October
- Official lighting of Christmas Lights – November

=== Sports ===
Guaynabo's old BSN team, the Guaynabo Mets, won national championships in 1980, 1982 and 1989, commanded by the player whom the Mario Morales Coliseum was named after, Mario "Quijote" Morales. The Conquistadores de Guaynabo, or Guaynabo Conquistadores, are the Guaynabo Mets replacement and still play in the Mario Morales Coliseum. The Mets de Guaynabo are the local women's volleyball team that play in the Liga de Voleibol Superior Femenino (LVSF), winning three titles in 1978, 1993–94 and 1995. They also play in the Mario Morales Coliseum. Guaynabo Fluminense FC is Guaynabo's professional soccer team that plays in the Puerto Rico Soccer League. The league started in 2008 and Guaynabo's current position in the league is 4th place. Guaynabo Fluminense FC play their matches at the Jose Bonano Stadium that was originally made for baseball, but became a soccer arena after the Puerto Rico Baseball League was cancelled for the 2008 season. It was at the same year that the Puerto Rico Soccer League was starting to take place. In the 2009 season, Guaynabo Fluminense FC moved to the Sixto Escobar Stadium.

- Mets de Guaynabo (women's volleyball) - Liga de Voleibol Superior Femenino (LVSF)
- Mets de Guaynabo (men's volleyball) - Liga de Voleibol Superior Masculino (LVSM)
- Guaynabo Conquistadores (basketball) - Baloncesto Superior Nacional (BSN)
- Mets de Guaynabo (basketball) - Baloncesto Superior Nacional (BSN)
- Mets de Guaynabo (baseball) - Federación de Béisbol Aficionado de Puerto Rico (Béisbol Doble A)
- Guaynabo Fluminense FC (soccer) - Puerto Rico Soccer League (PRSL)

== Government and infrastructure ==
The United States Postal Service operates two post offices, Guaynabo and Caparra Heights, in Guaynabo.

The Federal Bureau of Prisons operates the Metropolitan Detention Center, Guaynabo in Guaynabo.

Some regions of the city belong to the Puerto Rico Senatorial district I while others belong to the Puerto Rico Senatorial district II. Both of the Districts are represented by two Senators. In 2024, Nitza Morán and Juan Oscar Morales were elected as Senators for District I, while Migdalia Padilla and Carmelo Ríos have been serving as Senators for District II since being elected in 2004.

=== Mayors ===
==== Mayors of Guaynabo from 1969 to present ====
Mayor	Term	Party
Ebenezer Rivera	1969–1979	New Progressive Party
Alejandro Cruz Ortiz	1979–1993	New Progressive Party
Héctor O'Neill García	1993–2017	New Progressive Party
Angel Pérez Otero	2017–2021	New Progressive Party
Edward O'Neill Rosa	2022–Present	New Progressive Party

==== Mayors of Guaynabo from 1782 to 1969 ====
Term	Name
1782	Cayetano de la Sarna
1800	Pedro Dávila
1812	Dionisio Cátala
1816	Angel Umpierre
1818	Juan José González
1821	Joaquín Goyena
1822	José María Prosis
1823	Simón Hinonio
1825	José R. Ramírez
1827	Antonio Guzmán
1828	Genaro Oller
1836	Andrés Degal
1836	Agustín Rosario
1840	Francisco Hiques
1844	Martínez Díaz
1848	Tomás Cátla
1849	Andrés Vega
1852	Justo García
1856	José Tomás Sagarra
1857	Manuel Manzano
1859	Juan Floret
1859	José Francisco Chiques
1862	Segundo de Echeverte
1862	José de Murgas
1869	Juan J. Caro
1873	Benito Gómez
1874	Manuel Millones
1876	José Otero
1891	Juan Díaz de Barrio
1914	José Ramón
1914	José Carazo
1919	Narciso Vall-llobera Feliú
1924	Zenón Díaz Valcárcel
1936	Dolores Valdivieso
1944	Augosto Rivera
1948	Jorge Gavillán Fuentes
1956	Juan Román
1964	José Rosario Reyes

== Symbols ==
The municipio has an official flag and coat of arms.

=== Flag ===
This municipality has a flag.

=== Coat of arms ===
This municipality has a coat of arms.

== Health facilities ==
Professional Hospital Guaynabo located on Felisa Rincón Avenue (formerly Las Cumbres Avenue), is the newest hospital infrastructure built in Puerto Rico. Guaynabo is the only city in Puerto Rico to have a hospital specialized in advanced vascular surgery. Some of the first and newest procedures performed in Puerto Rico during 2009 were done in Professional Hospital Guaynabo, including the first AxiaLIF surgery for lumbar fusion.

== Transportation ==
The Tren Urbano has two stations in the municipality, Torrimar Station and the Martínez Nadal station. Guaynabo has a bus network called “Guaynabo City Transport”. There are 63 bridges in Guaynabo.

== Notable people ==
- Karla Aponte (born 1998), model and beauty pageant titleholder who was crowned Miss Earth Puerto Rico 2017
- Yolanda Arroyo Pizarro (born 1970), novelist
- Jorge Báez Pagán, educator and politician
- Román Baldorioty de Castro (1822–1889), abolitionist
- Lucas Rafael Bennazar Ortiz (born 1969), sports shooter
- Bárbara Bermudo (born 1975), journalist
- Marcos Berríos (born 1984), Air Force major and astronaut
- Iván Calderón (born 1975), professional boxer
- Victor Callejas (born 1960), professional boxer
- Josué Camacho (born 1969), professional boxer
- Fernando Canales (born 1959), freestyle swimmer
- April Carrión (born 1989), drag queen
- Vilmarie Castellvi (born 1981), professional tennis player
- Pablo Clemente-Colon, oceanographer
- Elvis Crespo (born 1971), merengue singer
- Alejandro Cruz (1938-1993), political leader and softball coach
- Iván DeJesús Jr. (born 1987), baseball player who played most for the Cincinnati Reds
- Francisco de León (born 1961), professional basketball player
- Alfredo Faget (1923–2003), professional basketball player
- Alberto Arturo Figueroa Morales (born 1961), Catholic prelate and bishop
- Walter Hodge (born 1986), professional basketball player
- Santiago Machuca (1929–2024), sports shooter
- Ramiro Martinez (1923–2015), sportscaster
- Carlos (born 1965), Oscar (born 1966), and Ricky Meléndez (born 1967), singers (Menudo)
- Catalina Morales (born 1990), actress and model who was crowned Miss Universe Puerto Rico 2015
- Juan Nazario (born 1963), professional boxer
- Tomas Nido (born 1994), baseball catcher for the New York Mets
- Benjamin Noriega-Ortiz (born 1956), interior designer
- Héctor O'Neill (born 1945), politician
- Juan O'Neill (born 1998), professional football player
- Angel Pérez Otero (born 1970), politician
- Silverio Pérez (born 1948), musician and writer
- José J. Reyes (born 1963), military commander
- Raúl Ríos (born 1993), sailor
- Cesar Rodriguez (born 1959), Air Force officer and pilot
- Roberto Rodríguez (born 1986), professional beach volleyball player
- David Sánchez (born 1968, jazz tenor saxophonist
- Christian Sobrino, attorney and public executive
- Félix Soto Toro (born 1967), electrical engineer
- Hiram Tua (born 1983), professional wrestler
- Gabriel Vicéns (born 1988), guitarist and composer

== Education ==
Guaynabo is home to Atlantic University, which specializes in new media art.

The Japanese Language School of Puerto Rico (プエルトリコ補習授業校 Puerutoriko Hoshū Jugyō Kō), a weekend Japanese school, previously held its classes in Guaynabo. It closed in March 2006.

== International relations ==
Guaynabo serves as a host city to four foreign consulates with business in Puerto Rico:

- El Salvador
- Finland
- Nicaragua
- Netherlands

== Gallery ==
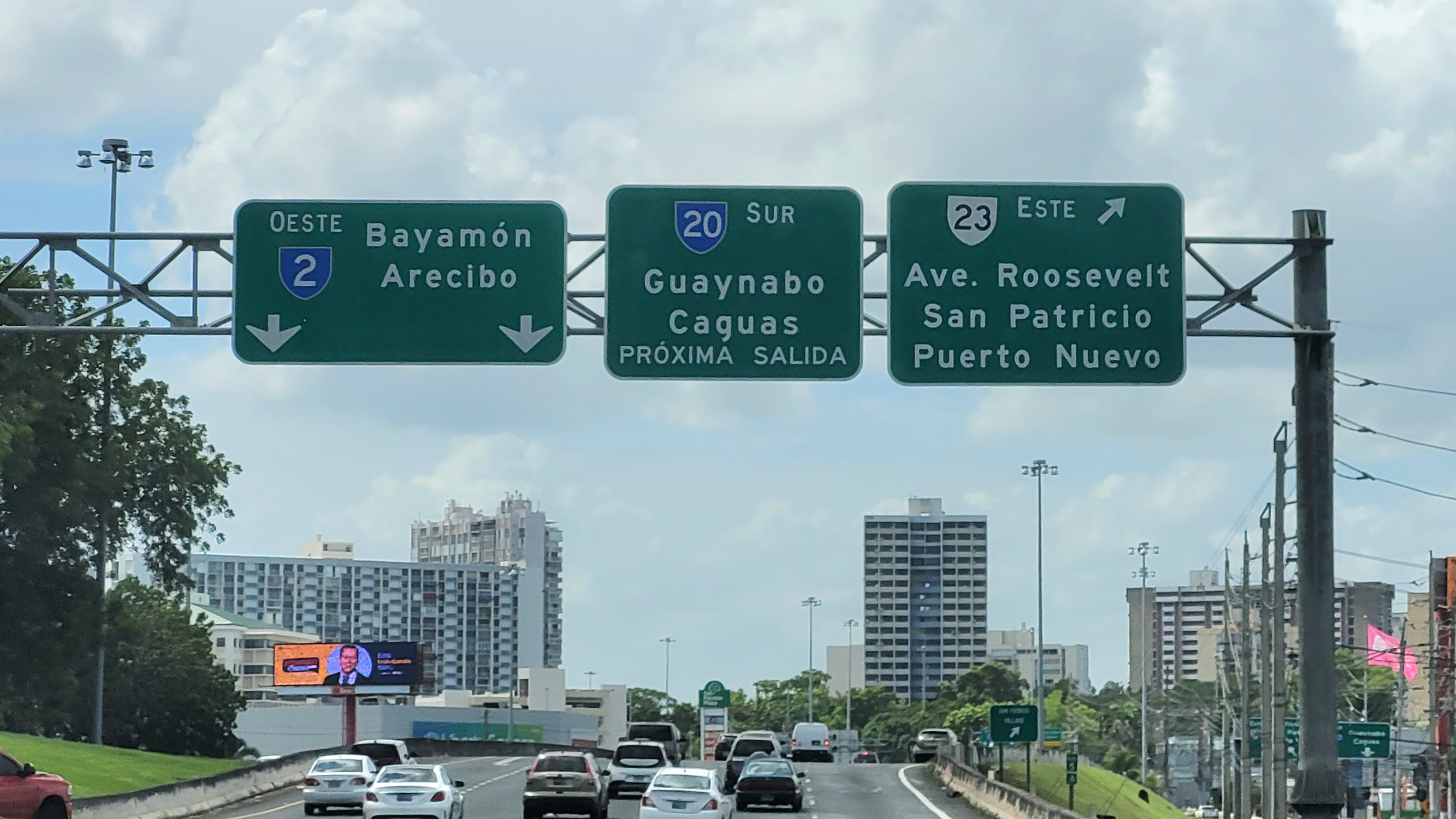
PR-2, PR-20, and PR-23 in Guaynabo

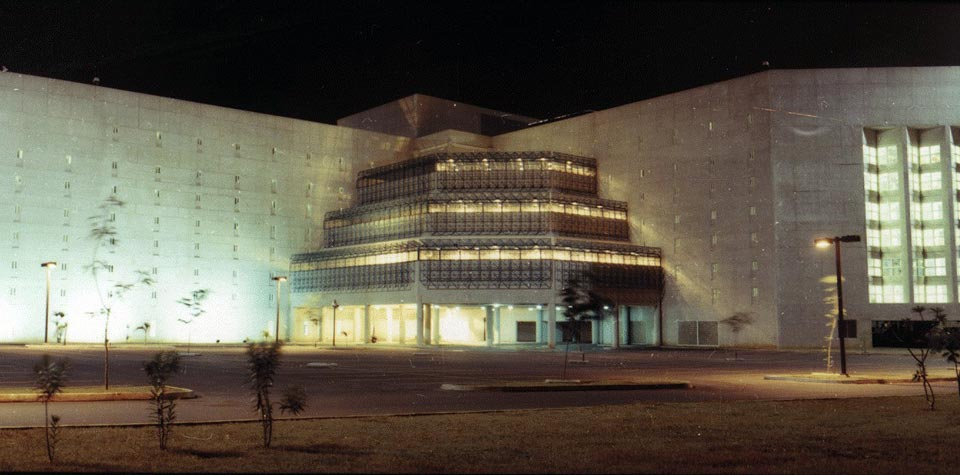
Metropolitan Detention Center in Guaynabo

== See also ==
- List of Puerto Ricans
- History of Puerto Rico
- Did you know-Puerto Rico?
