= Ivelisse Echevarría =

Puerto Rican softball player

- Born: November 4, 1956 (age 69); Peñuelas, Puerto Rico

Notes
- Echevarría was inducted into the International Softball Federation Hall of Fame

Ivelisse Echevarría (born November 4, 1956) was inducted into the International Softball Federation Hall of Fame in 2003 and is one of Puerto Rico's greatest softball pitchers.

== Early years ==
Echevarría was born and raised in the small town of Peñuelas, Puerto Rico. She became interested in sports during her primary and secondary educational years. She was an active participant in the sports of track and field during her high school years and established several school records. However, she did not know how to play and never participated in the game that in the future would gave her fame and glory in Puerto Rico, softball.

Echevarría received a scholarship from the Pontifical Catholic University of Puerto Rico, located in the neighboring city of Ponce and joined that institution's track and field team. She studied physical education and took a course on softball. Echevarría became interested in the game after learning its principles and decided to join a local softball club called Las Estrellas de Seboruco. According to an interview conducted by El Vocero on August 30, 2005, Echevarría did not even know how to put on a baseball glove when she joined. She was noticed by Carlin Velazquez, a former pitcher for the National Men's Softball Team of Puerto Rico, who recommended that she see Alejandro "Junior" Cruz, manager of the National Women's Softball Team of Puerto Rico and try out for the team. In 1978, Echevarría made the team and was trained by Donna Terry, a Puerto Rican softball pitcher.

== National Women's Softball Team of Puerto Rico ==
In 1979, Echevarría made her pitching debut in the Pan American Games celebrated in San Juan, Puerto Rico. In 1983, she participated in the Pan American Games held in Caracas, Venezuela and established a record by pitching in six consecutive games. She also pitched a perfect no runs and no hits game with 42 pitches on October 8. She pitched a shutout in the Games held in Indianapolis, Indiana in 1987 and she and her team won the silver medal. In 1993, Echevarría and her team won the gold medal in softball in the Centro American Games held in Ponce, Puerto Rico. She also played in the Games held in Mar del Plata, Argentina in 1995. Echevarría was the standard carrier for her team when they represented Puerto Rico in the 1996 Olympics held in Atlanta, United States.

== Puerto Rico Sports Hall of Fame ==
After the 1996 Olympics, Echevarría retired from the game after playing for 14 years.

In November 2003, Echevarría was inducted into the Puerto Rico Sports Hall of Fame and two weeks later the International Softball Federation Hall of Fame announced her election to the Hall. She was officially inducted on March 18, 2004 and the ceremony took place in Guaynabo's Sports Museum where an unveiling of a statue of Echevarría was part of the ceremony.

== See also ==
- List of Puerto Ricans
- Sports in Puerto Rico
- History of women in Puerto Rico
