= Federal Medical Center, Carswell =

Federal medical prison for women in Fort Worth, Texas

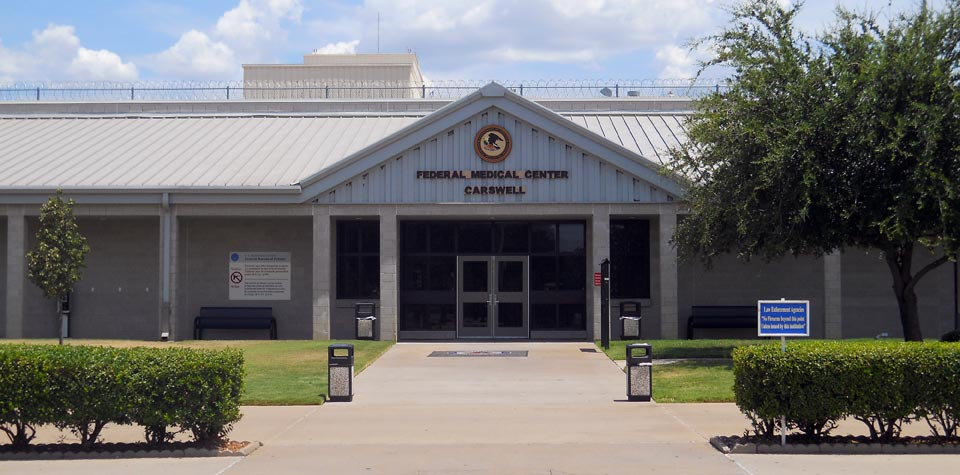
- Interactive map of Federal Medical Center, Carswell
- Location: Fort Worth, Texas; 32°47′06″N 97°25′03″W
- Status: Operational
- Managed by: Federal Bureau of Prisons
- Website: Official website

The Federal Medical Center, Carswell (FMC Carswell) is a United States federal prison and medical facility for women in Fort Worth, Texas. The Federal Bureau of Prisons (BOP) operates the administrative-security institution and its adjacent minimum-security satellite camp on the grounds of Naval Air Station Joint Reserve Base Fort Worth, formerly Carswell Air Force Base. Carswell is the only federal medical center operated specifically for women and houses prisoners with serious physical illnesses, disabilities, mental-health conditions and forensic-treatment needs. FMC Carswell held women's prisoners sentenced to death by the U.S. federal government.

== History ==
The main Carswell building was constructed as a 250-bed United States Air Force hospital and opened in 1958. The hospital cost approximately $5.2 million and was built to serve military personnel and their families.

The military hospital closed on September 30, 1993. The BOP acquired the property in 1994 and converted the six-story, approximately 360,000 square feet (33,000 m^{2}) hospital into a federal prison for women. The bureau later added nine buildings totaling approximately 717,185 square feet (66,628.7 m^{2}) and developed a 67 acres (27 ha) minimum-security camp next to the main institution.

Carswell opened in 1994 as the BOP's only medical center specifically for women.

== Facility and population ==
=== Physical layout and custody ===
The converted hospital contains 16 housing units with multiple-occupancy cells and one open-bay dormitory. The 2018 inspection found no general-population single-cell housing units. The complex includes chronic-care, medical-surgical, acute-care, mental-health and hospice units; an outpatient clinic; a special housing unit (SHU); and an administrative housing unit for women classified as requiring heightened security.

The administrative housing unit was activated in 1998 and contained 43 beds when inspected in 2017. It held women under federal death sentences, women accused of escape attempts or assaultive conduct, national-security prisoners and others designated as special management concerns.

The adjoining camp consists of two housing buildings and facilities for food service, healthcare, education, recreation, religious services, laundry, commissary and visitation. Women assigned to the camp also perform labor supporting the main institution and the surrounding naval air station.

=== Overcrowding and cell occupancy ===
The Corrections Information Council reported a design capacity of 926 people at the main institution and 314 at the camp. At the time of its September 2017 inspection, the main institution was already operating at 99 percent of design capacity. On August 1, 2026, BOP population statistics listed 1,014 people at the main institution and 249 at the camp. The main institution was therefore holding 88 people—approximately 9.5 percent—above its reported design capacity.

During the 2020 COVID-19 outbreak, the Fort Worth Star-Telegram, relying on interviews and more than 200 pages of written testimony from women in Unit 2 North, reported that cells in the institution's high-rise housing measuring approximately 7 feet (2.1 m) by 10 feet (3.0 m) were being used to hold four women each.

Conditions in the SHU reflected the same compression. Although BOP policy described SHU confinement as placement in two-person cells, inspectors observed two SHU areas in which most cells were designed to hold four people and the accessible cell was designed for three. Women in the SHU were generally allowed one hour per day outside their cells, and the inspection recommended doubling that minimum and restricting the use of disciplinary segregation.

=== Programs ===
Carswell offers adult basic education, GED instruction, English-language courses, continuing education, vocational training, religious services, recreation, release preparation and a Residential Drug Abuse Program. Vocational offerings have included cosmetology and culinary arts. The 2018 inspection found that post-GED and vocational opportunities were limited or unaffordable for some women and recommended expanding access.

== Sexual abuse and employee misconduct ==
Sexual contact between a BOP employee and a person under the employee's custodial authority is a federal crime; the law does not recognize the incarcerated person as capable of consenting to the relationship. Carswell nevertheless has one of the most extensively documented records of staff sexual abuse in the federal prison system.

=== Documented pattern ===
The 2022 bipartisan Senate investigation identified 22 women as victims in Carswell cases between 2012 and 2022. Its Carswell total combined victims in federal criminal cases with 16 women whose allegations were substantiated by the BOP Office of Internal Affairs. Carswell had more identified victims than any other federal women's prison in the Senate's exhibit.

A 2025 investigation by The Guardian found that 13 Carswell employees had been convicted of sexual abuse or related misconduct since 1997. The newspaper also reported that 35 women accused Carswell staff of sexual abuse or misconduct between 2014 and 2018, the highest reported number at any federal women's prison during that period.

The record includes correctional officers, supervisors, case managers, medical personnel, religious staff and other employees. Federal prosecutions have included former cook supervisor Yvonne Marrufo, who pleaded guilty in 2016 to sexually abusing a woman she supervised; former case manager Matthew McGaugh, sentenced in 2017 after pleading guilty to sexual abuse; former lieutenant Luis Curiel, sentenced in 2022 for sexually abusing women under his authority; and former correctional officer Marerllis Nix, sentenced in 2025 after a trial established that he committed sexual acts with a woman in his custody.

The recurring convictions and substantiated cases established that the abuse was not confined to unverified complaints or a single employee. A former acting director of the BOP's National Institute of Corrections, who participated in a 2022–2023 audit of Carswell, told The Guardian that the prison had a pattern of sexual assault and that senior Carswell and regional officials received the audit. She said no major institutional change followed.

=== Reporting failures and retaliation ===
Women interviewed by The Guardian described rape, coerced sexual acts, threats and retaliation by employees who controlled their housing, work assignments, medical access and disciplinary status. Several said that administrators ignored reports, delayed interviews or returned accused employees to duty.

In 2025, 11 women filed civil lawsuits alleging sexual abuse by six Carswell employees, including correctional, medical, religious and maintenance personnel. Several plaintiffs alleged that they were punished, transferred or placed in the SHU after reporting abuse. At the time of the investigation, the government had sought to move the cases to the Northern District of Texas but had not addressed the merits of the allegations.

Internal-affairs records obtained by The Guardian showed that sexual-misconduct allegations at Carswell rarely produced discipline. Four of seven "inappropriate relationship" allegations reviewed for a 26-month period were substantiated; one employee was prosecuted, while three others resigned or retired and the investigations were closed. The paper also cited a Justice Department inspector-general finding that BOP investigators required substantially more proof than agency policy demanded, increasing the likelihood that employees who committed misconduct could avoid accountability and remain employed.

The BOP told The Guardian that it takes sexual-abuse allegations seriously and investigates credible reports. It declined to answer detailed questions about the Carswell cases, the status of accused employees and the internal audit.

=== PREA audit and continuing allegations ===
A Prison Rape Elimination Act audit conducted in July 2025 declared Carswell compliant with all 45 standards reviewed. The same audit recorded four allegations of staff-on-inmate sexual abuse and 15 allegations of staff-on-inmate sexual harassment during the preceding 12 months. None of the abuse allegations had been referred for criminal investigation; three remained open and one was classified as unsubstantiated. Twelve harassment investigations remained open, and one staff-harassment allegation had been substantiated.

The compliance finding therefore coexisted with active allegations, unresolved investigations and a documented institutional history of convictions. The Senate had already found that PREA audits at other federal women's prisons declared facilities compliant while failing to detect ongoing cultures of employee sexual abuse, and concluded that the BOP had not successfully implemented PREA as a prevention and accountability system.

== External oversight and accountability ==
Carswell's failures persisted within an oversight structure that repeatedly failed to provide effective independent review. Healthcare accreditation ended, correctional reaccreditation relied on the BOP's own findings, a requested congressional inquiry never occurred, and an internal audit warning of a sexual-assault pattern produced no visible major reform.

=== Loss of independent healthcare accreditation ===
Carswell's contract with The Joint Commission, which accredited the prison as a healthcare organization, expired in October 2020 and was not renewed. By 2025, no comparable independent healthcare accreditation had replaced it. The State of Texas did not regulate the prison's medical operations because Carswell is a federal institution, and no outside organization independently monitored dialysis treatments.

Carswell's medical-services contract required quarterly reports describing problems in the dialysis program. The University of North Texas Health Science Center told reporters that it did not possess the reports and directed questions to its subcontractor, U.S. Renal Care. Neither the contractor nor the BOP produced the requested monitoring records.

The result was a specialized dialysis program for medically vulnerable women with no publicly documented review by a hospital accreditor, state health regulator or independent clinical monitor.

=== Correctional accreditation without independent review ===
The BOP separately paid the American Correctional Association (ACA) to accredit federal prisons. BOP officials described the contract as a source of independent third-party review. A 2023 audit by the Department of Justice inspector general found that such independent review did not occur during most reaccreditations.

ACA reviewers relied on the BOP's internal program reviews instead of conducting their own comprehensive examinations of prison operations and records. The inspector general found that ACA did not consistently verify the bureau's work, did not always report deficiencies and corrective actions, and sometimes used fewer reviewers or less inspection time than required.

The inspector general concluded that the BOP was, in effect, paying ACA to affirm the bureau's own findings. It found no instance in which ACA accreditation improved BOP health, safety or security standards and warned that the process created a public misconception that federal prisons had undergone ACA's ordinary independent review.

The BOP allowed its ACA contract to expire on March 31, 2024. The end of the contract removed an accreditation process that the inspector general had found non-independent, but it did not itself create a replacement system of routine outside review.

=== Warnings that produced little change ===
In September 2022, Representative Marc Veasey asked the House Judiciary Committee to investigate Carswell's high number of sexual-abuse reports and the BOP's handling of complaints. His request cited a pattern of misconduct and alleged cover-ups revealed by the Star-Telegram. The Guardian reported three years later that the requested inquiry never occurred.

The 2022–2023 National Institute of Corrections audit separately warned Carswell and BOP regional leadership that the institution had a pattern of sexual assault. According to a former acting director who participated in the review, no major publicly visible institutional change followed.

Congress enacted the Federal Prison Oversight Act in 2024, requiring risk-based inspections of BOP institutions by the Justice Department inspector general and establishing an independent ombudsman to receive complaints concerning health, safety, welfare and civil rights. The law was a response to systemic failures across the federal prison system; it did not erase Carswell's prior decades without sustained independent clinical or correctional monitoring.

== Medical and mental-health care ==
Carswell is classified as a Care Level 3 and 4 institution for women with serious and complex medical and mental-health needs. Its defining institutional obligation is therefore not merely custody but the delivery of competent medical care. Inspection findings and investigative reporting show repeated failures in that core function.

=== Staffing and delayed treatment ===
The 2018 inspection found 21 vacant positions across health services, including six clinical-nurse positions and three nurse-practitioner positions. Outside nursing and support staff, Carswell reported one full-time gynecologist, one nurse practitioner and one medical director.

Among the 12 District of Columbia women who answered questions about waiting times, 58 percent were "very unsatisfied" with medical waits and 50 percent were "very unsatisfied" with mental-health waits. One-third said sick-call requests were rarely answered within 48 hours. Although the survey covered a small group and did not measure the entire prison population, inspectors also reviewed records and directly observed women whose conditions had deteriorated while treatment was delayed.

One woman with multiple sclerosis told inspectors that she had been able to walk when she arrived at Carswell but received no medication for nine months. Inspectors found her in a wheelchair, unable to walk, with delayed movement and twitching; another incarcerated woman had to push her wheelchair to the interview. Other women reported waiting more than a year for fibroid surgery, receiving no response to repeated sick-call requests, and experiencing delays after reporting seizures and severe pain.

The inspection also found substantial dissatisfaction with mental-health treatment. A woman classified as Mental Health Care Level 3 reported that she repeatedly requested psychiatric help while in the SHU and received no assistance until she overdosed on pills.

=== Dialysis care ===
Carswell is the only federal women's prison offering inpatient dialysis. The BOP contracts with the University of North Texas Health Science Center for much of the institution's medical care; the Health Science Center subcontracts dialysis services to U.S. Renal Care, while the BOP remains responsible for dialysis equipment.

A joint 2025 investigation by The Marshall Project and the Fort Worth Star-Telegram reviewed medical records, court filings and interviews with current and former Carswell patients. Women described treatments cut short or missed, severe recurring cramps, broken machine parts, discolored tubing, incorrect machine settings, inadequate clean water and little education about renal diets and infection prevention.

Medical experts who reviewed the accounts said the reported conditions exposed patients to serious and preventable harm. A nephrologist said that persistent severe cramps indicated that treatments were not being properly adjusted and that patients should be evaluated more frequently than the monthly specialist access described in Carswell's contract.

BOP mortality reviews showed that at least three women receiving dialysis at Carswell died between 2015 and April 2020 and that all three developed sepsis before death. The BOP denied that dialysis care was inadequate and said Carswell provided appropriate staffing, treatment and patient education. It also said it had received no reports or claims concerning dialysis quality, despite the court filings and complaints reviewed by reporters.

=== Deaths and reported medical neglect ===
The BOP reported 12 deaths at Carswell between September 2016 and August 2017 and classified all of them as natural deaths. Earlier and later deaths repeatedly generated allegations that treatable conditions were ignored or allowed to deteriorate.

In January 2012, Loukeithia "Kikki" Felts died in Carswell's SHU at age 38. Fort Worth Weekly reported that she had severe chronic illnesses and extensive burn injuries and had repeatedly complained of declining health. An outside ophthalmologist had recommended urgent surgery, but Felts remained on a waiting list when she died. Her death certificate listed pulmonary edema, pulmonary thromboembolism and chronic obstructive pulmonary disease. Carswell officials did not answer the newspaper's questions about her care.

A 2005 Fort Worth Weekly investigation, later republished by the ACLU of Texas, examined the death of Linda D'Antuono Fenton. She was found unconscious in a high-security cell two days before her scheduled release and died eight days later. The Tarrant County medical examiner ruled the death a suicide by hanging; a pathologist retained by her family disputed that conclusion and said her injuries were more consistent with a choke hold. The investigation also described other deaths and near-fatal episodes in which women or their families accused Carswell staff of ignoring urgent medical symptoms. The BOP said that Carswell followed its suicide-prevention policy and provided care comparable to community standards.

The persistence of similar allegations across decades—delayed surgery, unanswered pleas, cardiac emergencies, dialysis failures and deaths after medical deterioration—has made Carswell's medical mission the central subject of repeated investigations rather than a routine description of services.

== Conditions of confinement ==
=== Food, hygiene and daily living ===
The 2018 inspection found that women reported receiving inadequate food and being frequently hungry. The council recommended that Carswell review whether its meal portions were sufficient.

Carswell issued women three pairs of underwear every six months. Half of the surveyed District residents said they did not receive enough pads, tampons or liners, and seven said they had to purchase menstrual products to maintain basic hygiene. Some reported receiving no free products despite a BOP policy requiring them.

The same inspection found that 9 of 12 women who answered safety questions reported being harassed, threatened or abused by staff; eight reported being insulted. Six said they reported the conduct, and four of those six were dissatisfied with the institutional response. The sample was limited to District of Columbia residents, but its findings were consistent with later reporting about retaliation and the institutional handling of staff misconduct.

=== Grievance process ===
The BOP requires incarcerated people to exhaust its administrative-remedy process before they can pursue many claims in federal court. At Carswell, the 2018 inspection found that medical and staff complaints were routinely rejected and almost never granted. Of 93 medical grievances submitted at the institution level during the reporting period, 38 were rejected and none was granted. Of 52 staff complaints, 20 were rejected and one was granted.

None of the surveyed women described any level of the grievance process as fair. They cited unavailable forms, missing responses, fear of retaliation, bias and the belief that filing complaints only created further problems. The structure required women to seek redress through the same institution whose employees controlled the forms, records and initial decisions.

=== Restrictive housing ===
The SHU held women in disciplinary segregation, administrative detention and protective custody. Inspectors reported an average stay of 30 days and found women generally confined to cells for 23 hours per day.

Women in the SHU lost access to ordinary programming and faced restrictions on telephone calls, email, commissary and visitation. Inspectors documented complaints that investigations and disciplinary hearings were delayed, that staff presumed women guilty and that medical and mental-health rounds were inconsistent.

== COVID-19 pandemic ==
Carswell's overcrowding and medical population made the institution especially vulnerable during the COVID-19 pandemic. In April 2020, Andrea Circle Bear underwent an emergency Caesarean delivery while hospitalized and died from COVID-19 on April 28, becoming the first woman in BOP custody reported to have died from the disease.

By July 21, 2020, Carswell had reported 510 confirmed cases. By late August, six women had died from COVID-19-related causes, according to the Star-Telegram. Women described four-person cells, an inability to physically distance, prolonged lockdowns and the movement of women who had tested negative into units containing positive cases.

During the lockdown, women reported going three weeks without access to the commissary for soap, aspirin and menstrual products. They said the prison distributed one sack of food per day for 19 days instead of regular hot meals and provided spoiled or inadequate food.

Seventy-three women joined a proposed class-action filing alleging unsafe conditions and inadequate medical care. A federal judge required the women to file individual cases rather than allowing the action to proceed in the proposed form. The BOP said Carswell followed federal public-health guidance, isolated positive cases and transferred women needing acute care to hospitals or prison medical units.

The outbreak exposed the combined consequences of Carswell's design and management: medically vulnerable women were confined in crowded cells inside a facility already operating beyond its reported capacity, while access to food, hygiene products, medical treatment and outside review remained controlled by the same institution.

== Notable inmates (current and former) ==
=== Former death row ===
Inmate Name	Register Number	Photograph	Status	Details
Angela Johnson	08337-029		Transferred to FCI Tallahassee. Serving a life sentence. Originally sentenced to death on December 19, 2005; commuted in December 2014.	Convicted in 2005 for her role in aiding her then-boyfriend, Dustin Honken, commit four drug-related homicides. Honken was also sentenced to death, and was executed on July 17, 2020.
Lisa Marie Montgomery	11072-031		Executed on January 13, 2021, at USP Terre Haute.	Convicted in 2007 of murdering Bobbie Jo Stinnett, aged 23, and kidnapping her unborn baby from her womb in 2004. Montgomery was transferred to USP Terre Haute and was originally scheduled to be executed via lethal injection on December 8, 2020. She was ultimately executed on January 13, 2021.

=== Non-death row ===
==== High-profile inmates ====
Inmate Name	Register Number	Photo	Status	Details
Lynne Stewart	53504-054		Released on compassionate grounds in December 2013 due to terminal cancer. She died on March 7, 2017.	Disbarred civil rights attorney; convicted in 2005 of providing material support to a terrorist conspiracy for assisting her incarcerated client, Omar Abdel Rahman, to communicate with his followers in violation of Special Administrative Measures prohibiting it.
Wanda Barzee	16650-081		Served a 15-year sentence; released in April 2018.	Pleaded guilty to kidnapping and unlawful transportation of a minor in connection with the abduction of Elizabeth Smart; Barzee's then-husband, Bryan David Mitchell, was sentenced to life.
Lynette Fromme	06075-180		Released from custody in 2009 after serving 34 years.	Follower of incarcerated cult leader Charles Manson; convicted in 1975 of attempting to assassinate US President Gerald Ford in Sacramento, California, on September 5, 1975.
Marion Jones	84868-054		Released from custody in 2008 after serving 5 months.	Member of the US Olympic Track and Field Team during the 2000 Summer Olympics; pleaded guilty in 2007 to lying to federal investigators about her use of performance-enhancing drugs during athletic events.
Áurea Vázquez-Rijos	46255-069		Serving life sentences.	Sisters convicted in 2018 for murdering Aurea's estranged husband Adam Joel Anhang Uster in 2005.
Marcia Vázquez-Rijos	42102-069		Serving life sentences.	Sisters convicted in 2018 for murdering Aurea's estranged husband Adam Joel Anhang Uster in 2005.
Reality Winner	22056-021	Reality Winner 2015	Transferred as part of plea deal to treat bulimia. Released on June 2, 2021, and again on November 23, 2021.	Sentenced on August 23, 2018, to five years and three months in prison for releasing one Top Secret document exposing Russian attempted interference in the US 2016 Presidential election, thereby violating the Espionage Act.
Rita Gluzman	82050–054		Released on compassionate release in July 2020 due to several medical issues including multiple strokes and a diagnosis of early Parkinson's disease.	On April 30, 1997, Gluzman was sentenced to life in prison after being convicted on a federal charge of interstate domestic violence for killing her husband. After her sentencing, Gluzman appealed her sentence, claiming her conviction was unconstitutional. Her appeal was denied.

==== Other notable inmates ====
Inmate Name	Register Number	Photo	Status	Details
Shannon Richardson	21213–078		Serving an 18-year sentence; scheduled for release on December 29, 2028.	Former actress who pleaded guilty to sending letters containing ricin to President of the United States Barack Obama and Mayor of New York City Michael Bloomberg in 2013. As part of her plea deal, she was ultimately convicted of "possessing and producing a biological toxin" and was sentenced to 18 years in prison and a $367,000 fine. Richardson had sent the letters in an attempt to frame her estranged husband. Before her conviction Richardson was a small-part actress who appeared in the television shows The Vampire Diaries and The Walking Dead. She is also a mother of six children. On March 16, 2015, the Investigation Discovery channel aired episode 10 of season 6 of the television show Who the (Bleep) Did I Marry? which featured Shannon Richardson's case as told by her ex-husband. The episode was titled "Poison Love".
Emma Coronel Aispuro	31149–509		Served a three-year sentence, released on September 13, 2023, to four years of supervised release.	Wife of El Chapo; charged with importing drugs into the US.
Kristen Gilbert	90371-038		Serving a life sentence.	Former nurse at the Veterans Affairs Medical Center in Massachusetts; convicted of murder in 2001 for deliberately injecting four patients with fatal doses of the heart stimulant epinephrine in 1995 and 1996.
Ana Montes	25037-016		Served a 25-year sentence; released on January 6, 2023.	Former senior analyst for the Defense Intelligence Agency; pleaded guilty to espionage in 2002 for passing classified information to Cuban intelligence over a 16-year period, including the identities of four US spies.
Marius Mason	04672-061		Transferred to FMC Fort Worth. Serving a 21-year-and-ten-month sentence; scheduled for release on May 12, 2027.	Member of the radical, clandestine environmentalist group Earth Liberation Front; pleaded guilty in 2008 to conspiracy and arson for committing a 1999 arson attack at Michigan State University's Agriculture Hall that caused $1 million in damage. Marius (Marie) Mason is one of the first transgender individuals to be diagnosed with gender dysphoria and given hormone treatment with testosterone. He was sentenced to 21 years and 10 months. Plans are set to move Mason from the female prison to the men's prison later on throughout his transition.
Aafia Siddiqui	90279-054		Serving an 86-year sentence; scheduled for release on June 30, 2082.	Pakistani neuroscientist; convicted in 2010 of attempting to murder US soldiers and FBI agents while in custody at a police station in Afghanistan after she was arrested on suspicion of being an Al-Qaeda operative in 2008.
Dora Cisneros	77877-079		Serving a life sentence.	Cisneros and one of her clients, Daniel Orlando Garza, were responsible for the murder of Joey Fisher.

== See also ==
- Federal Bureau of Prisons
- Federal Medical Center, Butner
- Federal Medical Center, Rochester
- Incarceration of women in the United States
- Prison Rape Elimination Act
- List of United States federal prisons
