= Puerto Rico Highway 169 =

Highway in Puerto Rico

Highway 169
- Ruta 169

Route information
- Maintained by Puerto Rico DTPW
- Length: 5.0 km (3.1 mi)

Major junctions
- South end: PR-1 / PR-8834 in Río
- PR-836 in Río; PR-837 in Guaynabo barrio-pueblo; PR-199 in Guaynabo barrio-pueblo
- North end: PR-20 in Frailes

Location
- Country: United States
- Territory: Puerto Rico
- Municipalities: Guaynabo

Highway system
- Roads in Puerto Rico; List
← PR-168	→ PR-170

Puerto Rico Highway 169 (PR-169) is a road located in Guaynabo, Puerto Rico. This highway begins at PR-1 in Río and ends at PR-20 in Frailes, passing through downtown Guaynabo.

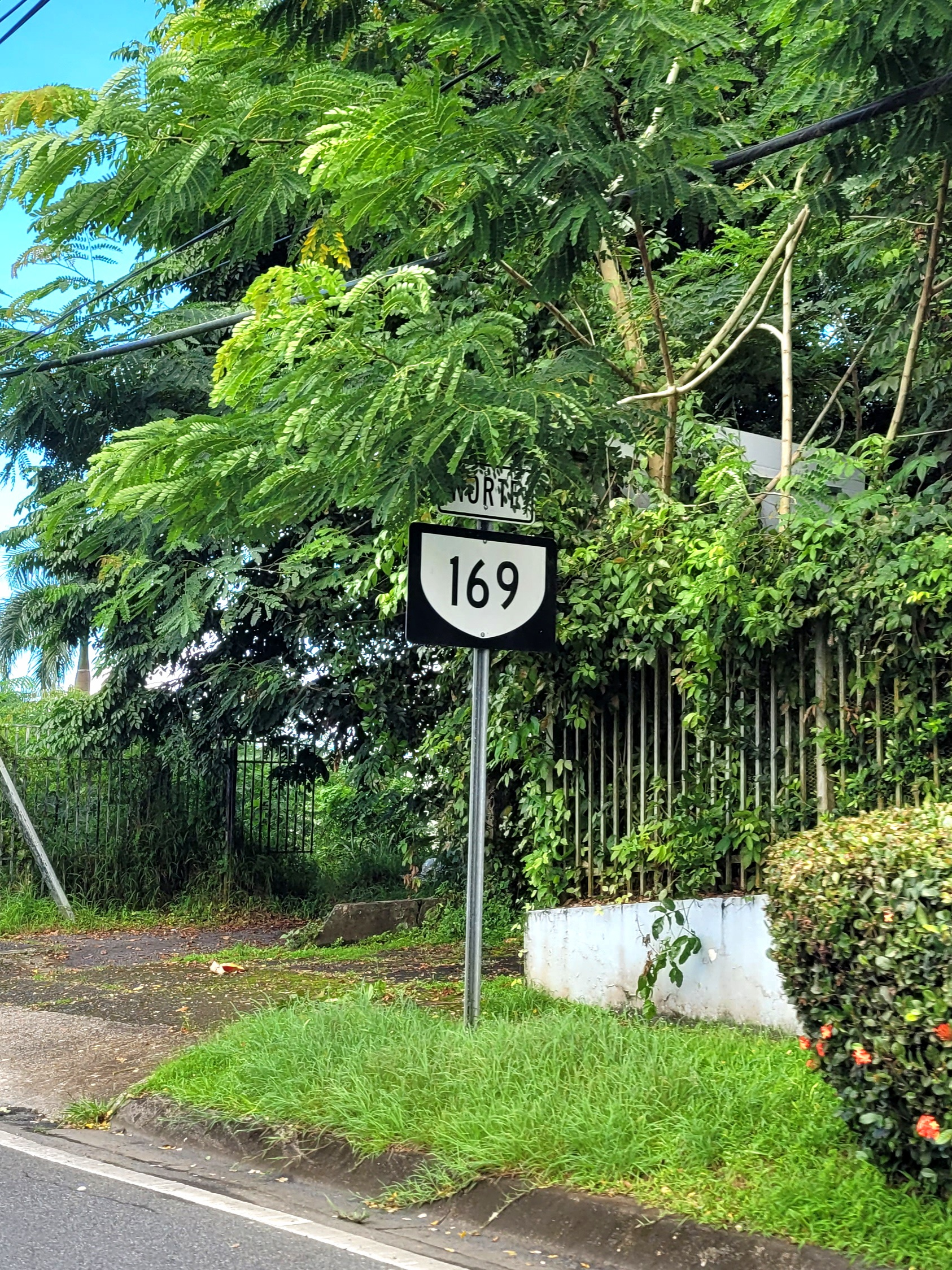
PR-169 in Guaynabo barrio-pueblo

== Major intersections ==
The entire route is located in Guaynabo.

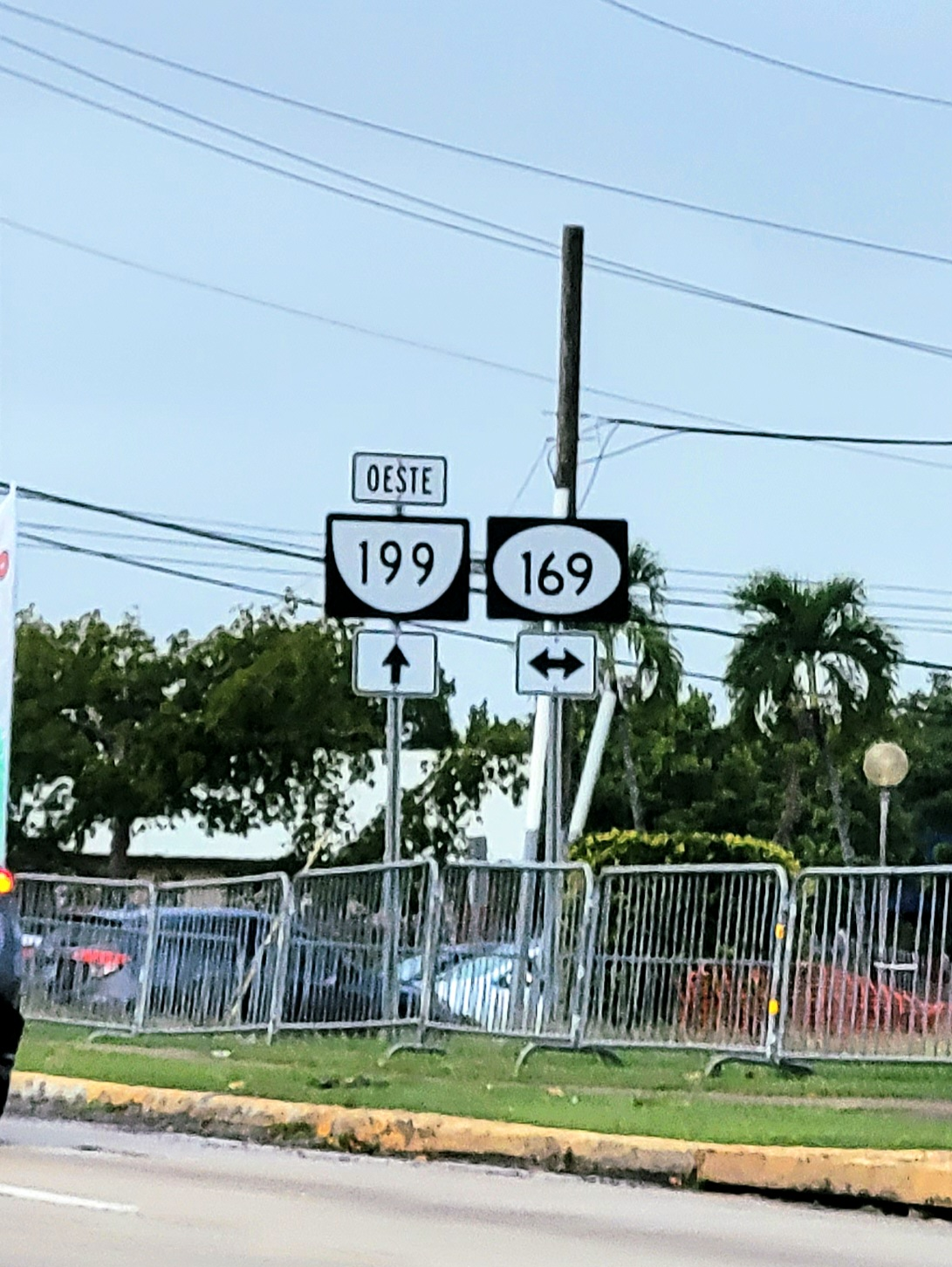
PR-199 west at PR-169 junction in Guaynabo barrio-pueblo

Location	km	mi	Destinations	Notes
Río	0.0	0.0	PR-8834 (Carretera Central) – Hato Nuevo, Sonadora	Continuation beyond PR-1
Río	0.0	0.0	PR-1 (Carretera Felipe "La Voz" Rodríguez) to PR-20 (Expreso Rafael Martínez Nadal) – Río Piedras, Caguas, Guaynabo	Southern terminus of PR-169 and northern terminus of PR-8834
Río	0.2	0.12	PR-Expreso La Muda-Mamey – Hato Nuevo, Sonadora	
Río	0.4– 0.5	0.25– 0.31	PR-836 – Camarones	
Camarones–Guaynabo barrio-pueblo line	3.0	1.9	To PR-20 (Expreso Rafael Martínez Nadal) / PR-Avenida David Urbina – Guaynabo	Roundabout
Guaynabo barrio-pueblo	3.6	2.2	PR-Calle Cecilio Urbina / PR-Calle Ramón Murga – Guaynabo	Roundabout
Guaynabo barrio-pueblo	3.8– 3.9	2.4– 2.4	PR-837 (Calle George R. Colton) – Santa Rosa	One-way street; southbound access via Calle Herminio Díaz Navarro
Guaynabo barrio-pueblo	4.3	2.7	PR-199 (Avenida Las Cumbres) – Río Piedras, Trujillo Alto	
Guaynabo barrio-pueblo	4.4	2.7	PR-Avenida Arbolote – Guaynabo	
Frailes	4.9	3.0	PR-Avenida Francisco "Paco" Carvajal – Guaynabo	
Frailes	5.0	3.1	PR-20 (Expreso Rafael Martínez Nadal) / PR-Avenida Lopategui – San Juan, Caguas	Northern terminus of PR-169; incomplete diamond interchange; no access from PR-20 northbound
1.000 mi = 1.609 km; 1.000 km = 0.621 mi: Incomplete access
