= Mamey, Guaynabo, Puerto Rico =

Barrio of Puerto Rico

Mamey
- Barrio
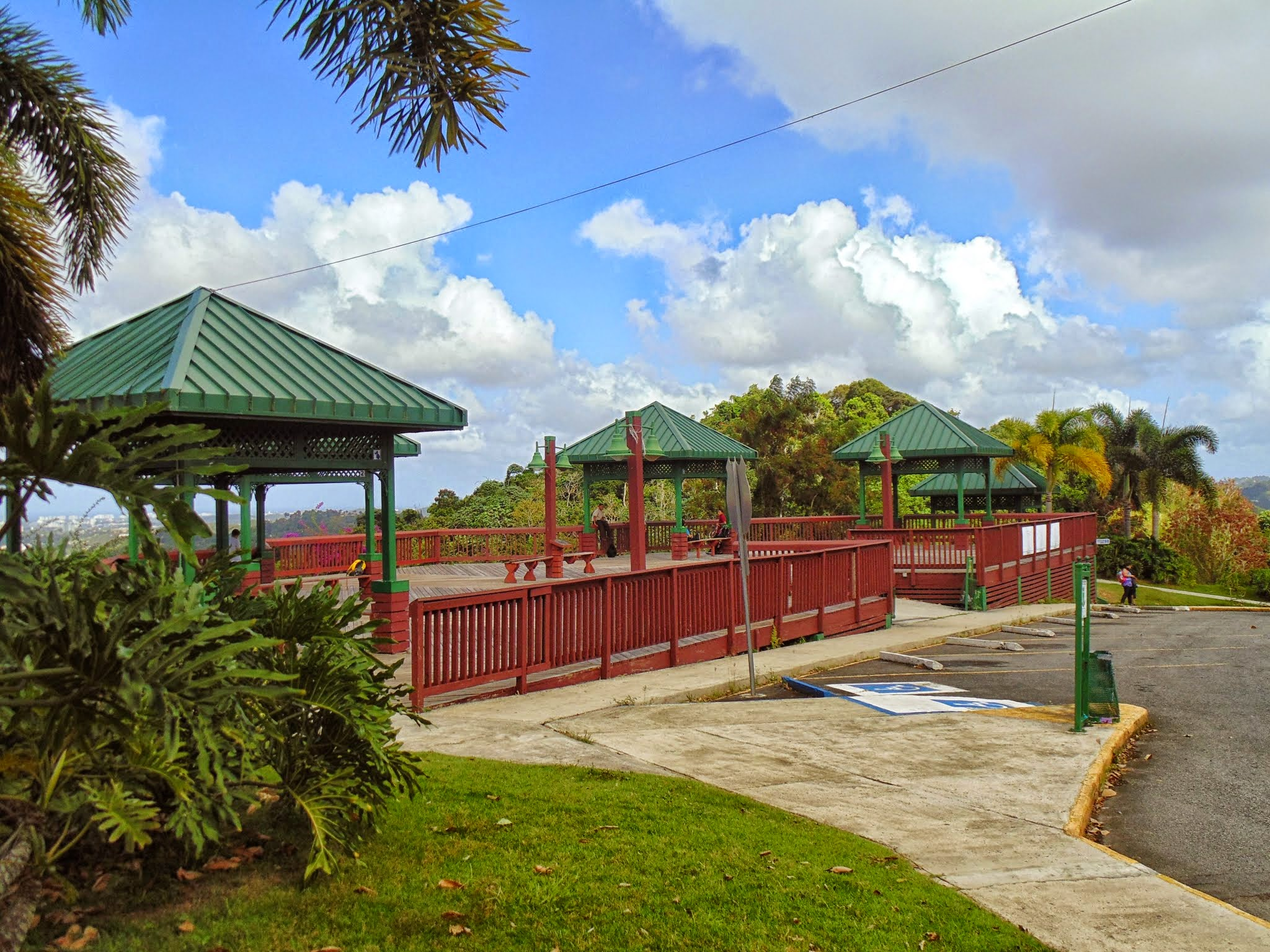
- Mirador Gavillan scenic overlook in Mamey

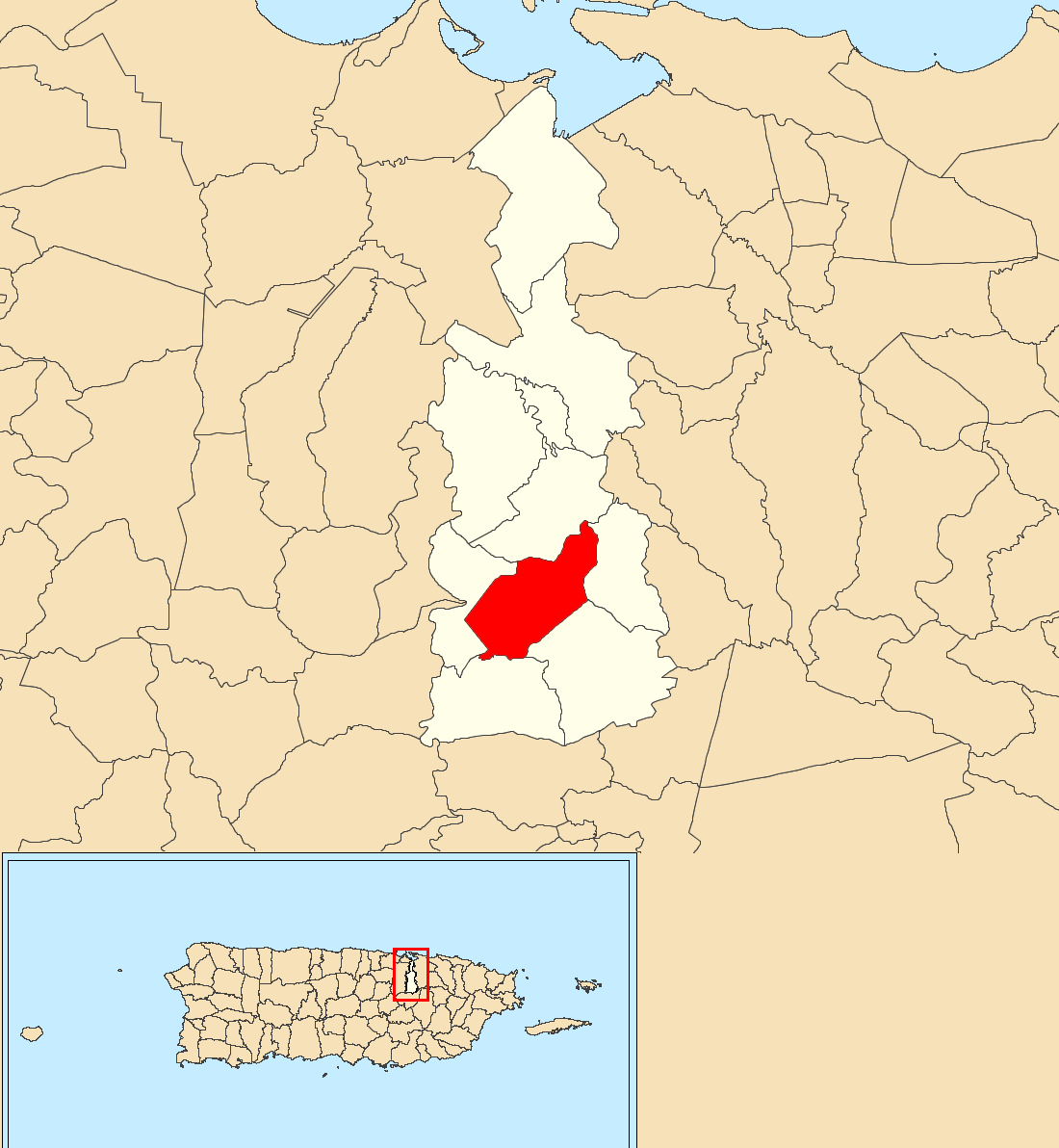
- Location of Mamey within the municipality of Guaynabo shown in red

- Location of Puerto Rico
- Coordinates: 18°18′54″N 66°06′58″W
- Commonwealth: Puerto Rico
- Municipality: Guaynabo

Area
  - Total: 2.45 sq mi (6.3 km^{2})
  - Land: 2.45 sq mi (6.3 km^{2})
  - Water: 0 sq mi (0 km^{2})
- Elevation: 607 ft (185 m)

Population (2010)
  - Total: 3,103
  - Density: 1,266.5/sq mi (489.0/km^{2})
- Source: 2010 Census
- Time zone: UTC−4 (AST)

Mamey is a barrio in the municipality of Guaynabo, Puerto Rico. Its population in 2010 was 3,103.

Historical population
Census	Pop.	Note	%±
1910	940		—
1920	949		1.0%
1930	1,015		7.0%
1940	1,307		28.8%
1950	1,243		−4.9%
1960	1,959		57.6%
1970	1,690		−13.7%
1980	2,097		24.1%
1990	2,279		8.7%
2000	3,165		38.9%
2010	3,103		−2.0%
U.S. Decennial Census; 1899 (shown as 1900) 1910-1930; 1930-1950 1980-2000 2010

== Sectors ==
Barrios (which are, in contemporary times, roughly comparable to minor civil divisions) in turn are further subdivided into smaller local populated place areas/units called "sectores" (sectors in English). The types of sectores may vary, from normally sector to urbanización to reparto to barriada to residencial, among others.

The following sectors are in Mamey barrio:

Barrio Mamey I, Calle Domingo González Lugo, Sector Antonio González, Sector Barrio Mamey II, Sector Cancel, Sector Carrillo, Sector Centeno, Sector Félix Urbina, Sector Figueroa, Sector Garcia, Sector Julio Pietro, Sector Los Castro, Sector Los Lagunas, Sector Paso Hondo, Sector Pedro Reyes, and Sector Rivera Rosado.

== Sites ==
Mirador Gavillan is a scenic lookout located in Mamey that provides for views of the metropolitan area (San Juan).

== Gallery ==
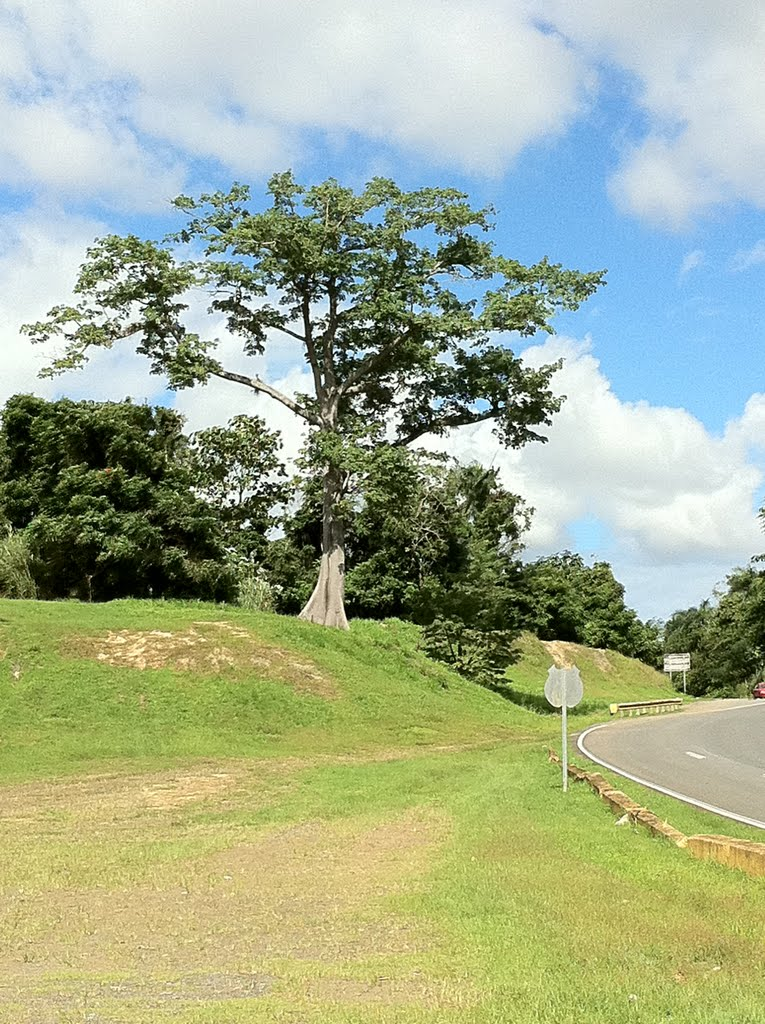
A Ceiba tree in Mamey at Expreso la Muda

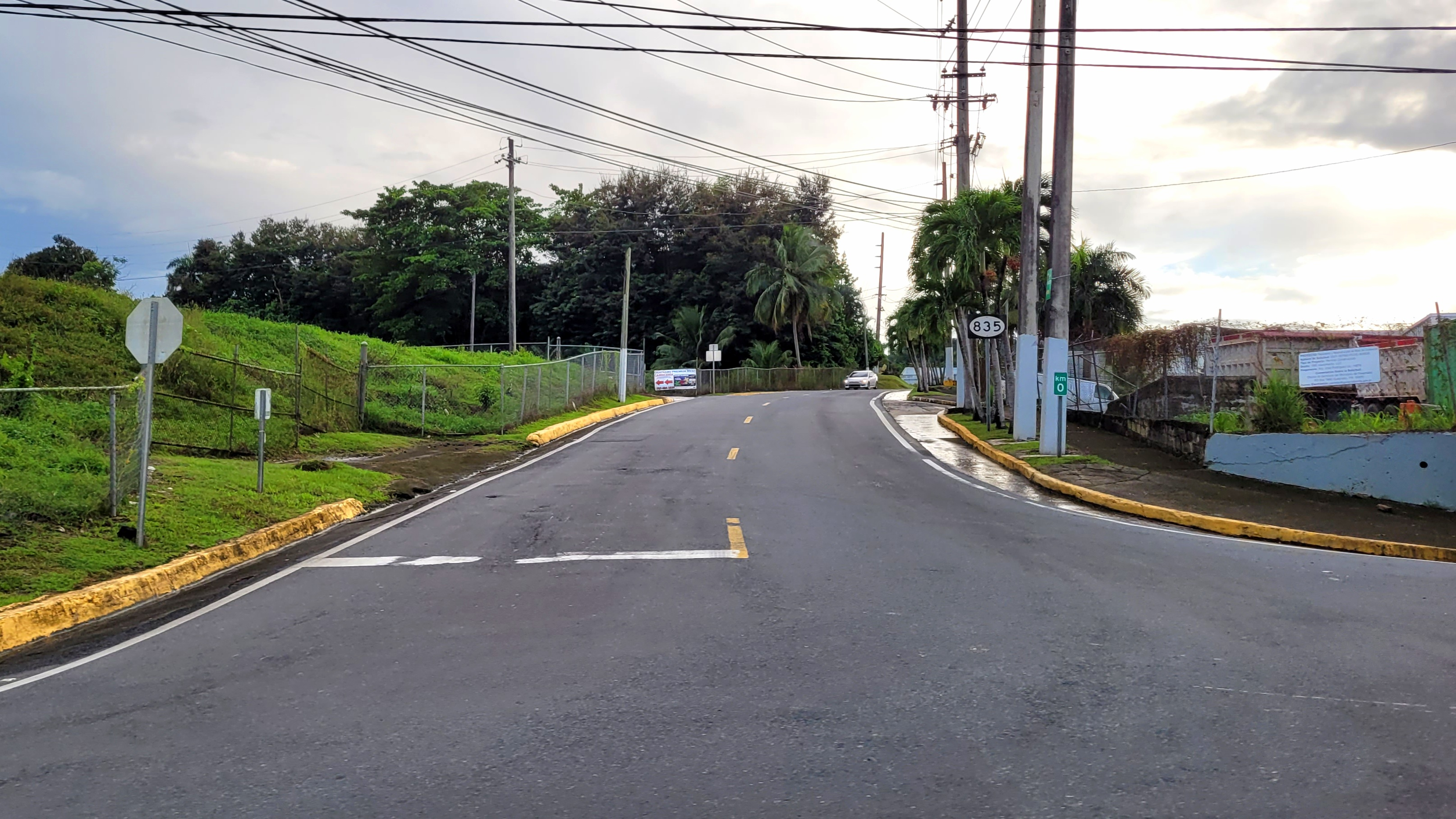
Puerto Rico Highway 835 in Mamey

== See also ==
- List of communities in Puerto Rico
- List of barrios and sectors of Guaynabo, Puerto Rico
