= Camarones, Guaynabo, Puerto Rico =

Barrio of Puerto Rico

Camarones
- Barrio
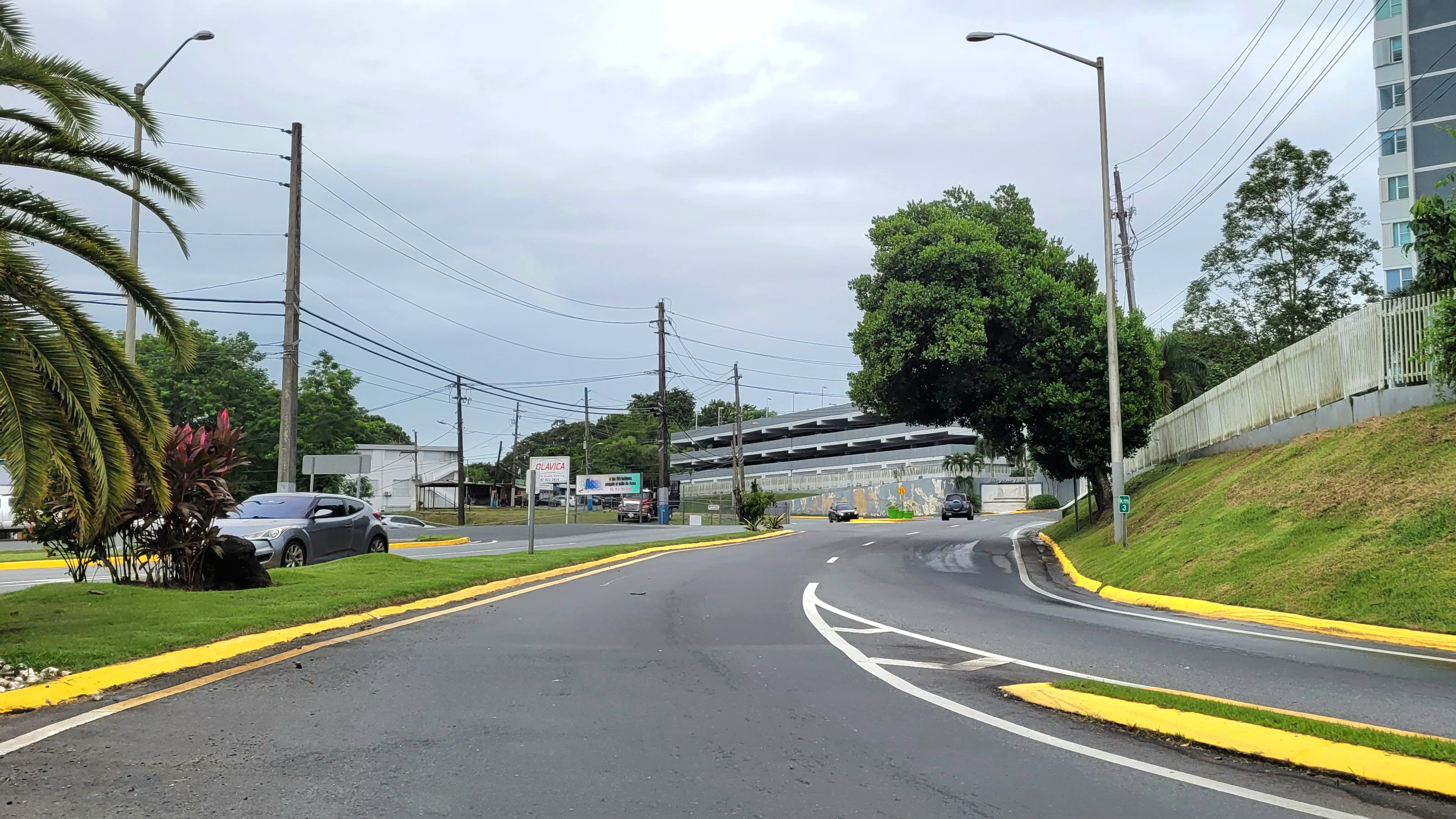
- Puerto Rico Highway 169 between Camarones and Guaynabo barrio-pueblo

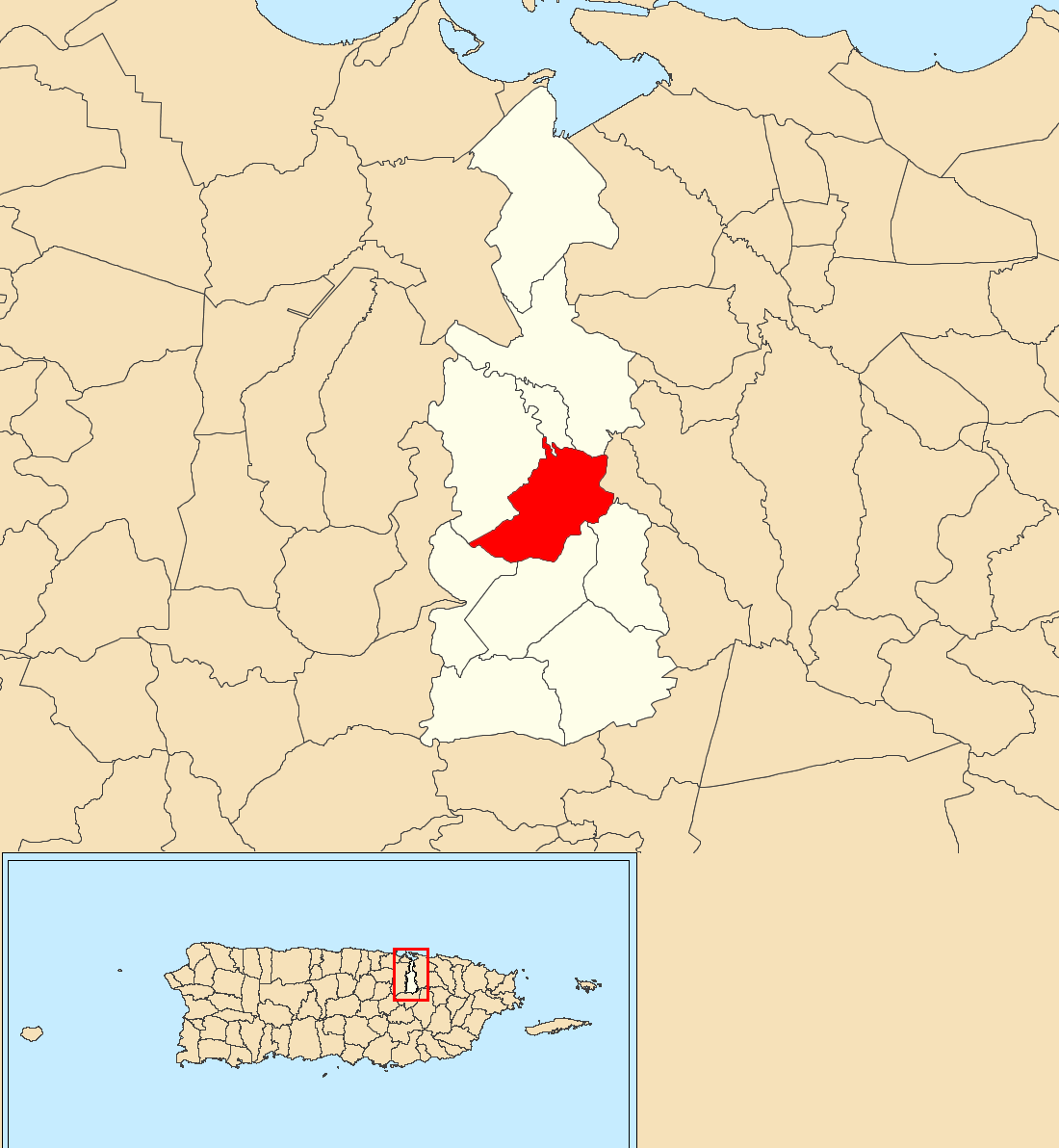
- Location of Camarones within the municipality of Guaynabo shown in red

- Location of Puerto Rico
- Coordinates: 18°20′12″N 66°06′41″W
- Commonwealth: Puerto Rico
- Municipality: Guaynabo

Area
  - Total: 2.44 sq mi (6.3 km^{2})
  - Land: 2.44 sq mi (6.3 km^{2})
  - Water: 0 sq mi (0 km^{2})
- Elevation: 157 ft (48 m)

Population (2010)
  - Total: 5,626
  - Density: 2,305.7/sq mi (890.2/km^{2})
- Source: 2010 Census
- Time zone: UTC−4 (AST)

Camarones is a barrio in the municipality of Guaynabo, Puerto Rico. Its population in 2010 was 5,626.

== History ==
The name camarones meaning "shrimp" in English comes from the Camarones River.

Camarones was in Spain's gazetteers until Puerto Rico was ceded by Spain in the aftermath of the Spanish–American War under the terms of the Treaty of Paris of 1898 and became an unincorporated territory of the United States. In 1899, the United States Department of War conducted a census of Puerto Rico finding that the population of Camarones barrio was 620.

Historical population
Census	Pop.	Note	%±
1900	620		—
1910	680		9.7%
1920	818		20.3%
1930	1,027		25.6%
1940	1,367		33.1%
1950	1,624		18.8%
1960	2,778		71.1%
1970	0		−100.0%
1980	4,674		—
1990	5,585		19.5%
2000	6,311		13.0%
2010	5,626		−10.9%
2020	4,919		−12.6%
U.S. Decennial Census; 1899 (shown as 1900) 1910-1930; 1930-1950 1980-2000 2010

== Sectors ==
Barrios (which are, in contemporary times, roughly comparable to minor civil divisions) in turn are further subdivided into smaller local populated place areas/units called sectores (sectors in English). The types of sectores may vary, from normally sector to urbanización to reparto to barriada to residencial, among others.

The following sectors are in Camarones barrio:

Barrio Camarones Centro, Calle Amapola, Calle Los López, Calle Los Pinos, Condominios Alamanda, Egida Mi Sagrada Familia, Sector Altos de Camarones, Sector Apama, Sector El Cementerio, Sector El Hoyo, Sector La Pachanga, Sector La Pagana, Sector Los Angeles, Sector Los Cabellos, Sector Los Condenados, Sector Los Guayabo, Sector Los López, Sector Los Machuca, Sector Los Manzanos, Sector Mangotín, Sector Manhattan, Sector Morán, Sector Moscú, Sector Petra Ortiz, Sector Puente Salomón Rondón, Sector Rogelio García, Sector Sánchez López, Sector Siso Nazario, Short Hills, and Urbanización Estancias de APAMA I y II.

== Crime ==
Carjackings are a problem in Guaynabo and other areas of Puerto Rico, as well. In 1992, carjackings were deemed a federal crime. In 2022, a Carjacking Prevention Campaign was launched.

== Notable people ==
Several notable musicians have come out of Camarones barrio in Guaynabo including: Juan Pablo Rosario (El papa de los cantaros), the Morales brothers (Ramito, Moralito, Luisito and Casito) who were troubadours. Angel Alfonso Cruz "Alfonsillo", musician and troubadour singer. Vitín Cruz "El Canario", brother of "Alfonsillo" also a good troubadour, Toño León, Willie Berrios and Elvis Crespo, who sings Merengue.

== See also ==
- List of communities in Puerto Rico
- List of barrios and sectors of Guaynabo, Puerto Rico
