= Pueblo Viejo, Guaynabo, Puerto Rico =

Barrio of Puerto Rico

Pueblo Viejo
- Barrio
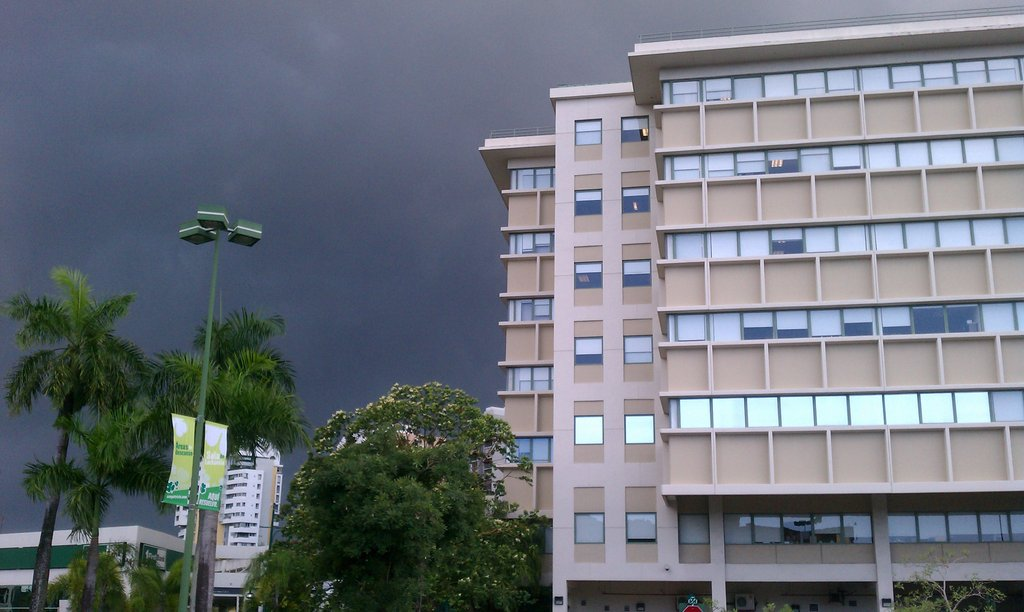
- Storm clouds over an office building in Pueblo Viejo barrio

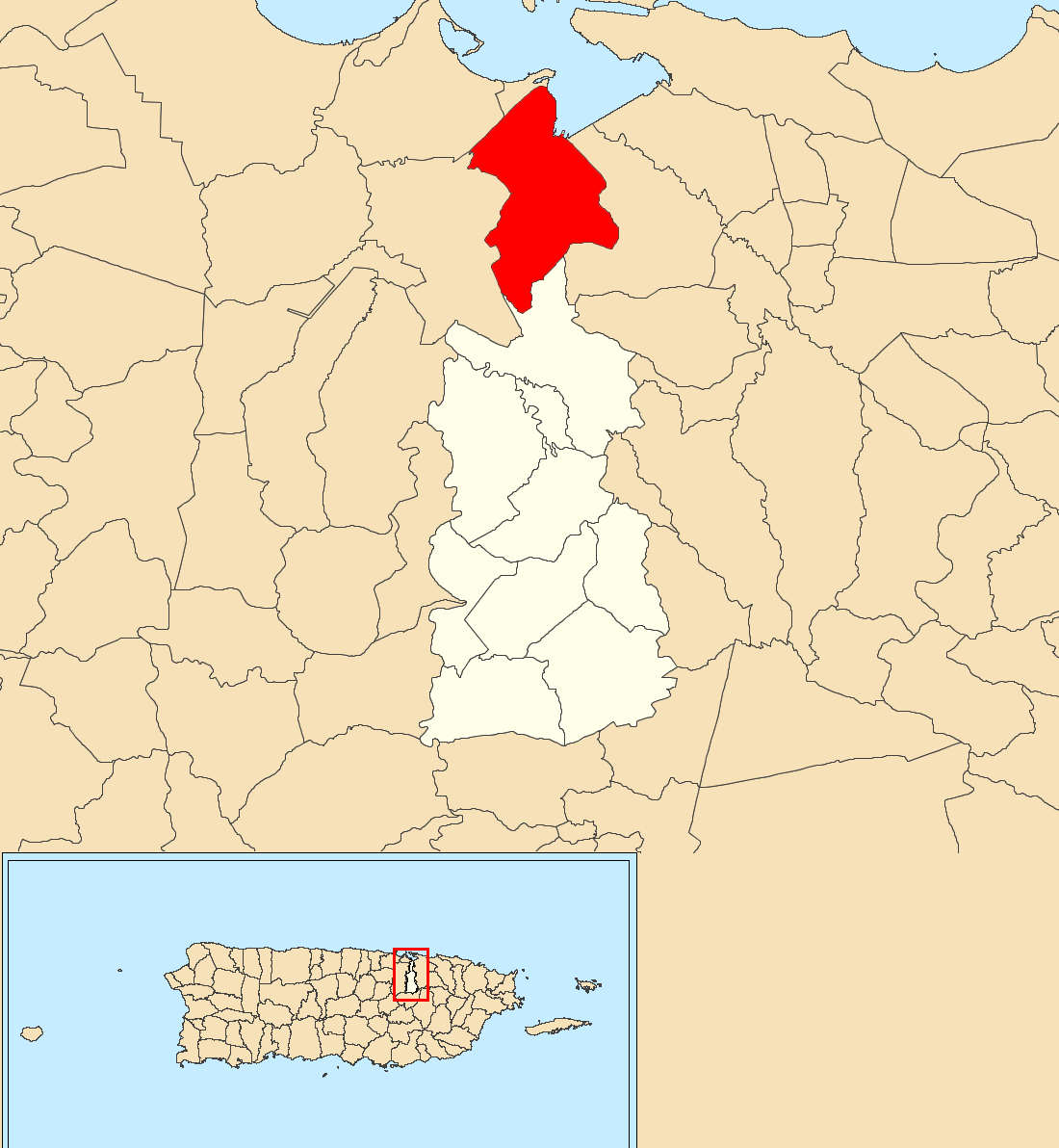
- Location of Pueblo Viejo within the municipality of Guaynabo shown in red

- Location of Puerto Rico
- Coordinates: 18°24′49″N 66°06′49″W
- Commonwealth: Puerto Rico
- Municipality: Guaynabo

Area
  - Total: 4.76 sq mi (12.3 km^{2})
  - Land: 4.63 sq mi (12.0 km^{2})
  - Water: 0.13 sq mi (0.34 km^{2})
- Elevation: 75 ft (23 m)

Population (2020)
  - Total: 21,874
- Source: 2020 Census
- Time zone: UTC−4 (AST)

Pueblo Viejo is a barrio in the municipality of Guaynabo, Puerto Rico. Its population in 2020 was 21,874.

== History ==
In 1508, Juan Ponce de León founded the original Spanish settlement in Puerto Rico at Caparra (named after the province of Cáceres, Spain, the birthplace of then-governor of Spain's Caribbean territories Nicolás de Ovando), which today is known as Pueblo Viejo barrio.

Pueblo Viejo was in Spain's gazetteers until Puerto Rico was ceded by Spain in the aftermath of the Spanish–American War under the terms of the Treaty of Paris of 1898 and became an unincorporated territory of the United States. In 1899, the United States Department of War conducted a census of Puerto Rico finding that the population of Pueblo Viejo barrio was 480.

Historical population
Census	Pop.	Note	%±
1900	480		—
1910	741		54.4%
1920	1,687		127.7%
1930	3,564		111.3%
1940	5,813		63.1%
1950	13,956		140.1%
1960	19,266		38.0%
1970	0		−100.0%
1980	38,930		—
1990	27,744		−28.7%
2000	26,109		−5.9%
2010	23,816		−8.8%
2020	21,874		−8.2%
U.S. Decennial Census; 1899 (shown as 1900) 1910-1930; 1930-1950 1980-2000 2010 2020

== Sectors ==
Barrios (which are, in contemporary times, roughly comparable to minor civil divisions) in turn are further subdivided into smaller local populated place areas/units called sectores (sectors in English). The types of sectores may vary, from normally sector to urbanización to reparto to barriada to residencial, among others.

The following sectors are in Pueblo Viejo barrio:

Apartamentos Gallardo, Barriada San Miguel, Barriada Vietnam, Barrio Juan Domingo, Barrio Sabana, Buchanan, Calle Emilia, Calle Flamboyán, Calle Pedro Pedroza, Calle San Miguel, Calle Wilson, Callejón Caridad, Comunidad Amelia, Condominios Acgualina, Condominios Amarillys, Condominios Arcos de Suchville, Condominios Art At San Patricio, Condominios Asizi, Condominios Bel-Air, Condominios Belén, Condominios Caparra Chalets, Condominios Caparra Classic, Condominios Caparra Hills Tower, Condominios Caparra Hills Village, Condominios Caparra Real, Condominios Casa Magna Court, Condominios Chalets de Caparra, Condominios Ciudad Condor, Condominios Colonial Court, Condominios Doral Plaza, Condominios El Cordovés, Condominios El Jardín, Condominios El Laurel, Condominios Garden Court, Condominios Garden Hills Chalets, Condominios Garden Hills Plaza I, Condominios Garden Hills Plaza II, Condominios Garden Hills Tower, Condominios Garden Hills Town Park, Condominios Garden Hills Villas, Condominios Garden Village, Condominios Gardenville, Condominios Generalife, Condominios IL’Villagio, Condominios L’Hermitage, Condominios Los Caobos Plaza, Condominios Los Patricios, Condominios Luis Muñoz Marín, Condominios Madre Selva, Condominios Mansiones de Garden Hills I y II, Condominios Mansiones Los Caobos, Condominios Meadows Towers, Condominios Milan Court, Condominios Miradores de Sabana, Condominios Novas Court Town Houses, Condominios Palm Circle, Condominios Park Royal, Condominios Parkside, Condominios Parque de Villa Caparra, Condominios Parque San Patricio I y II, Condominios Pisos de Caparra, Condominios Plaza Athenne, Condominios Plaza Real Caparra, Condominios Ponce de León, Condominios Portales de San Patricio, Condominios Porto Fino, Condominios Saint Morritz, Condominios San Patricio Apartamentos, Condominios San Patricio Chalets, Condominios San Patricio I y II, Condominios San Patricio Meadows, Condominios Santa Ana, Condominios Suchville Park, Condominios The Village At Suchville, Condominios The Village, Condominios Torres de Caparra, Condominios Town Houses Villa Caparra, Condominios Vía Caparra, Condominios Villa Caparra Court, Condominios Villa Caparra Executive, Condominios Villa Caparra Plaza, Condominios Villa Caparra Tower, Condominios Villa Caparra Town Park, Hogar San José de la Montaña, Residencial Zenón Díaz Valcárcel, Sector Buen Samaritano, Sector Fondo del Saco, Sector Jerusalén, Sector La Esperanza, Sector Robles, Urbanización Alturas de San Patricio, Urbanización Arboleda, Urbanización Balcones de Sevilla, Urbanización Caparra Hills, Urbanización Caparra Town Park, Urbanización Chalets de la Reina, Urbanización Garden Hills Estate, Urbanización Garden Hills, Urbanización Georgetown, Urbanización Golden Gate, Urbanización Los Caobos Apartamentos, Urbanización Los Caobos, Urbanización Mansiones de Garden Hills, Urbanización Mansiones de Tintillo, Urbanización Parkside, Urbanización Parque de Villa Caparra, Urbanización Parque San Patricio, Urbanización San Patricio, Urbanización Suchville, Urbanización Sunset Harbor, Urbanización Susan Court (Calle Patricia: Casas 9, 10, 47 a la 51), Urbanización Terrazas de Tintillo (Calle 1: casas 1 a la 5 y 13 a la 16, Calle Wall: Casas 17 a la 20), Urbanización Tintillo Gardens, Urbanización Tintillo Hills (casas 507, 507ª y de la 600 a la 612), Urbanización Tintillo, Urbanización Town House San Patricio, Urbanización Villa Concepción 1 y 2, Urbanización Villa de Flamboyán, Urbanización Villa Elsie, Urbanización Villa Trujillo, Urbanización Villa Verde, Urbanización Villas de Tintillo, Urbanización Y Extensión Villa Caparra, and Víctor Braegger.

== Gallery ==
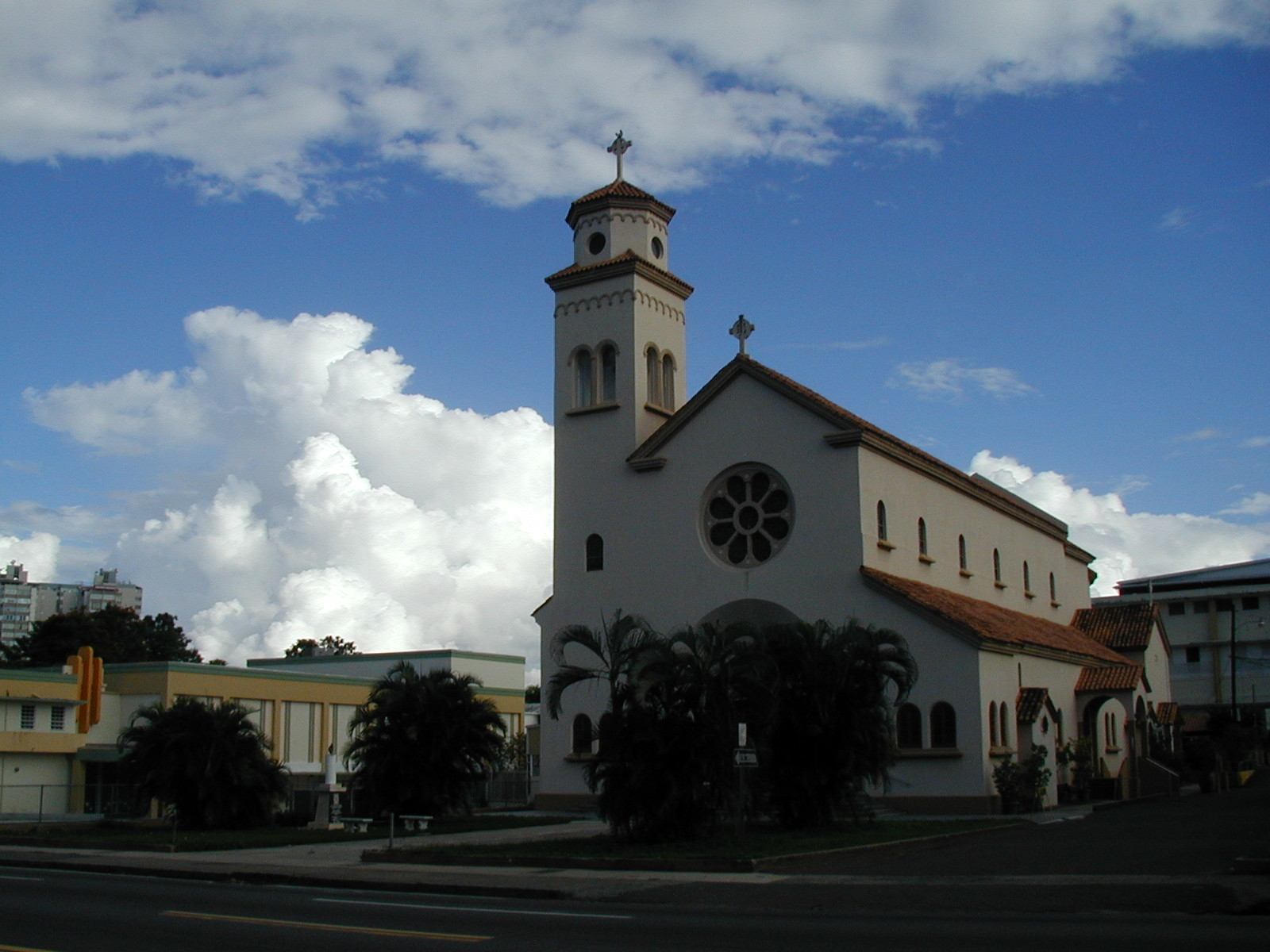
Parroquia San Jose, Urbanización Villa Caparra

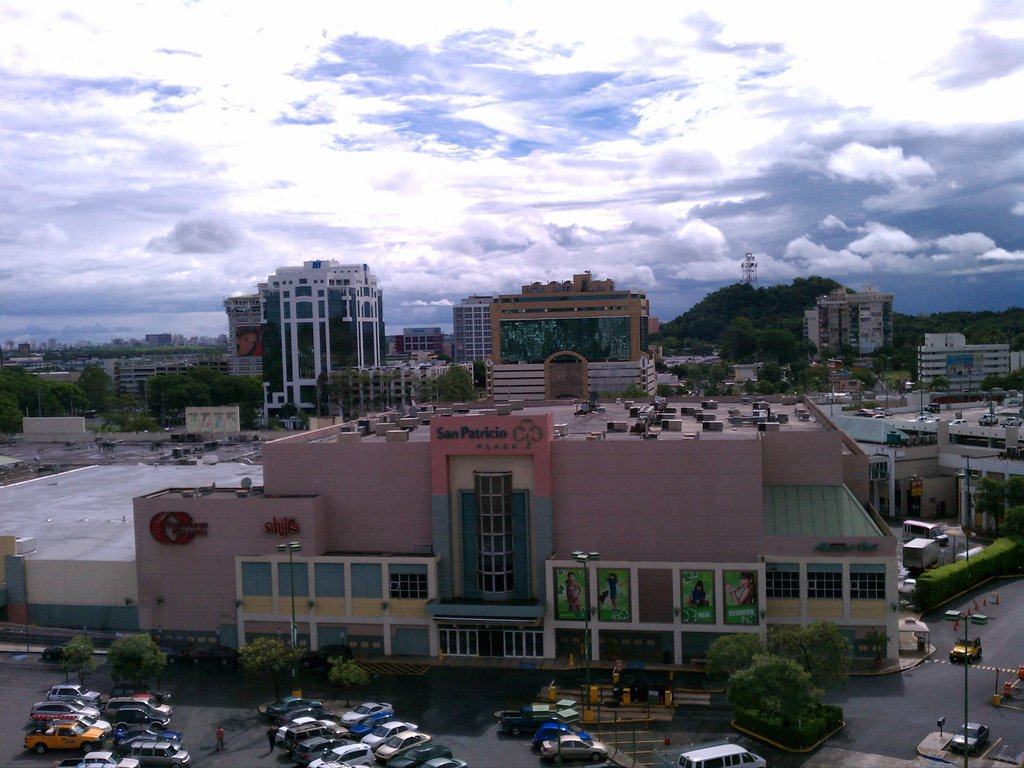
Caribbean Cinema at San Patricio Plaza in Pueblo Viejo

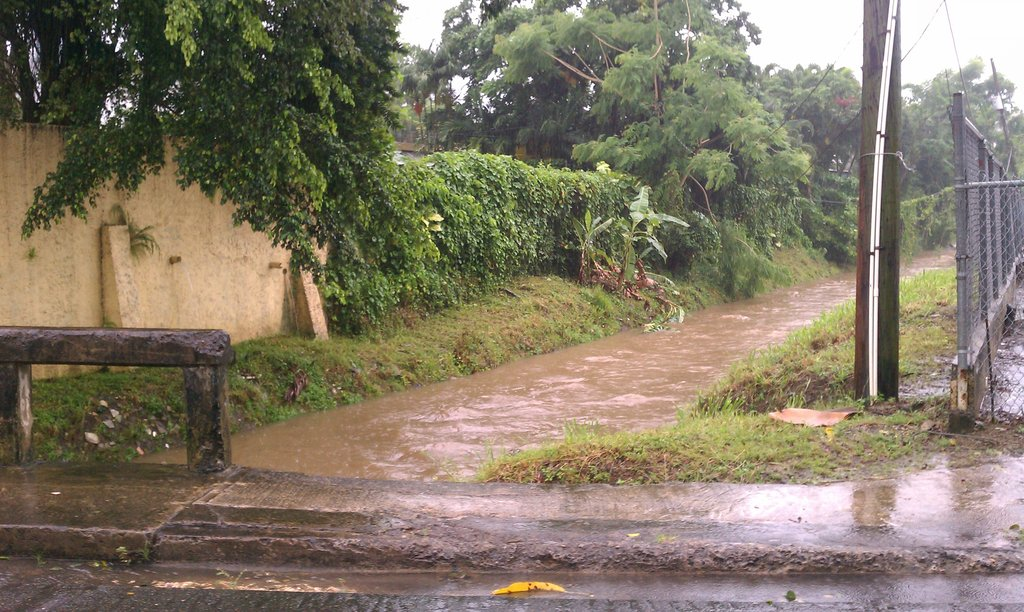
Stream near San Patricio Plaza in Pueblo Viejo barrio

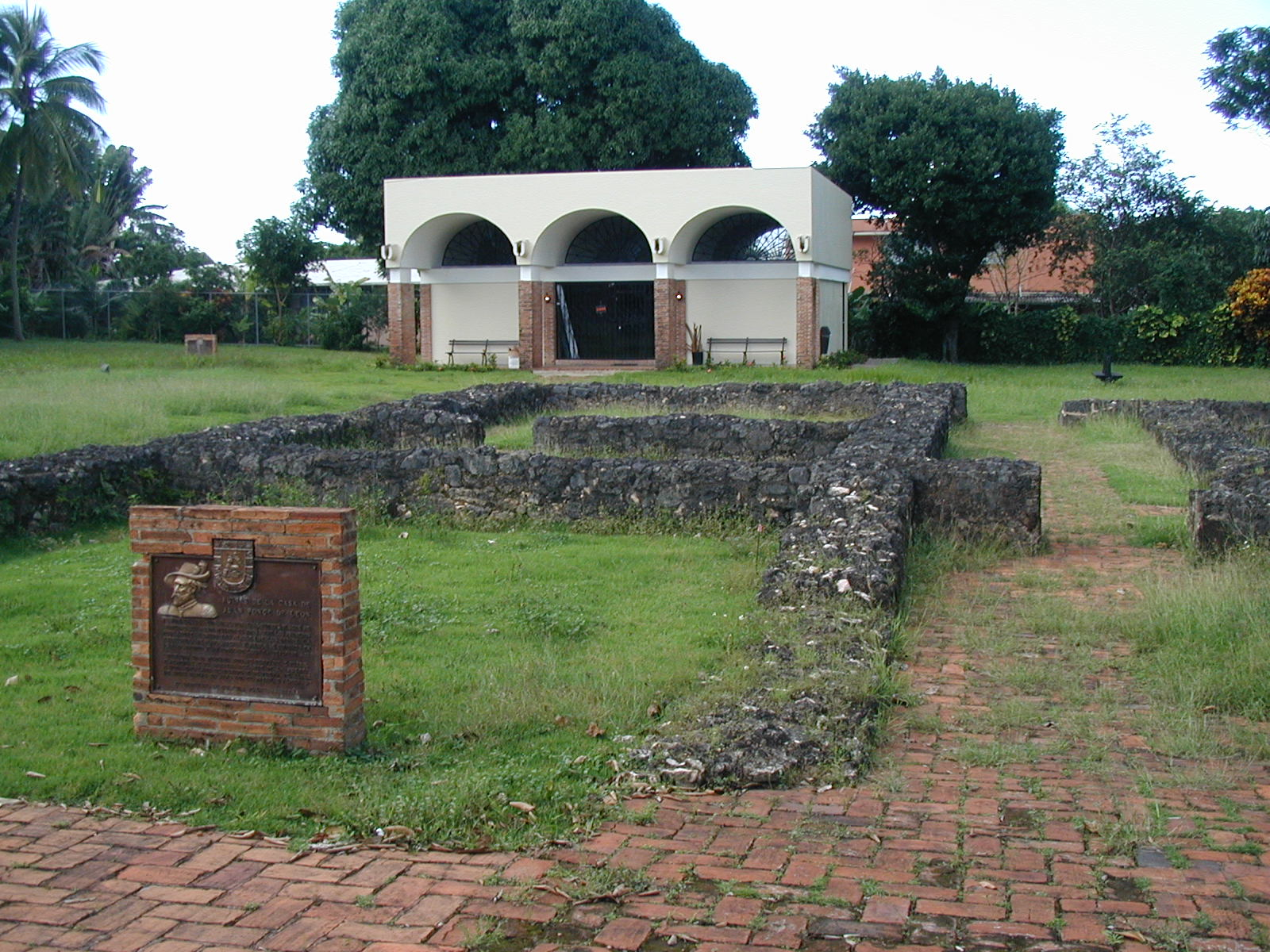
Caparra Archaeological Site in Pueblo Viejo

== See also ==
- List of communities in Puerto Rico
- List of barrios and sectors of Guaynabo, Puerto Rico
- Caparra Archaeological Site
