= Caparra Archaeological Site =

Archaeological site in Guaynabo, Puerto Rico

- Caparra
- U.S. National Register of Historic Places
- U.S. National Historic Landmark
- Puerto Rico Historic Sites and Zones
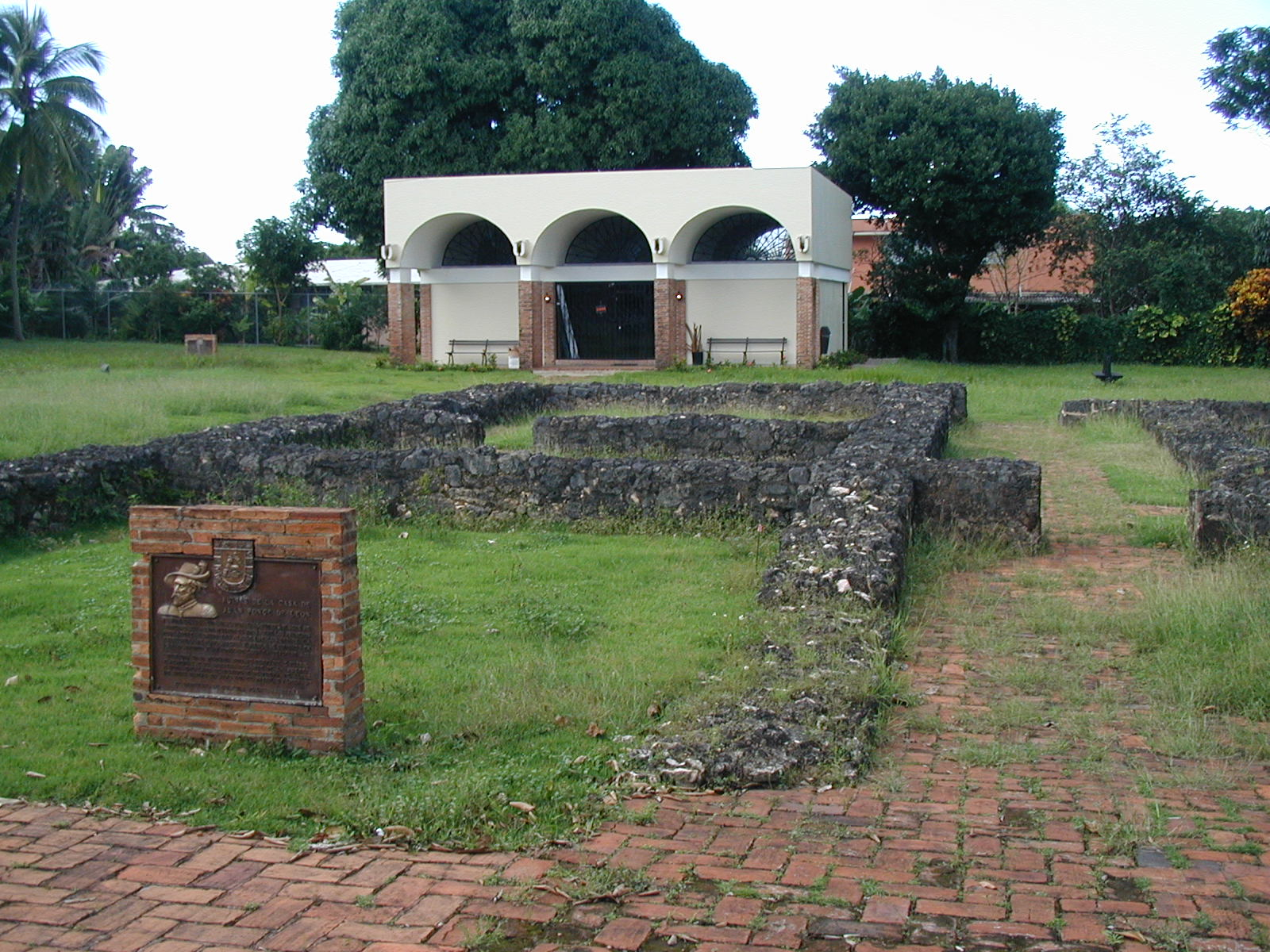
- The foundations of the residence of Juan Ponce de León, Late 1508

- Location within Puerto Rico
- Location: Guaynabo, Puerto Rico
- Coordinates: 18°24′18″N 66°06′51″W
- Area: 3 acres (1.2 ha)
- Built: Late 1508
- NRHP reference No.: 84003155
- RNSZH No.: 2000-(RMSJ)-00-JP-SH

Significant dates
- Added to NRHP: February 28, 1984
- Designated NHL: April 19, 1994
- Designated RNSZH: February 3, 2000

Caparra is an archaeological site containing the remains of the village of Caparra, the first European settlement in the main island of Puerto Rico. Located in the Pueblo Viejo barrio of the municipality of Guaynabo on the grounds of the Museo y Parque Histórico Ruinas de Caparra (Original Residence of Juan Ponce de León) near the town line with the capital municipality of San Juan, it is centered around the foundations of the residence of Juan Ponce de León, the first European conquistador and governor of Puerto Rico, who established the settlement as the capital of Puerto Rico in late 1508. It is a U.S. National Historic Landmark, as it represents the oldest known European settlement in the United States.

Caparra, also known by its settlers as the city of Puerto Rico, was founded in the southern side of San Juan Bay. However, the settlement was overwhelmed with health, defense, logistical, and communication difficulties due to its surrounding low-lying, swampy terrain. From 1519 to 1521, to facilitate the development of the settlement, it was reestablished on the nearby San Juan Islet in the northern side of San Juan Bay under the name of San Juan Bautista de Puerto Rico (Saint John Baptist of Rich Port), present day the Old San Juan historic quarter in the capital municipality of San Juan.

== History ==
In late 1508, Juan Ponce de León founded the original Spanish settlement in Puerto Rico at Caparra, named after the abandoned ancient Roman village of Cáparra in the province of Cáceres, Spain, the birthplace of then-governor of Spain's Caribbean territories Nicolás de Ovando. Today, it is known as the Pueblo Viejo barrio of Guaynabo, just to the west of the capital of San Juan.

The air was not wholesome and the mendicant friars insisted on moving the settlement closer to the bay and to the sea. They complained that infants were dying. Their preferred area was that of an elevated islet located at the entrance of the bay.

It was not until the end of Ponce de León's tenure as governor that they had their wish. By 1521, the move was complete. It was officially named San Juan Bautista de Puerto Rico (Saint John Baptist of Rich Port), but it was most commonly referred to as Puerto Rico. By the 17th century, the name of the island, San Juan Bautista, had traded places with what is now the capital: San Juan.

According to Floyd, "Ponce built the only stone house in the village, which for years functioned additionally as the Casa de Contratación, the archive, and the arsenal." It became his permanent home, where he was joined by his family in 1509.

== Archaeological history ==
The Caparra Site was first identified as important during a survey in 1936, as part of a program to develop tourist facilities on the island. Preliminary excavations spearheaded by Puerto Rico's fifth official historian, Adolfo de Hostos, in 1936 and 1937, identified a large tapia structure, bisected by a two-lane highway, that matched de León's description of his own residence, the only non-wooden structure in the settlement. Further excavation identified the main plaza and the sites of other buildings.

The property was acquired by the Puerto Rico government in 1948, which relocated the northern section of the house ruins in order to widen the road. The roadway was again widened in 1963, destroying the southern portion of the structure excavated in 1936. The museum was established in 1958; the site continues to be examined by archaeologists.

== In folklore ==
A story from 1530 says that two Spanish men, Diego Ramos de Orozco and Diego Guilarte de Salazar, were living in Caparra and searching for gold in Puerto Rico's rivers, for Spain. They each had at their disposal 40 Taíno slaves. Good friends, they elaborated a plan to travel to a hard to reach, secret place in order to excavate and find gold for themselves and their own fortunes.

Immediately upon finding a large piece of gold that they had originally agreed to share, their friendship was tested. In conniving to keep the gold, Orozco used fake dice, but then suffered a bad fall. Days later, when his friend Guilarte finally returned with help, Orozco lay dying, and confessed to having used fake dice and asked his friend for forgiveness. Sierra de Orozco, a mountain located in the Cordillera Central, is named after Orozco.

== See also ==
- List of United States National Historic Landmarks in United States commonwealths and territories, associated states, and foreign states
- National Register of Historic Places listings in metropolitan San Juan, Puerto Rico
