= List of barrios and sectors of Guaynabo, Puerto Rico =

Like all municipalities of Puerto Rico, Guaynabo is subdivided into administrative units called barrios, which are, in contemporary times, roughly comparable to minor civil divisions, (and means wards or boroughs or neighborhoods in English). The barrios and subbarrios, in turn, are further subdivided into smaller local populated place areas/units called sectores (sectors in English). The types of sectores may vary, from normally sector to urbanización to reparto to barriada to residencial, among others. Some sectors appear in two barrios.

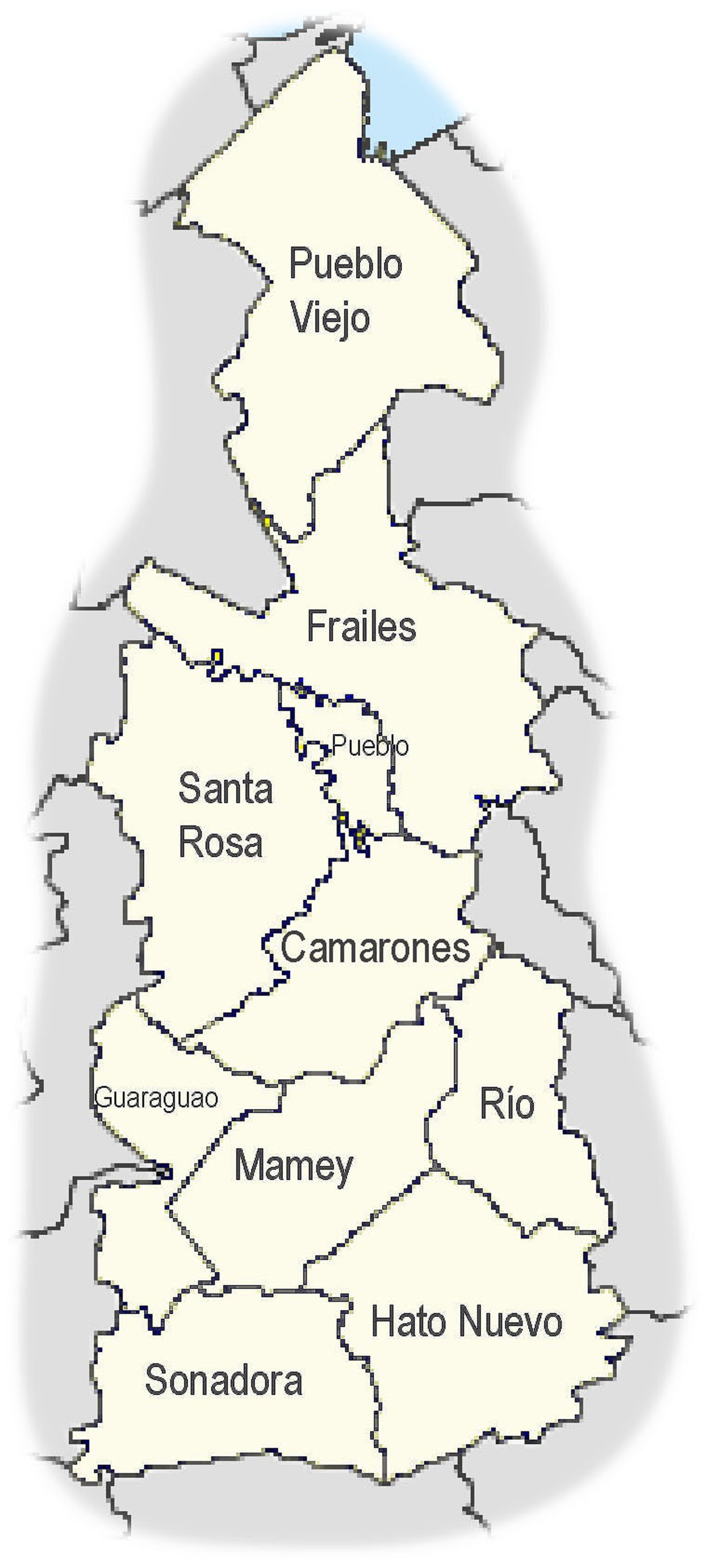
Guaynabo map with barrio subdivisions

In Guaynabo, the 10 barrios are subdivided into a total of 520 sectors. Among those, 161 bear sector in their names. Those are typically rural sectors. 145 condominios (apartment buildings), 129 urbanización (residential areas), and 37 calle (street, also typically rural sectors).

== List of sectors by barrio ==
=== Camarones ===
1. Barrio Camarones Centro
2. Calle Amapola
3. Calle Los López
4. Calle Los Pinos
5. Condominios Alamanda
6. Egida Mi Sagrada Familia
7. Sector Altos de Camarones
8. Sector Apama
9. Sector El Cementerio
10. Sector El Hoyo
11. Sector La Pachanga
12. Sector La Pagana
13. Sector Los Angeles
14. Sector Los Cabellos
15. Sector Los Condenados
16. Sector Los Guayabo
17. Sector Los López
18. Sector Los Machuca
19. Sector Los Manzanos
20. Sector Mangotín
21. Sector Manhattan
22. Sector Morán
23. Sector Moscú
24. Sector Petra Ortiz
25. Sector Puente Salomón Rondón
26. Sector Rogelio García
27. Sector Sánchez López
28. Sector Siso Nazario
29. Short Hills
30. Urbanización Estancias de APAMA I y II

=== Frailes ===
1. Apartamentos Valles de Torrimar
2. Avenida Los Filtros
3. Barriada Cano
4. Barriada Cruz Meléndez
5. Barrio Frailes Llano
6. Barrio Piedras Blancas
7. Calle Casimiro Villegas
8. Calle Juan Martínez
9. Calle Ramón Murgas
10. Calle Vandal
11. Calle Villegas Valcarcel
12. Comunidad Los Frailes
13. Condominios Alta Vista
14. Condominios Altos de Torrimar I, II, III, IV, V, y VI
15. Condominios Alturas de Piedras Blancas
16. Condominios Arboleda
17. Condominios Athrium Park (Condominios Santa Paula)
18. Condominios Baldwin Gate
19. Condominios Boulevard del Río I y II
20. Condominios Casa Maggiore
21. Condominios Chalets de Altavista
22. Condominios Égida CIA de P.R.
23. Condominios El Bosque de La Villa de Torrimar
24. Condominios El Bosque
25. Condominios El Palmar de Torrimar
26. Condominios Emerald Court (Mansiones de Esmeralda)
27. Condominios Feliciano
28. Condominios Four Winds
29. Condominios Frailes Norte
30. Condominios Gemini
31. Condominios Granada Park
32. Condominios Hannia María
33. Condominios Hills View Plaza
34. Condominios Jardines de Los Filtros
35. Condominios La Cima
36. Condominios La Ciudadela Nordeste
37. Condominios La Ciudadela
38. Condominios La Villa Gardens
39. Condominios Lincoln Park
40. Condominios Málaga Park
41. Condominios Monte de los Frailes
42. Condominios Monte Palacium
43. Condominios Monte Verde
44. Condominios Montesol
45. Condominios Parkville Plaza
46. Condominios Parque de Los Frailes Town Houses
47. Condominios Parque San Ramón
48. Condominios Plaza de Torrimar I y II
49. Condominios Plaza del Prado
50. Condominios Plaza Esmeralda
51. Condominios Portales de Alhelí
52. Condominios Prados del Monte
53. Condominios Quinta Valle I y II
54. Condominios Regency Park
55. Condominios Ridge Top
56. Condominios San Francisco Javier
57. Condominios San Martín Twin Tower
58. Condominios The Falls
59. Condominios Torre San Miguel
60. Condominios Torremolinos
61. Condominios Torres de los Frailes
62. Condominios Torrimar Plaza
63. Condominios Torrimar Town Park A y B
64. Condominios Villa Cerro Real
65. Condominios Villa de la Fuente
66. Condominios Villa Los Filtros
67. Condominios Villas de Parkville I y II
68. Condominios Vista de los Frailes
69. Condominios Vista La Colina
70. Extensión Muñoz Rivera
71. Hogar Parkville Home Elderly Care Center
72. Reparto Apolo
73. Residencial Rafael Martínez Nadal
74. Residencial Rosaleda
75. Sector Abril Llopiz
76. Sector Casimiro Villegas
77. Sector Cátala
78. Sector El Último Chance (Yambele)
79. Sector La Lomita
80. Sector Las Bombas (Calle Picus)
81. Sector Los Abreu
82. Sector Los Báez
83. Sector Los Burgos
84. Sector Los Caraballo
85. Sector Los Cosme
86. Sector Los Filtros
87. Sector Los García
88. Sector Los Romero
89. Sector Los Tacos
90. Sector Mariquita
91. Sector Meliá
92. Sector Ortiz
93. Sector Peñagarícano
94. Sector Pucho Huertas
95. Sector Valcárcel
96. Urbanización Alto Apolo Estates
97. Urbanización Alto Apolo
98. Urbanización Altos de Torrimar
99. Urbanización Alturas de Torrimar
100. Urbanización Apolo
101. Urbanización Artesia
102. Urbanización Baldwin Park
103. Urbanización Bellomonte
104. Urbanización Bosque de los Frailes
105. Urbanización Casa Linda Village
106. Urbanización Cerro Real
107. Urbanización Chalets de Santa Clara
108. Urbanización Colinas de Parkville
109. Urbanización El Álamo
110. Urbanización El Jardín
111. Urbanización Estancias de Guaynabo
112. Urbanización Estancias de Torrimar
113. Urbanización Estancias del Parque (Villas del Parque)
114. Urbanización Frailes Lomas
115. Urbanización Frailes Norte
116. Urbanización Highland Gardens
117. Urbanización La Lomita
118. Urbanización La Villa de Torrimar
119. Urbanización Las Villas Town Houses
120. Urbanización Las Villas
121. Urbanización Lomas Chalets (Toño Fuentes)
122. Urbanización Los Frailes Sur
123. Urbanización Los Frailes
124. Urbanización Mallorca
125. Urbanización Mansiones de Parkville
126. Urbanización Mansiones de Santa Paula
127. Urbanización Mansiones de Torrimar
128. Urbanización Martin Court
129. Urbanización Monte Alvernia
130. Urbanización Monte Apolo Estate
131. Urbanización Monte Olimpo
132. Urbanización Muñoz Rivera
133. Urbanización Oasis Gardens
134. Urbanización Parkville Court
135. Urbanización Parkville Terrace
136. Urbanización Parkville y Extensión Parkville Town House
137. Urbanización Parque de Torremolinos
138. Urbanización Parque Mediterráneo
139. Urbanización Ponce de León
140. Urbanización Prado Alto
141. Urbanización Quintas de los Frailes
142. Urbanización Quintas de Parkville
143. Urbanización San Francisco Javier
144. Urbanización Santa Clara
145. Urbanización Santiago Iglesias
146. Urbanización Sevilla Biltmore
147. Urbanización Torremolinos Este
148. Urbanización Torremolinos
149. Urbanización Torrimar
150. Urbanización Villa Ávila
151. Urbanización Villa Clementina
152. Urbanización Villa Lissette
153. Urbanización Villa Rita
154. Urbanización Villas de Tívoli
155. Urbanización y Extensión Las Colinas
156. Urbanización y Extensión Santa Paula

=== Guaraguao ===
1. Calle Ceiba
2. Calle Diamante
3. Calle Flamboyán
4. Calle Jazmín
5. Calle La Vega
6. Calle Laguna
7. Calle Manantial
8. Calle Peña
9. Calle Rosado
10. Calle Saturno
11. Parcelas López Caces
12. Sector Benito Guzmán
13. Sector Cabrera
14. Sector Carrillo
15. Sector Corea
16. Sector Elipio Pérez
17. Sector Estrella
18. Sector Figueroa
19. Sector Guerra
20. Sector Juana Ramos
21. Sector La Brecha
22. Sector La Muralla
23. Sector La Vega
24. Sector Landrau
25. Sector Los Báez
26. Sector Los Cintrón
27. Sector Los Lagunas
28. Sector Los Motores
29. Sector Los Sánchez
30. Sector Monte Comunal
31. Sector Peña
32. Sector Puerto Nuevo
33. Sector Romero
34. Sector Villa Isleña
35. Urbanización Nieves Padilla

=== Guaynabo barrio-pueblo ===
1. Barriada Fuentes
2. Barrio Frailes Llano
3. Condominios Altos Reales
4. Condominios Balcones de Guaynabo
5. Condominios Balcones de San Pedro
6. Condominios Chalets del Parque
7. Condominios Monte Mayor
8. Condominios Murano Luxury Apartments
9. Condominios Palmar del Río
10. Condominios Parque Real
11. Condominios Plaza del Palmar
12. Condominios Portal de Sofía
13. Condominios Villas de Guaynabo
14. Hogar Golden Retirement
15. Reparto Piñeiro
16. Residencial Jardines de Guaynabo
17. Residencial Villas de Mabó
18. Sector Cubita
19. Sector Guzmán
20. Sector Honduras
21. Sector Marrero
22. Urbanización Colimar
23. Urbanización Colinas Metropolitanas
24. Urbanización Estancias Reales
25. Urbanización Mansiones de Guaynabo
26. Urbanización Mansiones Reales
27. Urbanización Palma Real
28. Urbanización Quintas Reales
29. Urbanización Reparto Esperanza
30. Urbanización Villas Reales

=== Hato Nuevo ===
1. Brisas del Caribe
2. Calle Paseo de Matilde
3. Calle Santa Ana
4. Camino Los Navarro
5. Camino Sylvia Rodríguez
6. Comunidad Alturas de Lomas de Sol
7. Sector Capó
8. Sector El Coco
9. Sector El Faro
10. Sector El Laberinto
11. Sector Feliciano
12. Sector Hato Nuevo II
13. Sector Inclán
14. Sector Jorge García
15. Sector La Pajilla
16. Sector La Paloma
17. Sector La Vereda
18. Sector Limones
19. Sector Lomas del Sol
20. Sector O’Neill Casañas
21. Sector Valle Las Flores
22. Urbanización Bel-Air
23. Urbanización Colina Mabó
24. Urbanización Finca Elena
25. Urbanización Greenville
26. Urbanización Lomas del Sol
27. Urbanización Mountain View
28. Urbanización Valle Escondido Estates
29. Urbanización Villa Mercedes

=== Mamey ===
1. Barrio Mamey I
2. Calle Domingo González Lugo
3. Sector Antonio González
4. Sector Barrio Mamey II
5. Sector Cancel
6. Sector Carrillo
7. Sector Centeno
8. Sector Félix Urbina
9. Sector Figueroa
10. Sector Garcia
11. Sector Julio Pietro
12. Sector Los Castro
13. Sector Los Lagunas
14. Sector Paso Hondo
15. Sector Pedro Reyes
16. Sector Rivera Rosado

=== Pueblo Viejo ===
1. Apartamentos Gallardo
2. Barriada San Miguel
3. Barriada Vietnam
4. Barrio Juan Domingo
5. Barrio Sabana
6. Buchanan
7. Calle Emilia
8. Calle Flamboyán
9. Calle Pedro Pedroza
10. Calle San Miguel
11. Calle Wilson
12. Callejón Caridad
13. Comunidad Amelia
14. Condominios Acgualina
15. Condominios Amarillys
16. Condominios Arcos de Suchville
17. Condominios Art At San Patricio
18. Condominios Asizi
19. Condominios Bel-Air
20. Condominios Belén
21. Condominios Caparra Chalets
22. Condominios Caparra Classic
23. Condominios Caparra Hills Tower
24. Condominios Caparra Hills Village
25. Condominios Caparra Real
26. Condominios Casa Magna Court
27. Condominios Chalets de Caparra
28. Condominios Ciudad Condor
29. Condominios Colonial Court
30. Condominios Doral Plaza
31. Condominios El Cordovés
32. Condominios El Jardín
33. Condominios El Laurel
34. Condominios Garden Court
35. Condominios Garden Hills Chalets
36. Condominios Garden Hills Plaza I
37. Condominios Garden Hills Plaza II
38. Condominios Garden Hills Tower
39. Condominios Garden Hills Town Park
40. Condominios Garden Hills Villas
41. Condominios Garden Village
42. Condominios Gardenville
43. Condominios Generalife
44. Condominios IL’Villagio
45. Condominios L’Hermitage
46. Condominios Los Caobos Plaza
47. Condominios Los Patricios
48. Condominios Luis Muñoz Marín
49. Condominios Madre Selva
50. Condominios Mansiones de Garden Hills I y II
51. Condominios Mansiones Los Caobos
52. Condominios Meadows Towers
53. Condominios Milan Court
54. Condominios Miradores de Sabana
55. Condominios Novas Court Town Houses
56. Condominios Palm Circle
57. Condominios Park Royal
58. Condominios Parkside
59. Condominios Parque de Villa Caparra
60. Condominios Parque San Patricio I y II
61. Condominios Pisos de Caparra
62. Condominios Plaza Athenne
63. Condominios Plaza Real Caparra
64. Condominios Ponce de León
65. Condominios Portales de San Patricio
66. Condominios Porto Fino
67. Condominios Saint Morritz
68. Condominios San Patricio Apartamentos
69. Condominios San Patricio Chalets
70. Condominios San Patricio I y II
71. Condominios San Patricio Meadows
72. Condominios Santa Ana
73. Condominios Suchville Park
74. Condominios The Village At Suchville
75. Condominios The Village
76. Condominios Torres de Caparra
77. Condominios Town Houses Villa Caparra
78. Condominios Vía Caparra
79. Condominios Villa Caparra Court
80. Condominios Villa Caparra Executive
81. Condominios Villa Caparra Plaza
82. Condominios Villa Caparra Tower
83. Condominios Villa Caparra Town Park
84. Hogar San José de la Montaña
85. Residencial Zenón Díaz Valcárcel
86. Sector Buen Samaritano
87. Sector Fondo del Saco
88. Sector Jerusalén
89. Sector La Esperanza
90. Sector Robles
91. Urbanización Alturas de San Patricio
92. Urbanización Arboleda
93. Urbanización Balcones de Sevilla
94. Urbanización Caparra Hills
95. Urbanización Caparra Town Park
96. Urbanización Chalets de la Reina
97. Urbanización Garden Hills Estate
98. Urbanización Garden Hills
99. Urbanización Georgetown
100. Urbanización Golden Gate
101. Urbanización Los Caobos Apartamentos
102. Urbanización Los Caobos
103. Urbanización Mansiones de Garden Hills
104. Urbanización Mansiones de Tintillo
105. Urbanización Parkside
106. Urbanización Parque de Villa Caparra
107. Urbanización Parque San Patricio
108. Urbanización San Patricio
109. Urbanización Suchville
110. Urbanización Sunset Harbor
111. Urbanización Susan Court
112. Urbanización Terrazas de Tintillo
113. Urbanización Tintillo Gardens
114. Urbanización Tintillo Hills
115. Urbanización Tintillo
116. Urbanización Town House San Patricio
117. Urbanización Villa Concepción 1 y 2
118. Urbanización Villa de Flamboyán
119. Urbanización Villa Elsie
120. Urbanización Villa Trujillo
121. Urbanización Villa Verde
122. Urbanización Villas de Tintillo
123. Urbanización Y Extensión Villa Caparra
124. Víctor Braegger

=== Río ===
1. Calle La 245
2. Calle Los García
3. Camino Avelino López
4. Camino Susano Rodríguez
5. Condominios Beverly Hills Court
6. Egida Asociación Miembros de la Policía
7. Sector Casa Rest Manor
8. Sector El 24
9. Sector El Laberinto
10. Sector Gavillán
11. Sector La Curva
12. Sector La Muda
13. Sector La Palmita
14. Sector Los Canarios
15. Sector Los González y Hernández
16. Sector Los Villega
17. Sector Pedro Ramos
18. Sector Tomé
19. Sector Vallae Verde
20. Urbanización Beverly Hills
21. Urbanización Carmen Hills
22. Urbanización Linda Gardens
23. Urbanización Quintas de Beverly Hills
24. Urbanización Sunset Hills

=== Santa Rosa ===
1. Barrio Santa Rosa I
2. Barrio Santa Rosa II
3. Barrio Santa Rosa III
4. Calle Buenos Aires
5. Calle Cándido Montijo
6. Calle del Parque
7. Calle El Nuevo Horizonte
8. Calle Flamboyán
9. Calle Jardines
10. Calle Monserrate
11. Calle Reymundí
12. Camino Juanillo Fuentes
13. Condominios D’ Villas
14. Condominios Grand View
15. Condominios Parque de Terranova
16. Condominios Pórticos de Guaynabo
17. Condominios Villa Providencia
18. Parcelas Huertas
19. Reparto Sector Villegas
20. Sector As de Oro
21. Sector Augusto Báez
22. Sector Campo Alegre
23. Sector Canta Gallo
24. Sector Cortijo
25. Sector El Hoyo
26. Sector El Junker
27. Sector El Llano
28. Sector Gavillán Rivera
29. Sector La Trinchera
30. Sector Las Bombas
31. Sector Las Torres
32. Sector Los Báez
33. Sector Los Burgos
34. Sector Los Chinea
35. Sector Los López
36. Sector Los Marrero
37. Sector Los Nazario
38. Sector Los Ortegas
39. Sector Los Pérez
40. Sector Los Rentas
41. Sector Los Resto
42. Sector Lozada
43. Sector Marta Ortiz
44. Sector Moreno
45. Sector Negrón
46. Sector Rivera
47. Sector Rodríguez
48. Sector Varela
49. Sector Villa del Río
50. Urbanización Camino del Monte
51. Urbanización Colinas de Guaynabo
52. Urbanización La Fontana
53. Urbanización Las Rambas in Downtown
54. Urbanización Monte Cielo
55. Urbanización Riberas de Honduras
56. Urbanización Riverside
57. Urbanización Sierra Berdecía
58. Urbanización Terranova
59. Urbanización Vistas del Río
60. Urbanización Y Extensión Terrazas de Guaynabo
61. Vistas de Guaynabo

=== Sonadora ===
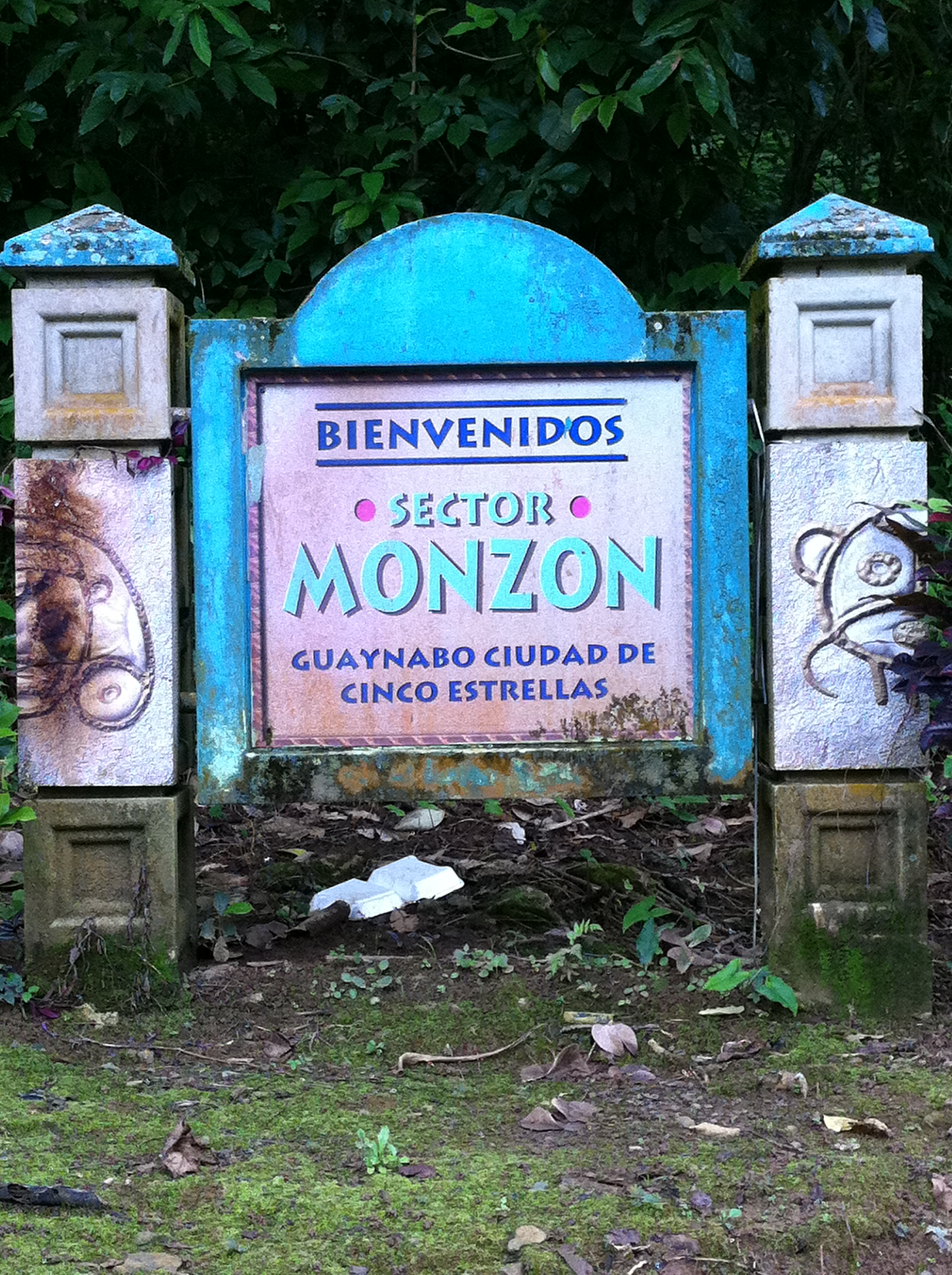
Sign for Monzon in Sonadora

1. Carretera 174 (from km 13.4 to km 16.4)
2. Sector Antonio Báez
3. Sector El Alto
4. Sector El Gato
5. Sector Gilo Maldonado
6. Sector La Marquesa
7. Sector Las Parcelas
8. Sector Los Díaz
9. Sector Los Pérez
10. Sector Monzón
11. Sector Pueblo Viejo
12. Sector Sonadora Alta
13. Sector Sonadora Llana
14. Sector Toño Báez
15. Sector Viña

== See also ==
- List of communities in Puerto Rico
