= Hato Nuevo, Guaynabo, Puerto Rico =

Barrio of Puerto Rico

Hato Nuevo
- Barrio
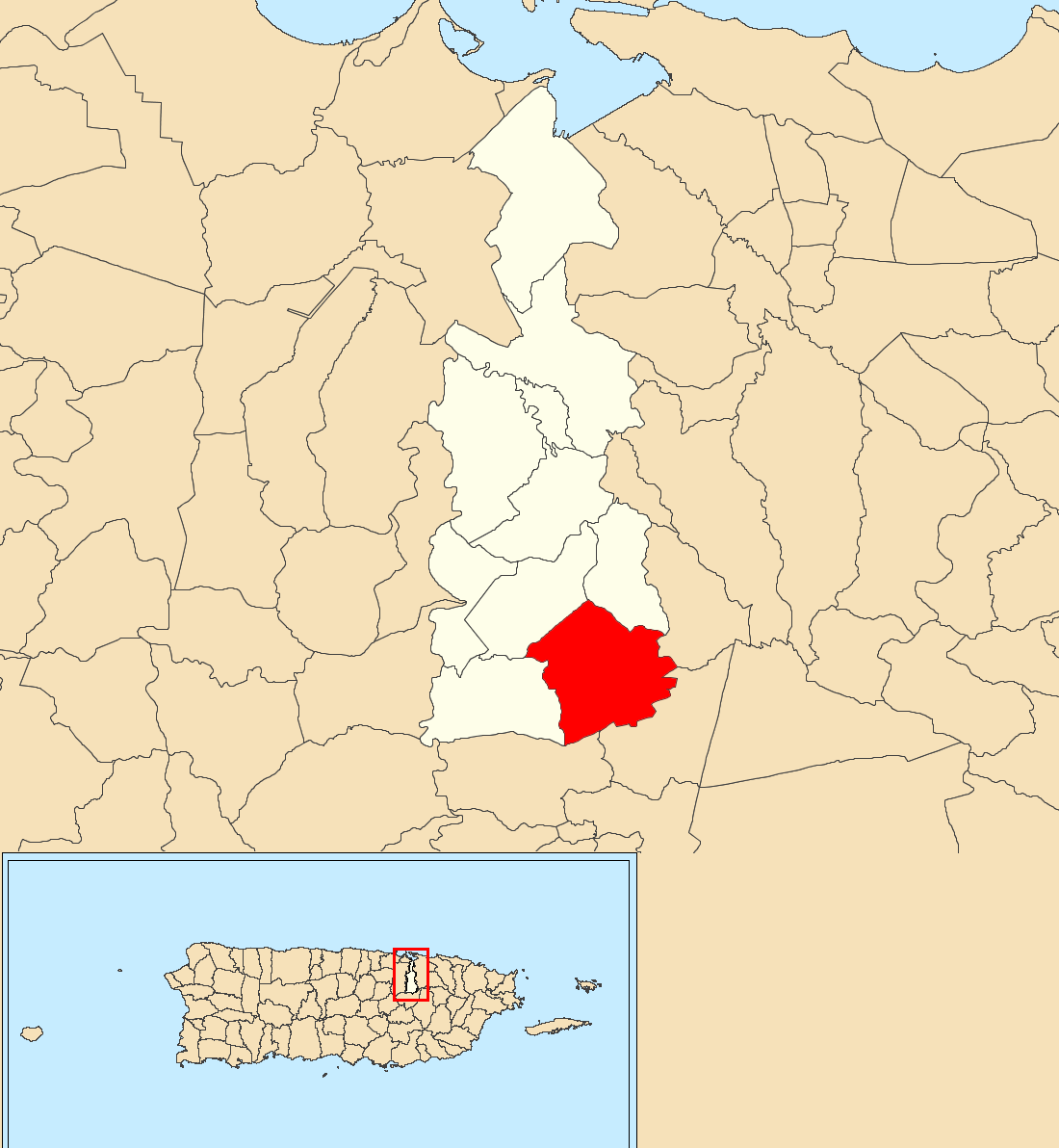
- Location of Hato Nuevo within the municipality of Guaynabo shown in red

- Location of Puerto Rico
- Coordinates: 18°17′41″N 66°05′59″W
- Commonwealth: Puerto Rico
- Municipality: Guaynabo

Area
  - Total: 3.49 sq mi (9.0 km^{2})
  - Land: 3.48 sq mi (9.0 km^{2})
  - Water: 0.01 sq mi (0.026 km^{2})
- Elevation: 574 ft (175 m)

Population (2010)
  - Total: 4,114
  - Density: 1,182.2/sq mi (456.4/km^{2})
- Source: 2010 Census
- Time zone: UTC−4 (AST)

Hato Nuevo is a barrio in the municipality of Guaynabo, Puerto Rico. Its population in 2010 was 4,114.

== Demographics ==
Historical population
Census	Pop.	Note	%±
1910	877		—
1920	1,058		20.6%
1930	975		−7.8%
1940	1,094		12.2%
1950	1,213		10.9%
1960	1,393		14.8%
1970	1,666		19.6%
1980	2,195		31.8%
1990	3,198		45.7%
2000	3,115		−2.6%
2010	4,114		32.1%
U.S. Decennial Census; 1899 (shown as 1900) 1910-1930; 1930-1950 1980-2000 2010

== Hurricane Maria ==
Hurricane Maria, the deadly Category 5 hurricane that struck Puerto Rico on September 20, 2017, caused flooding and damaged infrastructure in Hato Nuevo. A bridge to replace a collapsed bridge in Hato Nuevo was completed and inaugurated on February 14, 2019, nearly a year and a half later.

== Sectors ==
Barrios (which are, in contemporary times, roughly comparable to minor civil divisions) in turn are further subdivided into smaller local populated place areas/units called sectores (sectors in English). The types of sectores may vary, from normally sector to urbanización to reparto to barriada to residencial, among others.

The following sectors are in Hato Nuevo barrio:

Brisas del Caribe, Calle Paseo de Matilde, Calle Santa Ana, Camino Los Navarro, Camino Sylvia Rodríguez, Comunidad Alturas de Lomas de Sol, Sector Capó, Sector El Coco, Sector El Faro, Sector El Laberinto, Sector Feliciano, Sector Hato Nuevo II, Sector Inclán, Sector Jorge García, Sector La Pajilla, Sector La Paloma, Sector La Vereda, Sector Limones, Sector Lomas del Sol, Sector O’Neill Casañas, Sector Valle Las Flores, Urbanización Bel-Air, Urbanización Colina Mabó, Urbanización Finca Elena, Urbanización Greenville, Urbanización Lomas del Sol, Urbanización Mountain View, Urbanización Valle Escondido Estates, and Urbanización Villa Mercedes.

== See also ==
- List of communities in Puerto Rico
- List of barrios and sectors of Guaynabo, Puerto Rico
