= Río, Guaynabo, Puerto Rico =

Barrio of Puerto Rico

Río
- Barrio
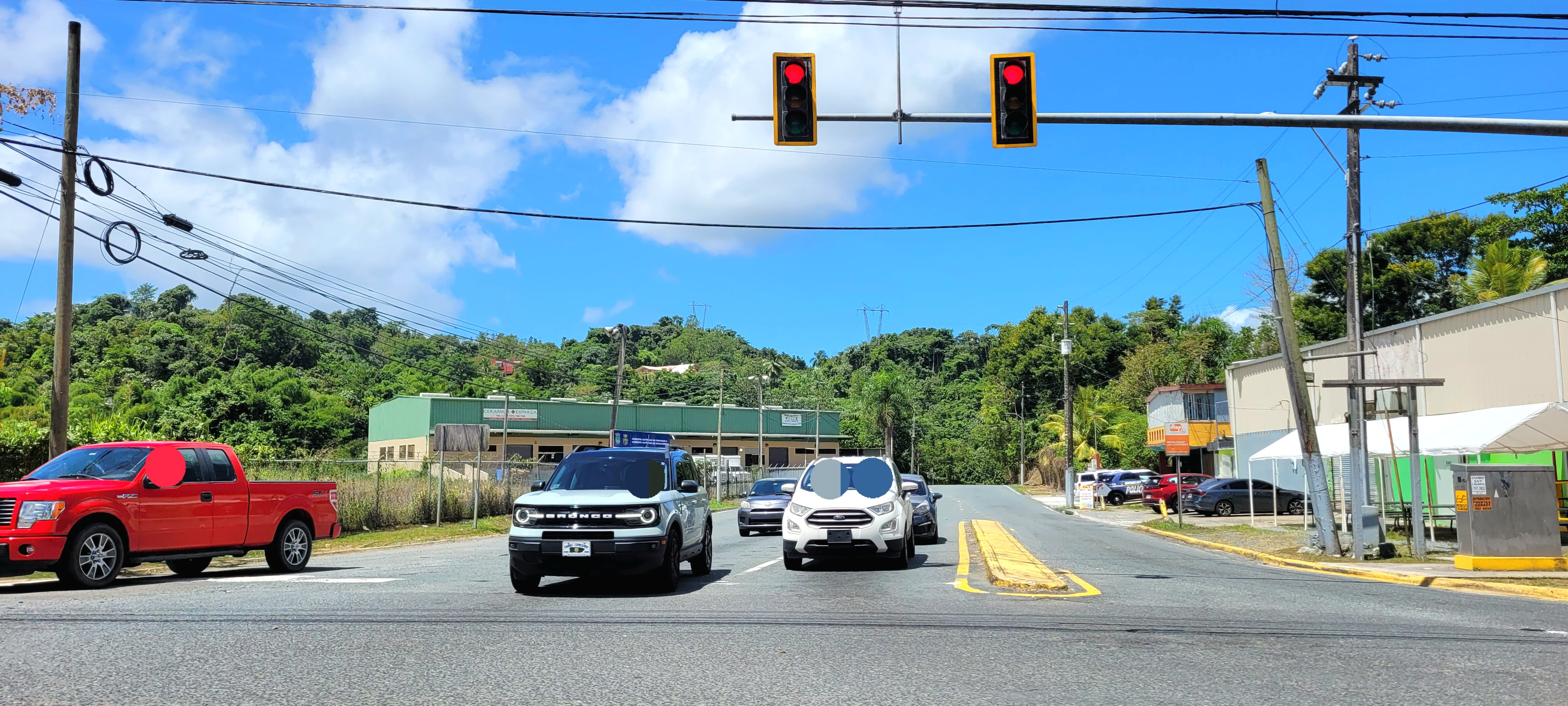
- Puerto Rico Highway 173 in Río

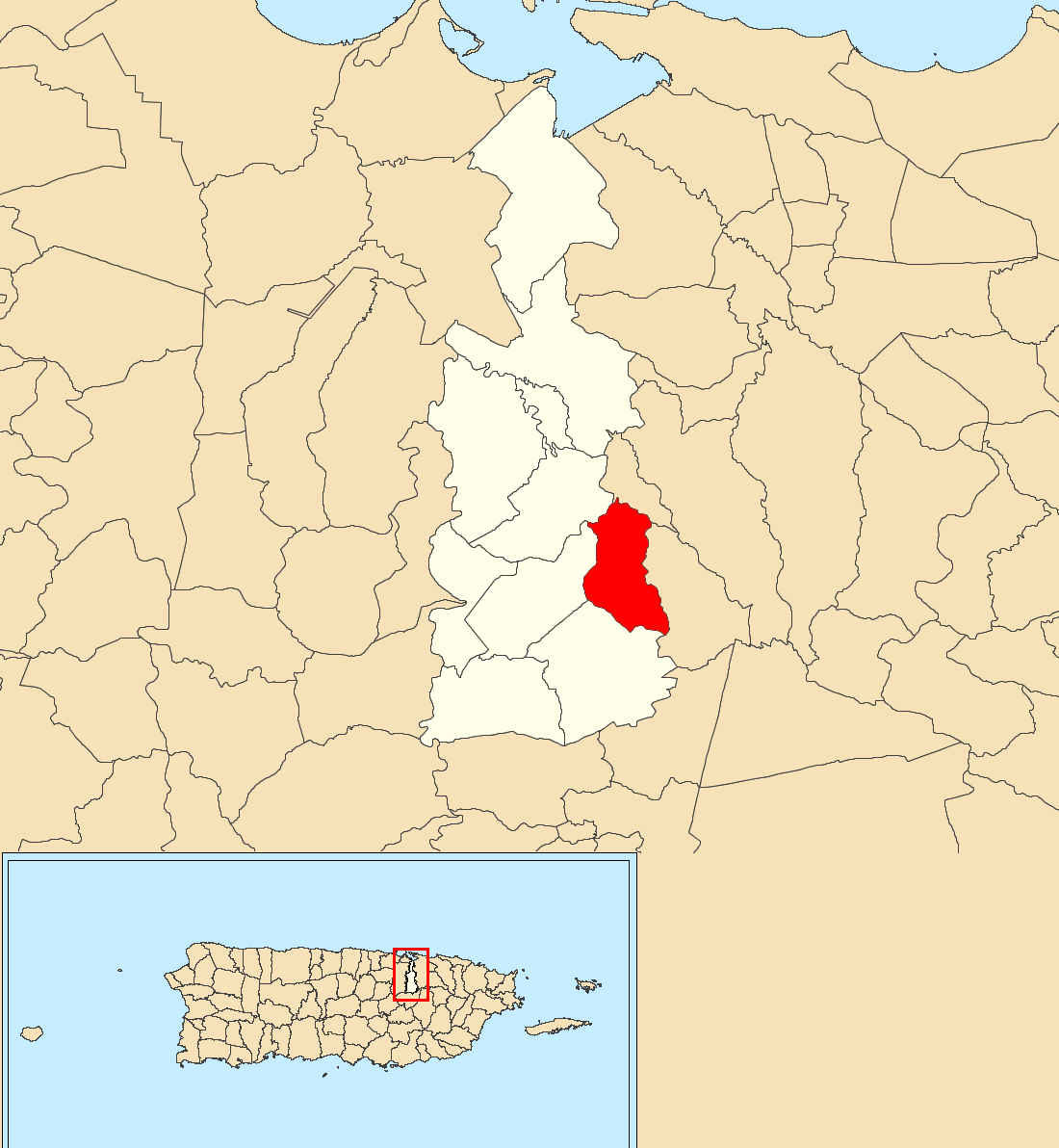
- Location of Río within the municipality of Guaynabo shown in red

- Location of Puerto Rico
- Coordinates: 18°19′17″N 66°05′34″W
- Commonwealth: Puerto Rico
- Municipality: Guaynabo

Area
  - Total: 1.87 sq mi (4.8 km^{2})
  - Land: 1.87 sq mi (4.8 km^{2})
  - Water: 0 sq mi (0 km^{2})
- Elevation: 469 ft (143 m)

Population
  - Total: 2,791
  - Density: 1,492.5/sq mi (576.3/km^{2})
- Source: 2010 Census
- Time zone: UTC−4 (AST)

Río is a barrio in the municipality of Guaynabo, Puerto Rico. Its population in 2010 was 2,791.

Historical population
Census	Pop.	Note	%±
1910	717		—
1920	948		32.2%
1930	1,247		31.5%
1940	1,301		4.3%
1950	1,574		21.0%
1960	2,067		31.3%
1970	2,472		19.6%
1980	2,567		3.8%
1990	2,782		8.4%
2000	2,811		1.0%
2010	2,791		−0.7%
U.S. Decennial Census; 1899 (shown as 1900) 1910-1930; 1930-1950 1980-2000 2010

== Sectors ==
Barrios (which are, in contemporary times, roughly comparable to minor civil divisions) in turn are further subdivided into smaller local populated place areas/units called sectores (sectors in English). The types of sectores may vary, from normally sector to urbanización to reparto to barriada to residencial, among others.

The following sectors are in Río barrio:

Calle La 245, Calle Los García, Camino Avelino López, Camino Susano Rodríguez, Condominios Beverly Hills Court, Egida Asociación Miembros de la Policía, Sector Casa Rest Manor, Sector El 24, Sector El Laberinto, Sector Gavillán, Sector La Curva, Sector La Muda, Sector La Palmita, Sector Los Canarios, Sector Los González y Hernández, Sector Los Villega, Sector Pedro Ramos, Sector Tomé, Sector Vallae Verde, Urbanización Beverly Hills, Urbanización Carmen Hills, Urbanización Linda Gardens, Urbanización Quintas de Beverly Hills, and Urbanización Sunset Hills.

== See also ==
- List of communities in Puerto Rico
- List of barrios and sectors of Guaynabo, Puerto Rico
