= Sonadora, Guaynabo, Puerto Rico =

Barrio of Puerto Rico

Sonadora
- Barrio
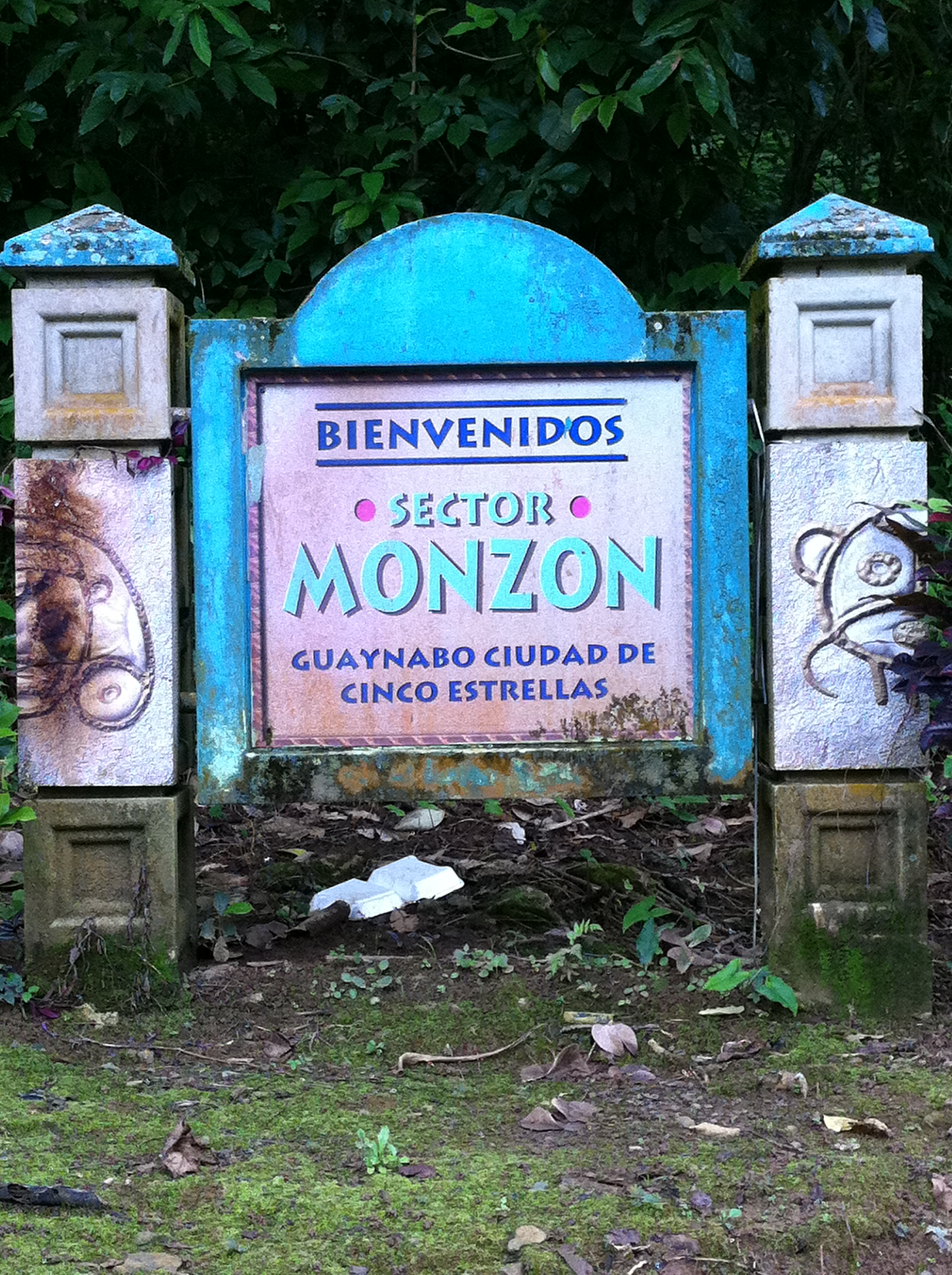
- Sign for Sector Monzon in Sonadora

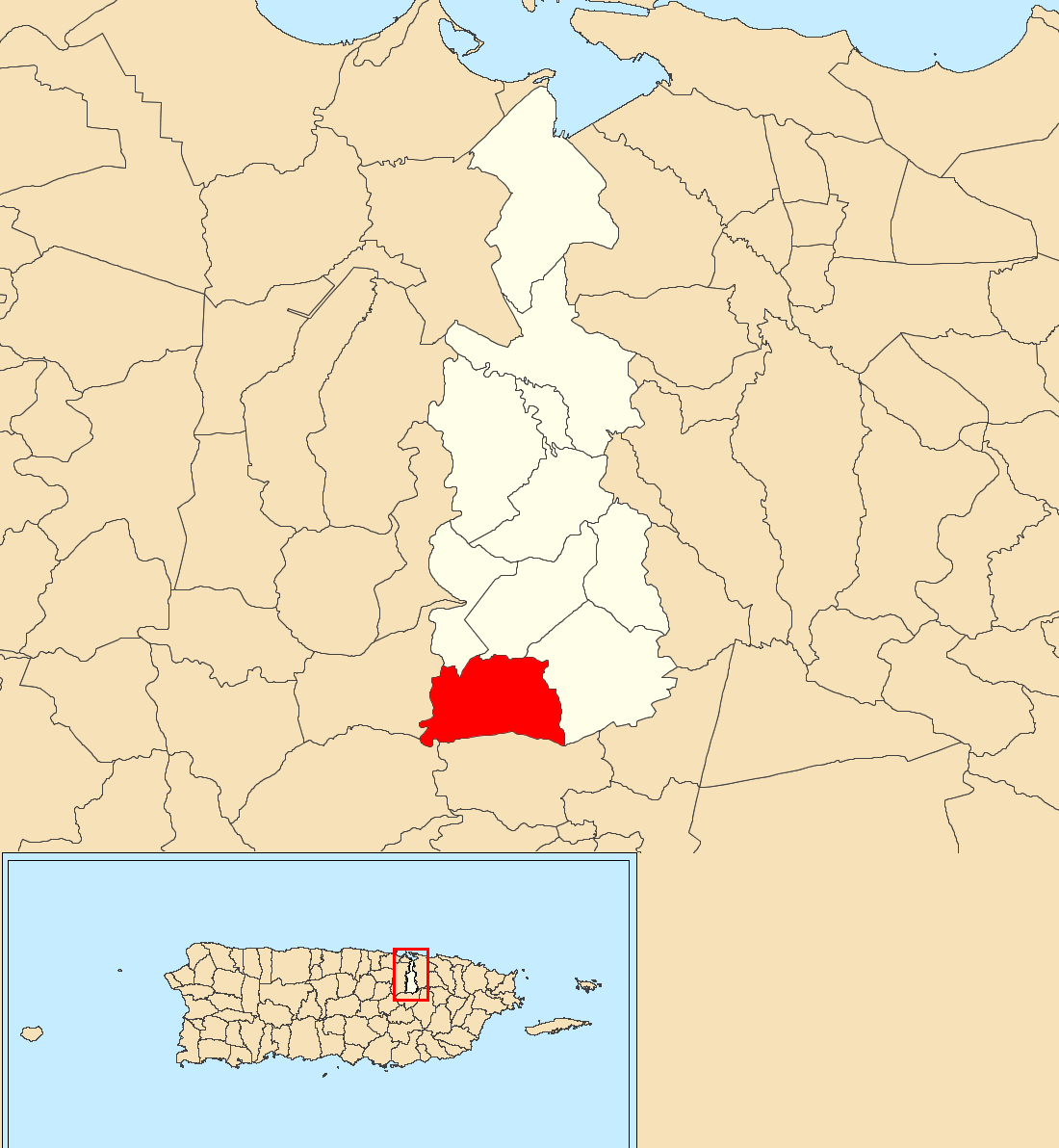
- Location of Sonadora within the municipality of Guaynabo shown in red

- Location of Puerto Rico
- Coordinates: 18°17′20″N 66°07′32″W
- Commonwealth: Puerto Rico
- Municipality: Guaynabo

Area
  - Total: 2.61 sq mi (6.8 km^{2})
  - Land: 2.61 sq mi (6.8 km^{2})
  - Water: 0 sq mi (0 km^{2})
- Elevation: 597 ft (182 m)

Population (2010)
  - Total: 1,334
  - Density: 511.1/sq mi (197.3/km^{2})
- Source: 2010 Census
- Time zone: UTC−4 (AST)

Sonadora is a barrio in the municipality of Guaynabo, Puerto Rico. Its population in 2010 was 1,334.

== History ==
Sonadora was in Spain's gazetteers until Puerto Rico was ceded by Spain in the aftermath of the Spanish–American War under the terms of the Treaty of Paris of 1898 and became an unincorporated territory of the United States. In 1899, the United States Department of War conducted a census of Puerto Rico finding that the population of Sonadora barrio was 729.

Historical population
Census	Pop.	Note	%±
1900	729		—
1910	654		−10.3%
1920	909		39.0%
1930	1,061		16.7%
1940	1,143		7.7%
1950	941		−17.7%
1960	1,005		6.8%
1970	970		−3.5%
1980	717		−26.1%
1990	1,157		61.4%
2000	1,337		15.6%
2010	1,334		−0.2%
U.S. Decennial Census; 1899 (shown as 1900) 1910-1930; 1930-1950 1980-2000 2010

== Sectors ==
Barrios (which are, in contemporary times, roughly comparable to minor civil divisions) in turn are further subdivided into smaller local populated place areas/units called sectores (sectors in English). The types of sectores may vary, from normally sector to urbanización to reparto to barriada to residencial, among others.

The following sectors are in Sonadora barrio:

A section of Puerto Rico Highway 174 (from km 13.4 to km 16.4), Sector Antonio Báez, Sector El Alto, Sector El Gato, Sector Gilo Maldonado, Sector La Marquesa, Sector Las Parcelas, Sector Los Díaz, Sector Los Pérez, Sector Monzón, Sector Pueblo Viejo, Sector Sonadora Alta, Sector Sonadora Llana, Sector Toño Báez, and Sector Viña.

== See also ==
- List of communities in Puerto Rico
- List of barrios and sectors of Guaynabo, Puerto Rico
