= Santa Rosa, Guaynabo, Puerto Rico =

Barrio of Puerto Rico

Santa Rosa
- Barrio
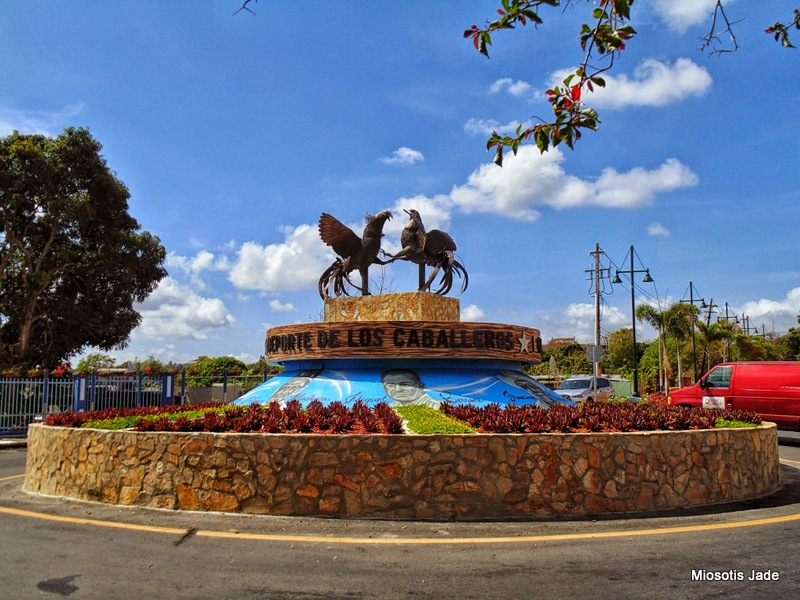
- Circle in Sector Canta Gallo in Santa Rosa

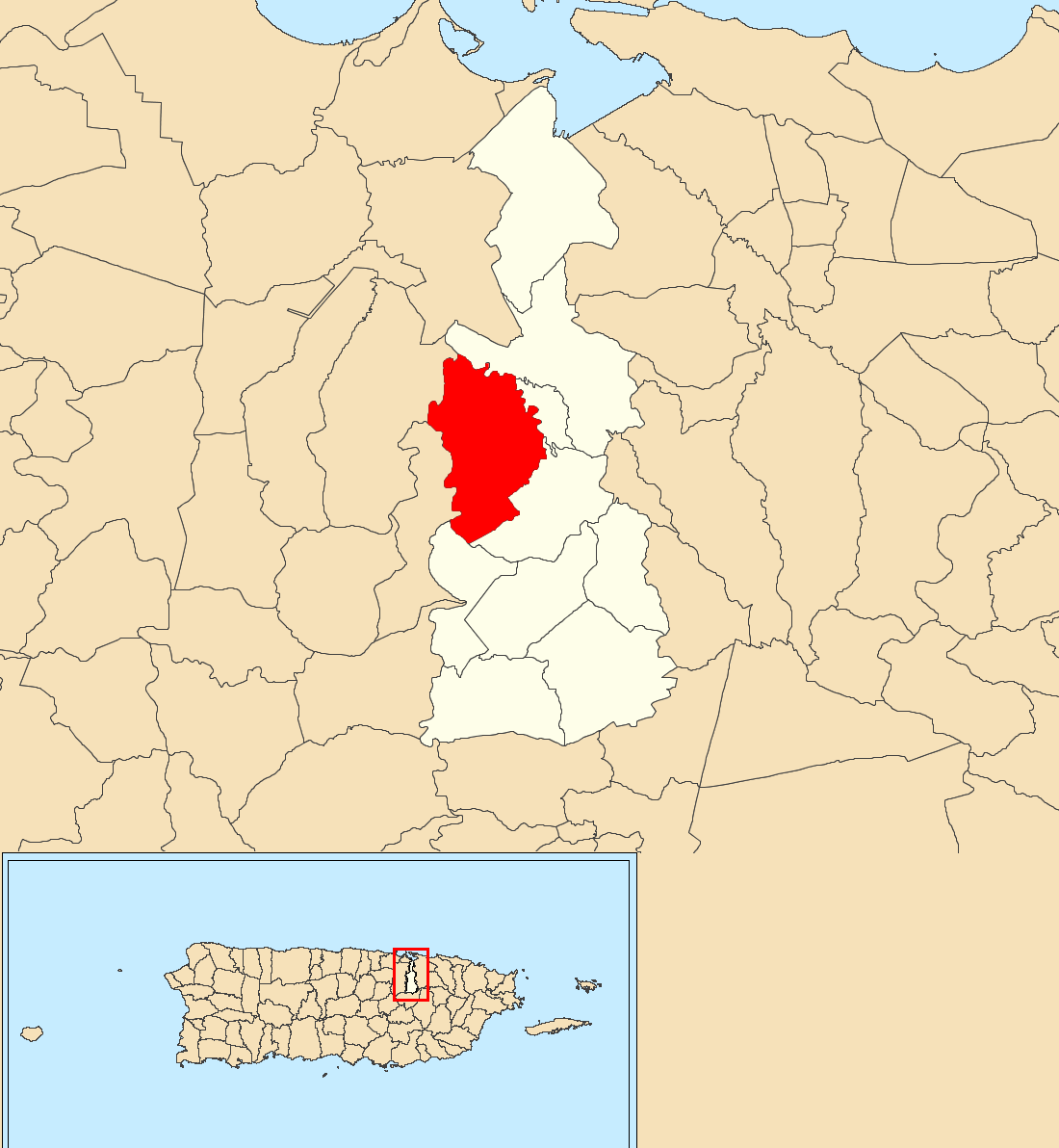
- Location of Santa Rosa within the municipality of Guaynabo shown in red

- Location of Puerto Rico
- Coordinates: 18°21′04″N 66°07′37″W
- Commonwealth: Puerto Rico
- Municipality: Guaynabo

Area
  - Total: 3.71 sq mi (9.6 km^{2})
  - Land: 3.68 sq mi (9.5 km^{2})
  - Water: 0.03 sq mi (0.078 km^{2})
- Elevation: 266 ft (81 m)

Population (2010)
  - Total: 16,904
  - Density: 4,593.5/sq mi (1,773.6/km^{2})
- Source: 2010 Census
- Time zone: UTC−4 (AST)

Santa Rosa is a barrio in the municipality of Guaynabo, Puerto Rico. Its population in 2010 was 16,904.

== History ==
Santa Rosa was in Spain's gazetteers until Puerto Rico was ceded by Spain in the aftermath of the Spanish–American War under the terms of the Treaty of Paris of 1898 and became an unincorporated territory of the United States. In 1899, the United States Department of War conducted a census of Puerto Rico finding that the population of Santa Rosa barrio was 687.

Historical population
Census	Pop.	Note	%±
1900	687		—
1910	811		18.0%
1920	1,200		48.0%
1930	1,470		22.5%
1940	1,828		24.4%
1950	2,057		12.5%
1960	2,751		33.7%
1970	0		−100.0%
1980	8,072		—
1990	11,985		48.5%
2000	16,981		41.7%
2010	16,904		−0.5%
U.S. Decennial Census; 1899 (shown as 1900) 1910-1930; 1930-1950 1980-2000 2010

== Sectors ==
Barrios (which are, in contemporary times, roughly comparable to minor civil divisions) in turn are further subdivided into smaller local populated place areas/units called sectores (sectors in English). The types of sectores may vary, from normally sector to urbanización to reparto to barriada to residencial, among others.

The following sectors are in Santa Rosa barrio:

Barrio Santa Rosa I, Barrio Santa Rosa II, Barrio Santa Rosa III, Calle Buenos Aires, Calle Cándido Montijo, Calle del Parque, Calle El Nuevo Horizonte, Calle Flamboyán, Calle Jardines, Calle Monserrate, Calle Reymundí, Camino Juanillo Fuentes, Condominios D’ Villas, Condominios Grand View, Condominios Parque de Terranova, Condominios Pórticos de Guaynabo, Condominios Villa Providencia, Parcelas Huertas, Reparto Sector Villegas, Sector As de Oro, Sector Augusto Báez, Sector Campo Alegre, Sector Canta Gallo, Sector Cortijo, Sector El Hoyo, Sector El Junker, Sector El Llano, Sector Gavillán Rivera, Sector La Trinchera, Sector Las Bombas (Excepto Calle Ficus), Sector Las Torres, Sector Los Báez, Sector Los Burgos, Sector Los Chinea, Sector Los López, Sector Los Marrero, Sector Los Nazario, Sector Los Ortegas, Sector Los Pérez, Sector Los Rentas, Sector Los Resto, Sector Lozada, Sector Marta Ortiz, Sector Moreno, Sector Negrón, Sector Rivera, Sector Rodríguez, Sector Varela, Sector Villa del Río, Urbanización Camino del Monte, Urbanización Colinas de Guaynabo, Urbanización La Fontana, Urbanización Las Rambas in Downtown, Urbanización Monte Cielo, Urbanización Riberas de Honduras, Urbanización Riverside, Urbanización Sierra Berdecía, Urbanización Terranova, Urbanización Vistas del Río, Urbanización Y Extensión Terrazas de Guaynabo, and Vistas de Guaynabo.

== Gallery ==
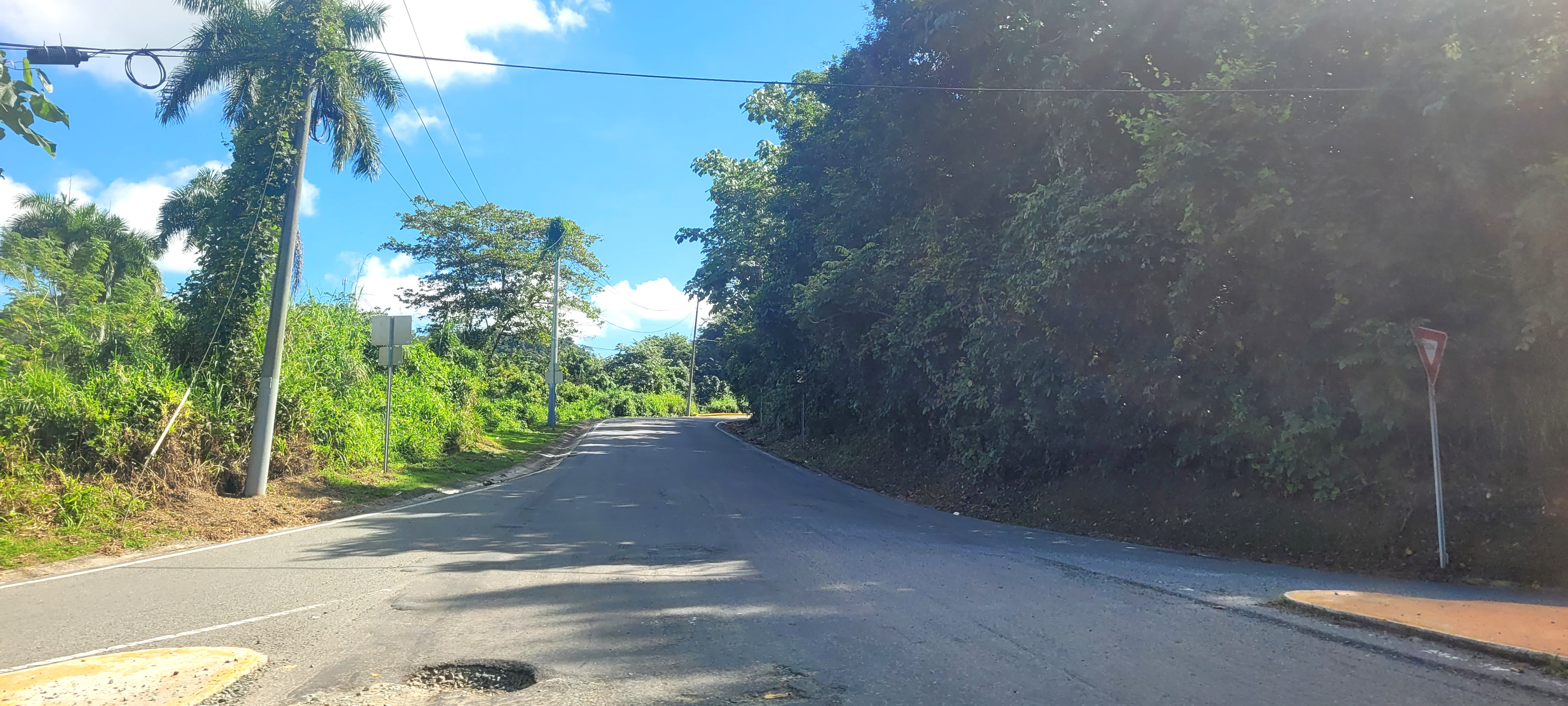
Puerto Rico Highway 836 in Santa Rosa

== See also ==
- List of communities in Puerto Rico
- List of barrios and sectors of Guaynabo, Puerto Rico
