= Diego de Torres Vargas =

Wrote first book about the history of Puerto Rico

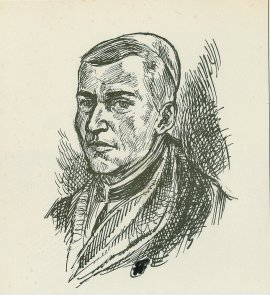
- Father Diego de Torres Vargas
- Born: 1615; San Juan, Puerto Rico
- Died: 1670 (aged 54–55); San Juan, Puerto Rico
- Occupation: priest
- Writing career
- Notable work: Descripción de la Ciudad e Isla de Puerto Rico

Diego de Torres Vargas (1615 – 1670) was a Puerto Rican Catholic priest, and the first person to write a comprehensive history of Puerto Rico.

== Early years ==
Torres Vargas was born in San Juan, Puerto Rico, to a prosperous family. His father, Garcia de la Torre, was a Sergeant Mayor in the Spanish Army who died while fighting alongside Captain Juan de Amézqueta against Captain Balduino Enrico (Boudewijn Hendricksz), leader of the Dutch armada, who attempted to invade the island, in the Battle of San Juan of 1625.

== Academic education ==
Torres Vargas studied and graduated from the University of Salamanca in Spain where he earned his degree in Theology and Canon law. He returned to Puerto Rico where he was ordained a priest. King Philip IV appointed him to various positions in the Cathedral of San Juan including the position of Dean of said institution. Later Torres Vargas, became the secretary of the Bishop of San Juan, Haro Damian Lopez.

== Description of the Island and City of Puerto Rico ==
In 1647 he wrote "Descripción de la Ciudad e Isla de Puerto Rico" ("Description of the Island and City of Puerto Rico"). This historical book was the first to make a detailed geographic description of the island.

The book described all the fruits and commercial establishments. It also listed and described every mine, church, and hospital in the island at the time. The book contained notices on the State and Capital, plus an extensive and erudite bibliography. This is considered to be the first organized history of Puerto Rico written by a Puerto Rican. Diego de la Torre de Vargas died in San Juan, Puerto Rico in 1670

== Coat of arms of San Juan ==
Coat of arms of San Juan

Spanish rule

Current

On March 8, 1948, the city of San Juan officially adopted as the city's first flag a white field, in the center of which is the current coat of arms of the city.

The flag is based on Father Diego de Torres Vargas' text and it reads: "Escudo de armas dado a Puerto Rico por los Reyes Católicos en el año de 1511, siendo Procurador un vecino llamado Pedro Moreno. Son: un cordero blanco con su banderilla colorada, sobre un libro, y todo sobre una isla verde, que es la de Puerto Rico, y por los lados una F y una I, que quiere decir Fernando e Isabel, los Reyes Católicos que se las dieron, y hoy se conservan en el estandarte real, que es de damasco anaranjado, con que se ganó la ciudad" ("coat of arms given to Puerto Rico by the Catholic Monarchs in the year 1511 when a vecino (roughly "freeman") named Pedro Moreno was Procurator. They are: a white lamb with its red flag, on top of a book, and everything above a green island, which is Puerto Rico...which is an orange damask, with which the city was won").

It appears that this orange was changed to white at some point.

== See also ==
- List of Puerto Rican writers
- List of Puerto Ricans
- Puerto Rican literature
- Coat of arms of Puerto Rico
