= Juan de Amézqueta =

17th-century Spanish Puerto Rican military officer

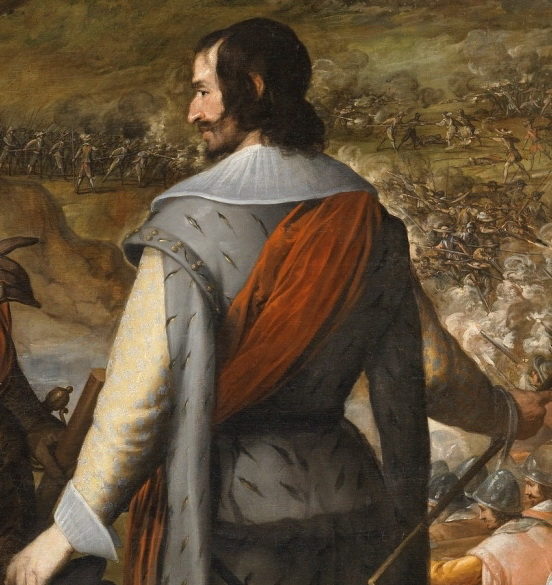
- Captain Juan de Amézqueta
- Born: 1595; San Sebastián, Gipuzkoa Province, Spain, Spanish Empire
- Died: San Juan, Puerto Rico, Spanish Empire
- Military career
- Allegiance: Spanish Puerto Rican Militia
- Rank: Captain
- Commands: San Felipe del Morro Castle
- Conflicts: Defense of San Juan (1625)

Juan de Amézqueta (born c. 1595) was a Spanish captain in the Puerto Rican Militia who defended Puerto Rico from an invasion by the Dutch in 1625. He fought and wounded Captain Balduino Enrico (Boudewijn Hendricksz) who was ordered by the Dutch Government to capture Puerto Rico.

== Early years ==
Amezqueta (birth name: Juan de Amézqueta y Quijano) was born and raised in the town of San Sebastián, Gipuzkoa Province, Spain.

== Defense of San Juan ==
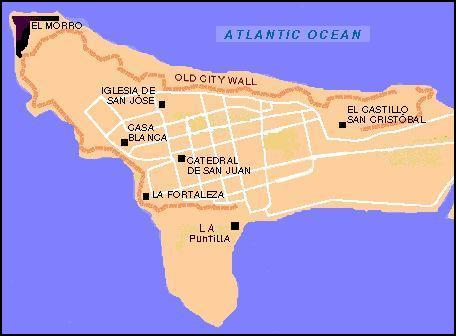
Area where the "Battle of San Juan of 1625" took place

The Netherlands was a world military and commercial power by 1625, competing in the Caribbean Sea. The Dutch wanted to establish a military stronghold in the area, and dispatched Captain Balduino Enrico (also known as Boudewijn Hendricksz or Bowdoin Henrick) to capture Puerto Rico. On September 24, 1625, Enrico arrived at the coast of San Juan with 17 ships and 2,000 men and sent a message to the governor of Puerto Rico, Juan de Haro, ordering him to surrender the island. De Haro refused; he was an experienced military man and expected an attack in the section known as Boqueron. He therefore had that area fortified. However, the Dutch took another route and landed in La Puntilla.

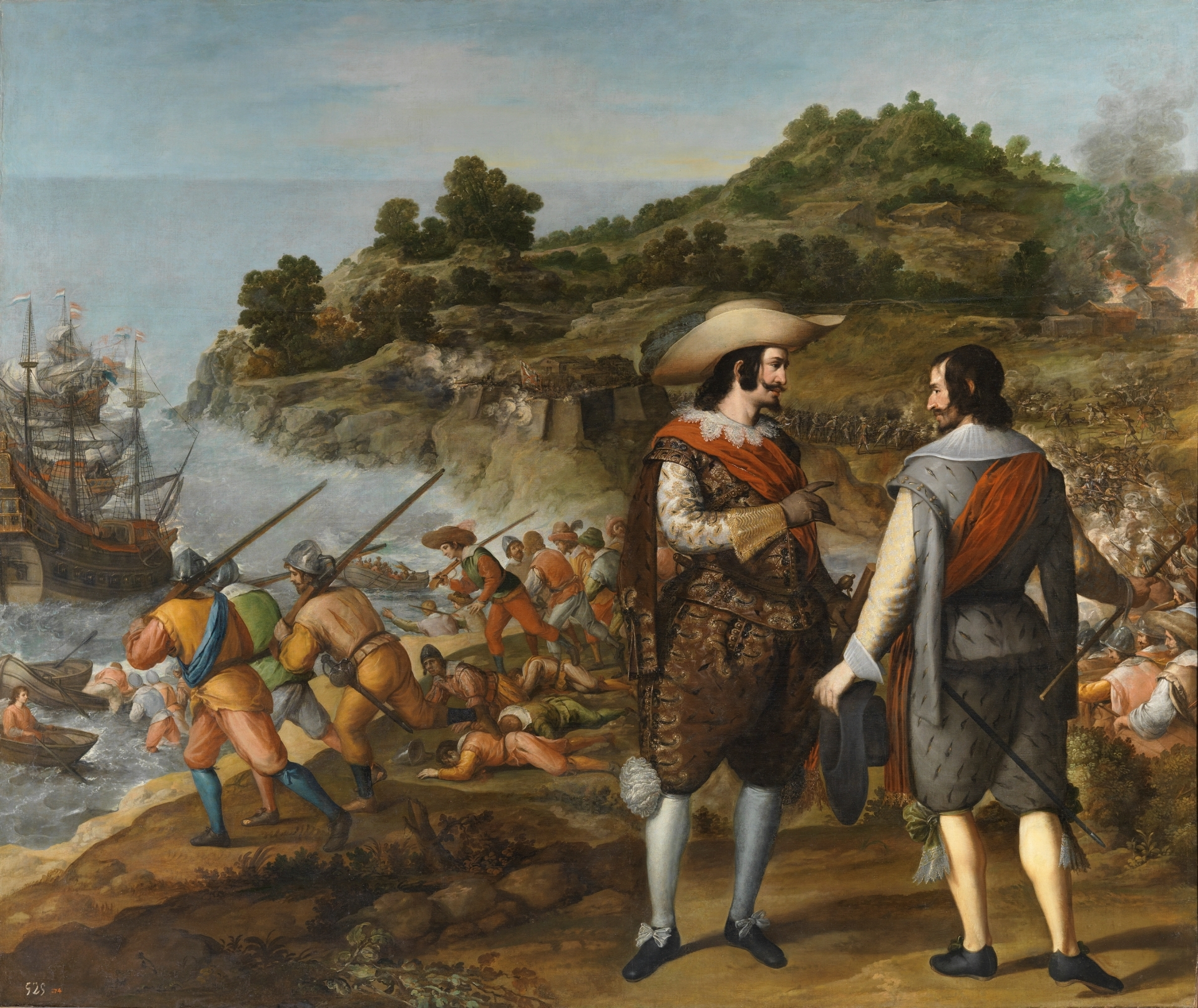
Seventeenth-century Spanish painting commemorating Enrico's defeat at San Juan de Puerto Rico; by Eugenio Caxés, 1634–35, Museo del Prado

De Haro realized that an invasion was inevitable and ordered Captain Juan de Amezqueta, plus 300 men stationed at "San Felipe del Morro Castle" (also known as "El Morro") and the city of San Juan evacuated. He also had former governor Juan de Vargas organize an armed resistance in the interior of the island. On September 25 Enrico attacked San Juan, besieging El Morro Castle and La Fortaleza (the Governor's Mansion). He invaded the capital city and set up his headquarters in La Fortaleza. The Dutch were counterattacked by Captain Juan de Amezqueta and 50 members of the civilian militia on land and by the cannons of the Spanish troops in El Morro Castle. The land battle left 60 Dutch soldiers dead and Enrico with a sword wound to his neck which he received from the hands of Amezqueta, who was considered one of the best swordsmen on the island.

The Dutch ships at sea were boarded by the Puerto Ricans who defeated the Dutch in the land battle. After a long battle, the Spanish soldiers and volunteers of the city's militia were able to defend the city from the attack and save the island from an invasion. On October 21, Enrico set La Fortaleza and the city ablaze. Captains Amezqueta and Andre Botello decided to put a stop to the destruction and led 200 men in an attack against the enemy's front and rear guard. They drove Enrico and his men from their trenches and into the ocean in their haste to reach their ships.

Enrico, upon his retreat, would leave behind him one of his largest ships stranded and over 400 of his men dead. He then tried to invade the island by attacking the town of Aguada. He was again defeated by the local militia and abandoned the idea of invading Puerto Rico.

== Later years ==
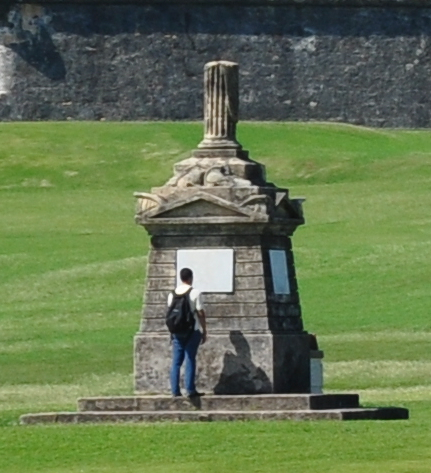
Monument at El Morro honoring Capt. Juan de Amézqueta

Captain Amezqueta received 1,000 ducats (gold coins), and in 1632 was appointed Governor of Cuba and given command of the Spanish forces in Santiago de Cuba. On March 15, 1635, the Dutch forces had an invasion of Cuba in mind. The Dutch naval forces sent crew members on a reconnaissance mission disguised as Spanish soldiers ashore. One of Amezqueta's men became suspicious and a small skirmish ensued. Under Amezqueta's command, 14 men manned their guns and attacked the Dutch crew members who in turn withdraw and fled. Amezqueta renounced his position in 1636 and returned to Puerto Rico.

== Honors ==
The Spanish government honored the defenders of San Juan with a funerary monument on the grounds of El Morro. The monument was dedicated to Amézqueta in 1925, on the 300th anniversary of the defeat of the Dutch. In the 1940s, the United States inaugurated Fort Amezquita, in Isla de Cabras. During World War II, this fort served as a military reservation, or a "concrete gun battery" for the US Army. Juan de Amezqueta's descendant, Jose Andino y Amezquita, would in the future become the first Puerto Rican journalist.

== See also ==
- Battle of San Juan (1625)
- List of Puerto Ricans
- List of Puerto Rican military personnel
- Military history of Puerto Rico
