= José Andino y Amezquita =

First Puerto Rican journalist

- Born: March 24, 1751; San Juan, Puerto Rico
- Died: 1835; Carolina, Puerto Rico
- Occupation: Journalist

José Andino y Amezquita (March 24, 1751 – 1835) was a nationalist and the first Puerto Rican journalist.

== Early years ==
Andino y Amezquita was born in San Juan, Puerto Rico into a prominent and wealthy family. He was a direct descendant of Captain Juan de Amézqueta, a Spanish soldier who defended Puerto Rico from an invasion by the Dutch in 1625. He was also the great-grandson of Field Marshal Gaspar Martinez De Andino, a Spaniard who was appointed by the Spanish Crown Governor of Puerto Rico and served as such from 1683 to 1685.

Andino y Amezquita received his elementary education in Puerto Rico and in 1765, was sent to Granada, Spain, where he continued his academic education at the "Colegio de Nobles Americanos" (College of Noble Americans), a military preparatory school. Andino y Amezquita served in the Spanish Army and eventually reached the rank of captain. He was a person of strong temperament and his disagreements with his fellow officers led to his resignation from the military in 1787.

== Return to Puerto Rico ==
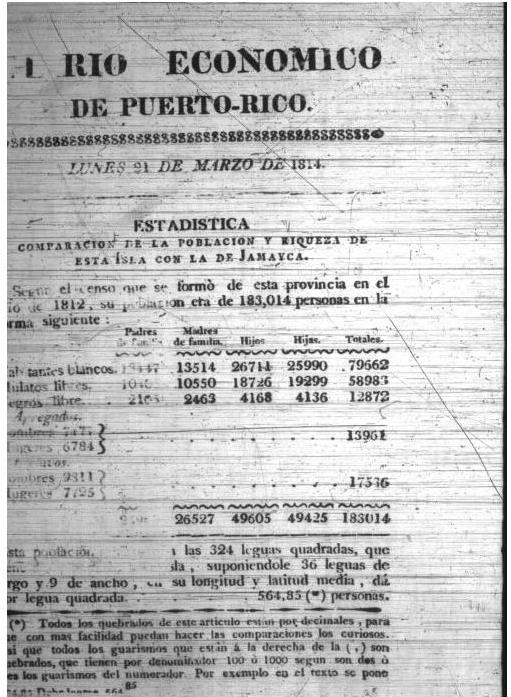
El Diario Económico de Puerto Rico

In 1793, Andino y Amezquita returned to Puerto Rico and was named Royal Minister of Internal Revenue Department. In 1813, he founded the "Sociedad Económica de Amigos del País" (Economic Society of Friends of the Nation), an organization which recognized the artistic talents of the local residents in contests in which those who participated were given monetary prizes.

== First Puerto Rican journalist ==
In 1814, Andino y Amézquita was named director of El Diario Económico de Puerto Rico (The Economic Daily of Puerto Rico), the first privately owned newspaper in the island. He wrote articles on the subjects related to agriculture, commerce, economy and other socioeconomic-related subjects, thus becoming the first Puerto Rican journalist. As a journalist, he proposed the establishment of a National Bank and was able to express and share his nationalistic views. As a journalist for the newspaper El Eco, Andino y Amézquita exhorted his readers to vote during elections for native-born Puerto Ricans instead of candidates born in Spain.

== Later years ==
Upon his retirement, Andino y Amézquita would spend his last years in his farm "La Campaña" in the town of Carolina, Puerto Rico. Andino y Amézquita died in his farm in 1835.

== Legacy ==
The City of Bayamon, Puerto Rico honored his memory by naming a school after him.

== See also ==
- List of Puerto Ricans
