= Battle of San Juan (1625) =

Fought on 29 September 1625 in Puerto Rico

- Part of the Eighty Years' War
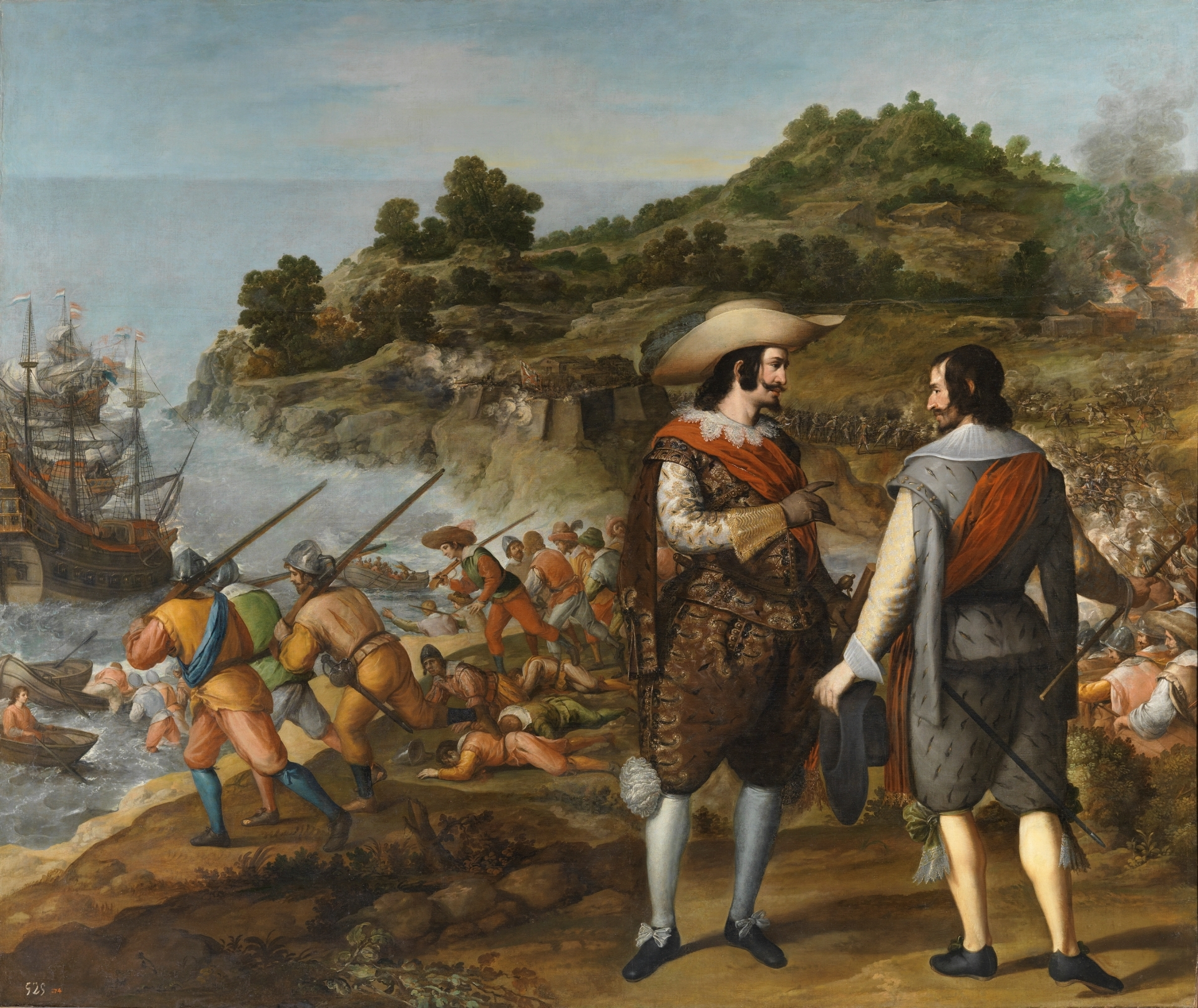
- Seventeenth-century Spanish painting commemorating Hendricksz's defeat at San Juan de Puerto Rico. By Eugenio Caxés, Museo del Prado.
Date	24 September – 2 November 1625
Location	San Juan (present-day Puerto Rico)
Result	Spanish victory

Belligerents
Spain; (Spain) Puerto Rico	Dutch Republic

Commanders and leaders
(Spain) Juan de Haro y Sanvitores	(Dutch Republic) Boudewijn Hendricksz

The Battle of San Juan was fought on 29 September 1625, and was an engagement of the Eighty Years' War. A Dutch expedition under the command of Boudewijn Hendricksz attacked the island of Puerto Rico, but despite besieging San Juan for two months, was unable to capture it from Spain.

== Background ==
The Twelve Years' Truce brought de facto recognition of the Dutch Republic by Spain, while its end saw the Dutch receive assistance from France and England. The Estates General sought an aggressive commercial expansion into the New World, which included the formation of the Dutch West India Company, and the financing of privateers to prey upon Spanish and Portuguese shipping.

== Battle ==
On 24 September 1625, 17 Dutch ships arrived at San Juan de Puerto Rico, whose Spanish governor — naval and military veteran Captain General Juan de Haro y Sanvitores — had been in office less than a month. Nevertheless, he got ready to receive the enemy as best he could preparing El Morro's battery to close the main entrance to San Juan Bay, and sending his predecessor, Juan de Vargas, to nearby Boquerón with militia to hinder any landings in the Escambrón Inlet. Cannon were placed at Boquerón and Goat's Creek, and trenches dug.

Hendricksz implemented a bold plan. At 1:00 P.M. the next day the entire Dutch fleet sailed directly into San Juan’s harbor, led by his flagship. Both sides exchanged fire, but the fleet was soon past El Morro, with the Dutch flagship suffering only 4 dead and a few wounded. However, shoals prevented an immediate disembarkation of troops. The delay allowed Spanish civilians to flee inland over San Antonio Bridge, while the governor marshaled his slender strength of 330 men within Castillo San Felipe del Morro.

On 26 September, Hendricksz led 800 men ashore and occupied the empty city, making La Fortaleza his headquarters. The Dutch occupied El Cañuelo and the San Antonio Bridge, cutting El Morro off from supplies. The Dutch began digging siege trenches, and installing a 6 cannon battery on a height called "Calvary". Hendricksz demanded the surrender of the fort, "in the name of the States General and of His Highness the Prince of Orange, "threatening otherwise that "we will spare neither old nor young, woman nor child." De Haro responded with a counter offer, "if you will deliver the ships in which you came to me, I will let you have one to return with." From that day onwards, a 21-day cannon duel started with El Morro.

Yet, Puerto Rican militiamen were able to recapture San Antonio Bridge, and Capt. Andrés Botello's partisans regained control of the Bayamón River, while burning El Cañuelo. This allowed supplies to reach El Morro once again. By then the Dutch siege trenches had reached El Morro's glacis. On 4 Oct., de Haro started ordering sorties of 80 men in 3 parties, with Juan de Amézqueta personally leading a sortie on 5 Oct.

Hendricksz again called upon de Haro to capitulate on 21 October, "surrender, or we burn the town." De Haro responded with "We have enough courage and wood and stone to build again." On 22 Oct., the Dutch started burning all buildings, over 100 houses, including Bishop Balbueno's palace and library, and the city archives. Capt. Amézqueta led a sortie from El Morro, while Capt. Botello led one from San Antonio Bridge, which drove the Dutch from their trenches, as they retreated to their ships.

== Aftermath ==
The Dutch finally left on 2 November, leaving behind one of their ships and over 400 dead. Nevertheless, Spain concluded that it needed to further strengthen Puerto Rico's defenses to prevent future invasions.

== See also ==
- Military history of Puerto Rico
- Annus mirabilis
