= La Fortaleza =

Residence and office of the governor of Puerto Rico

- Palacio de Santa Catalina
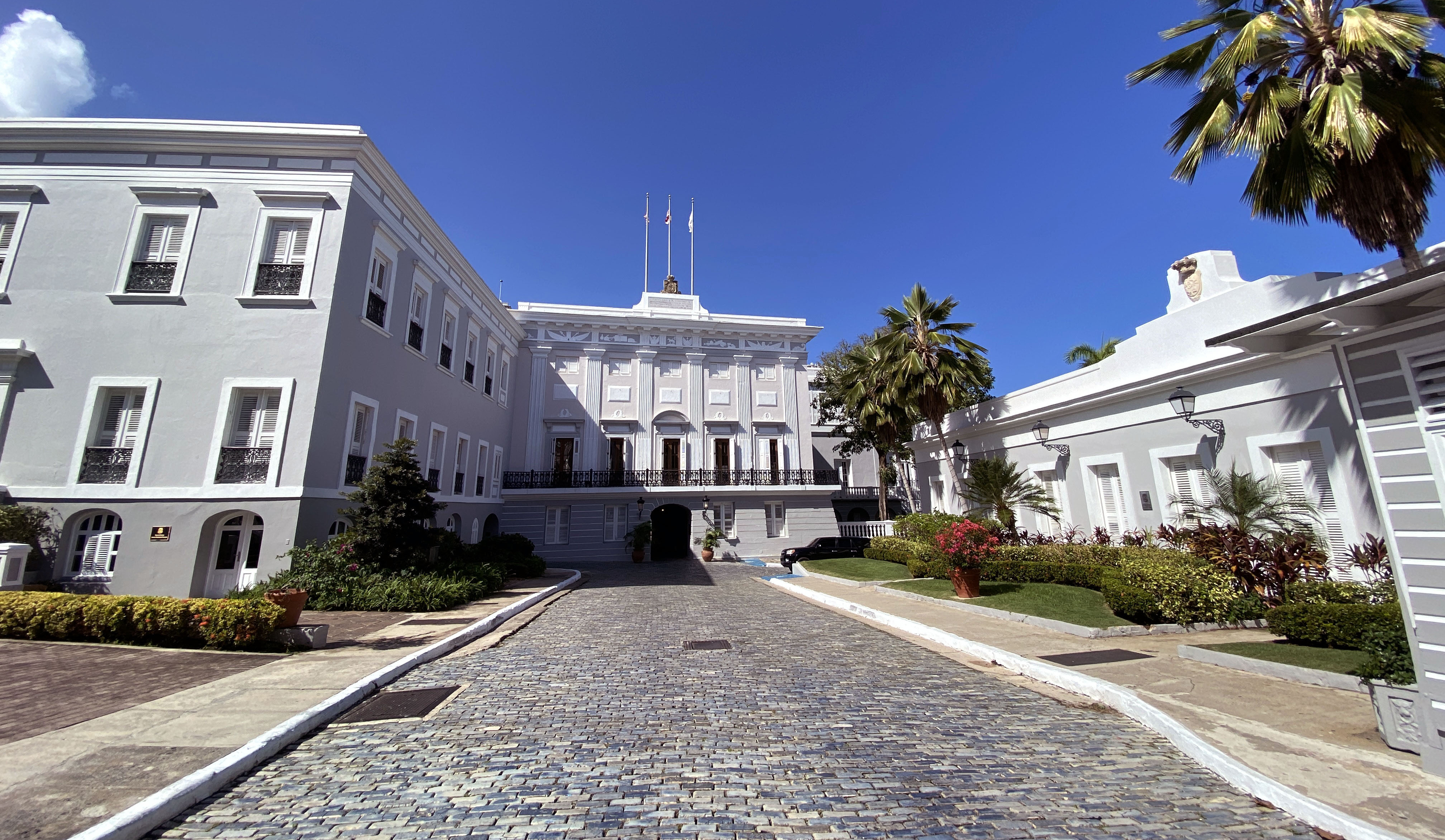
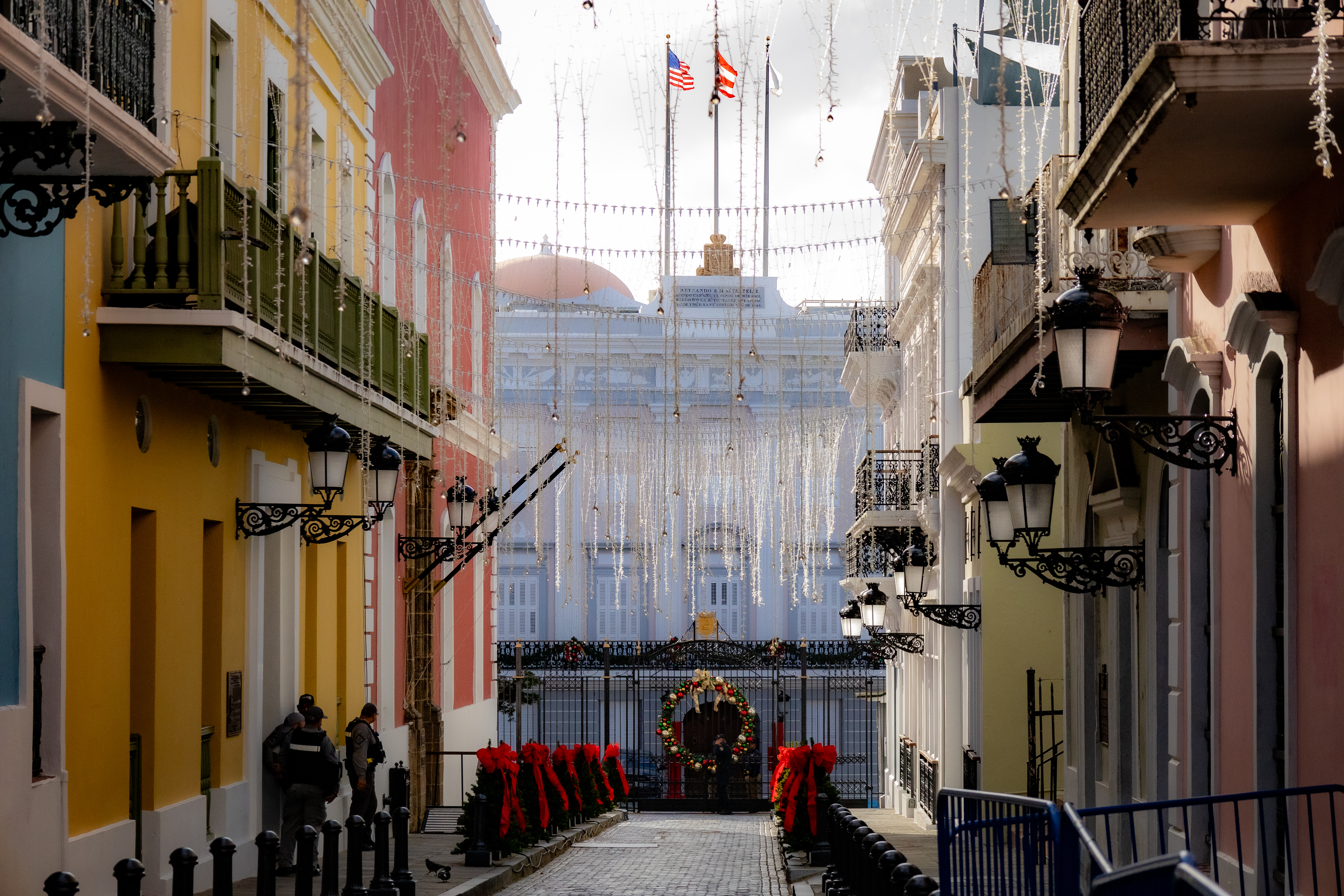
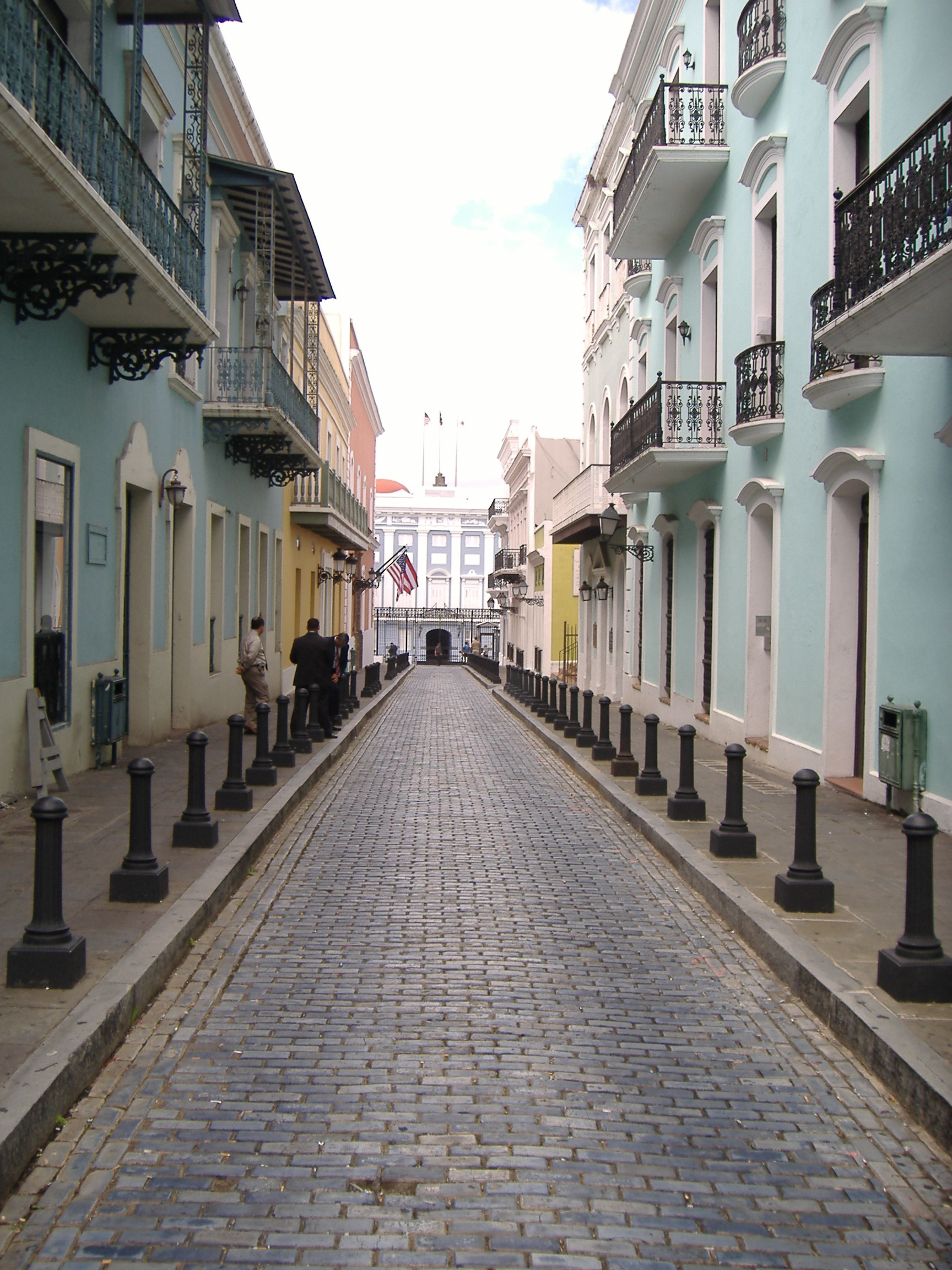
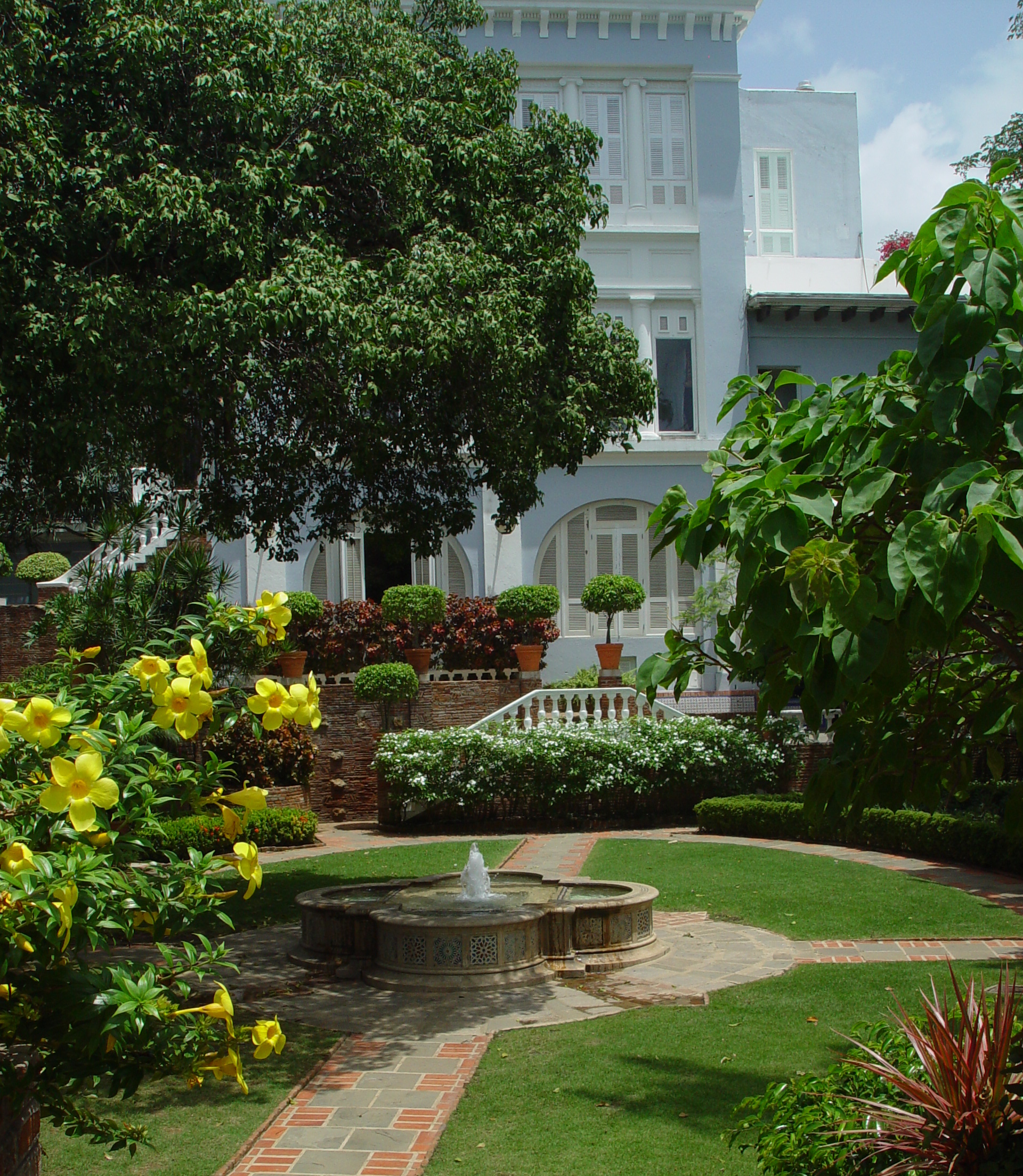
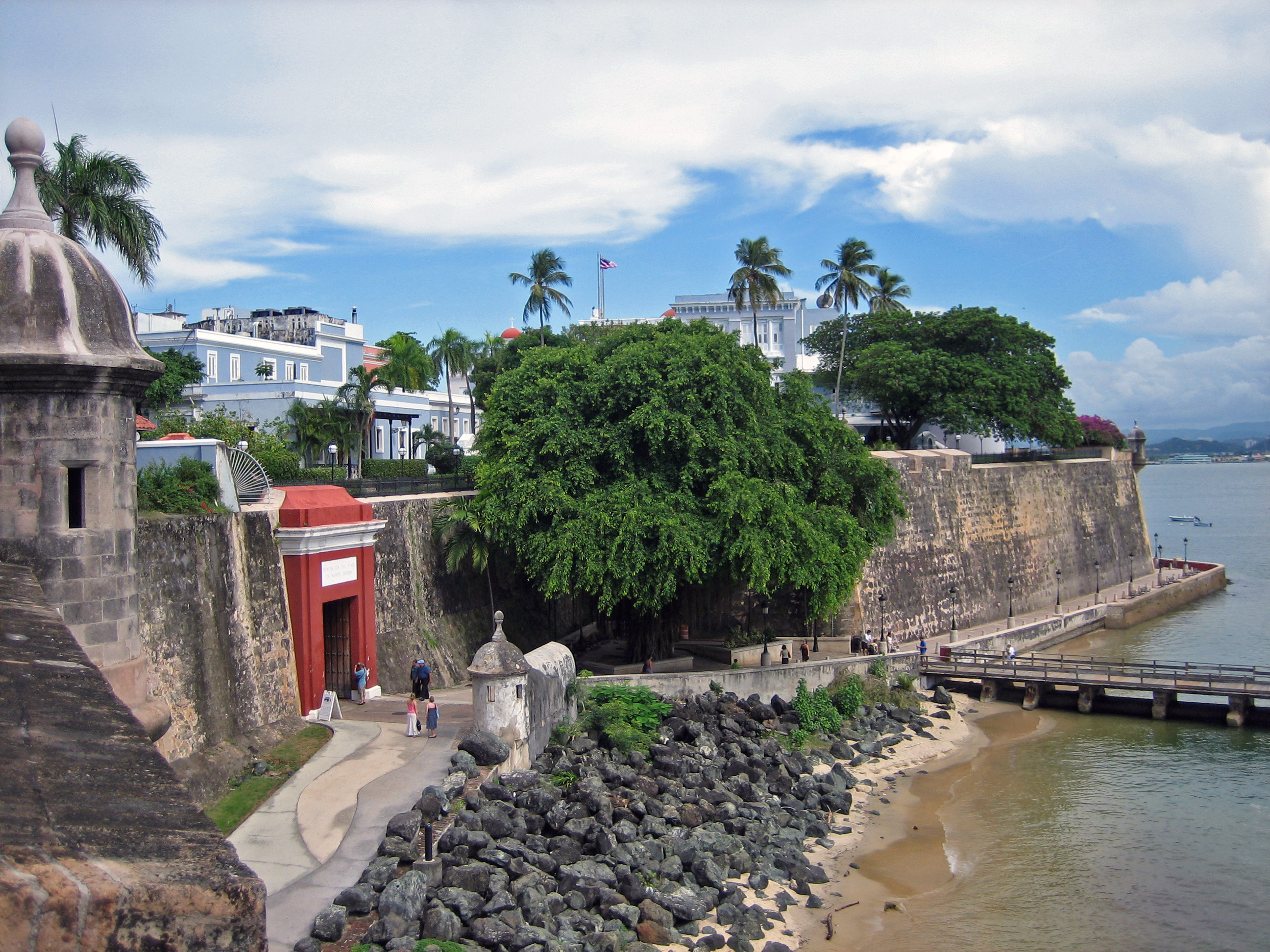
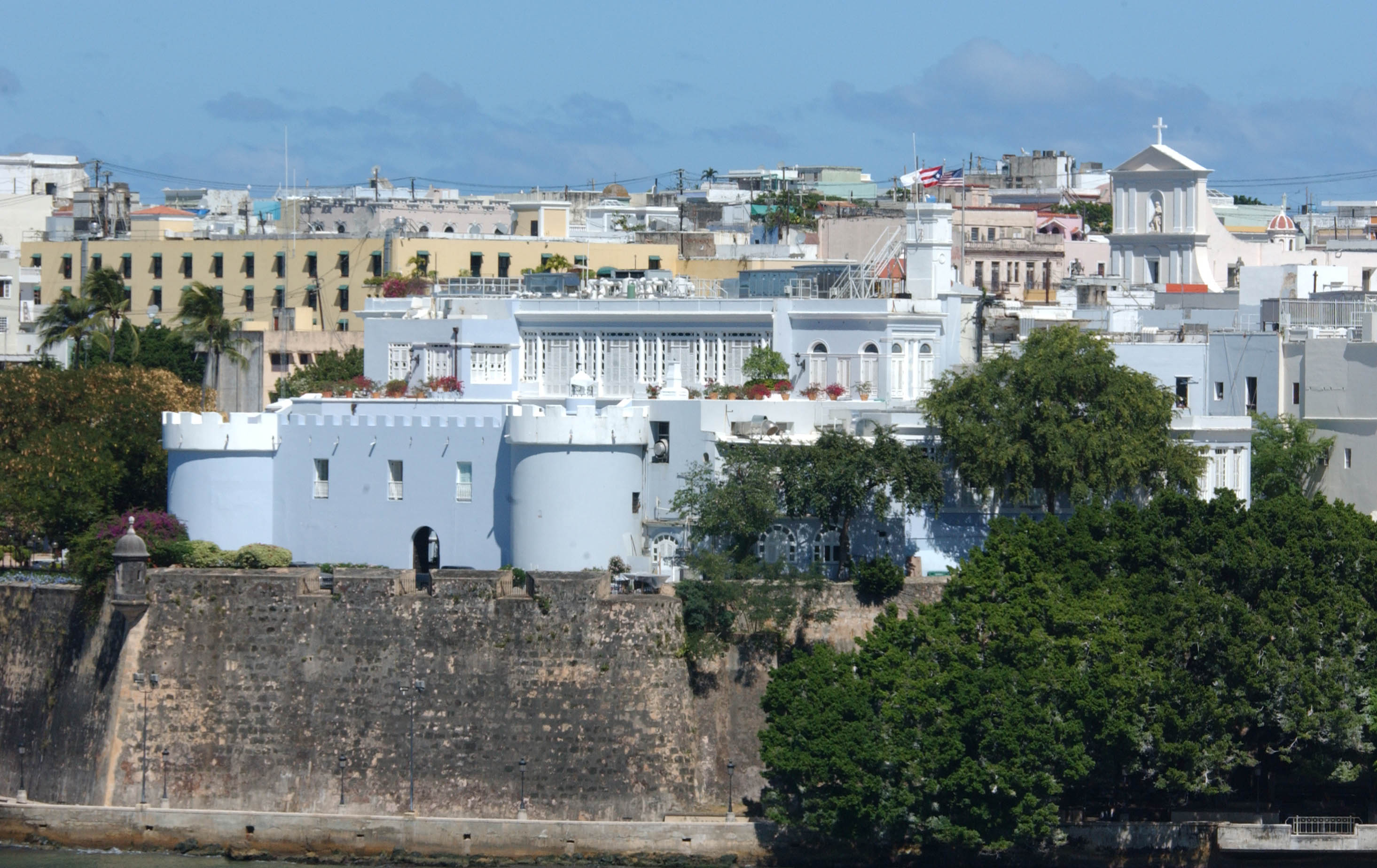
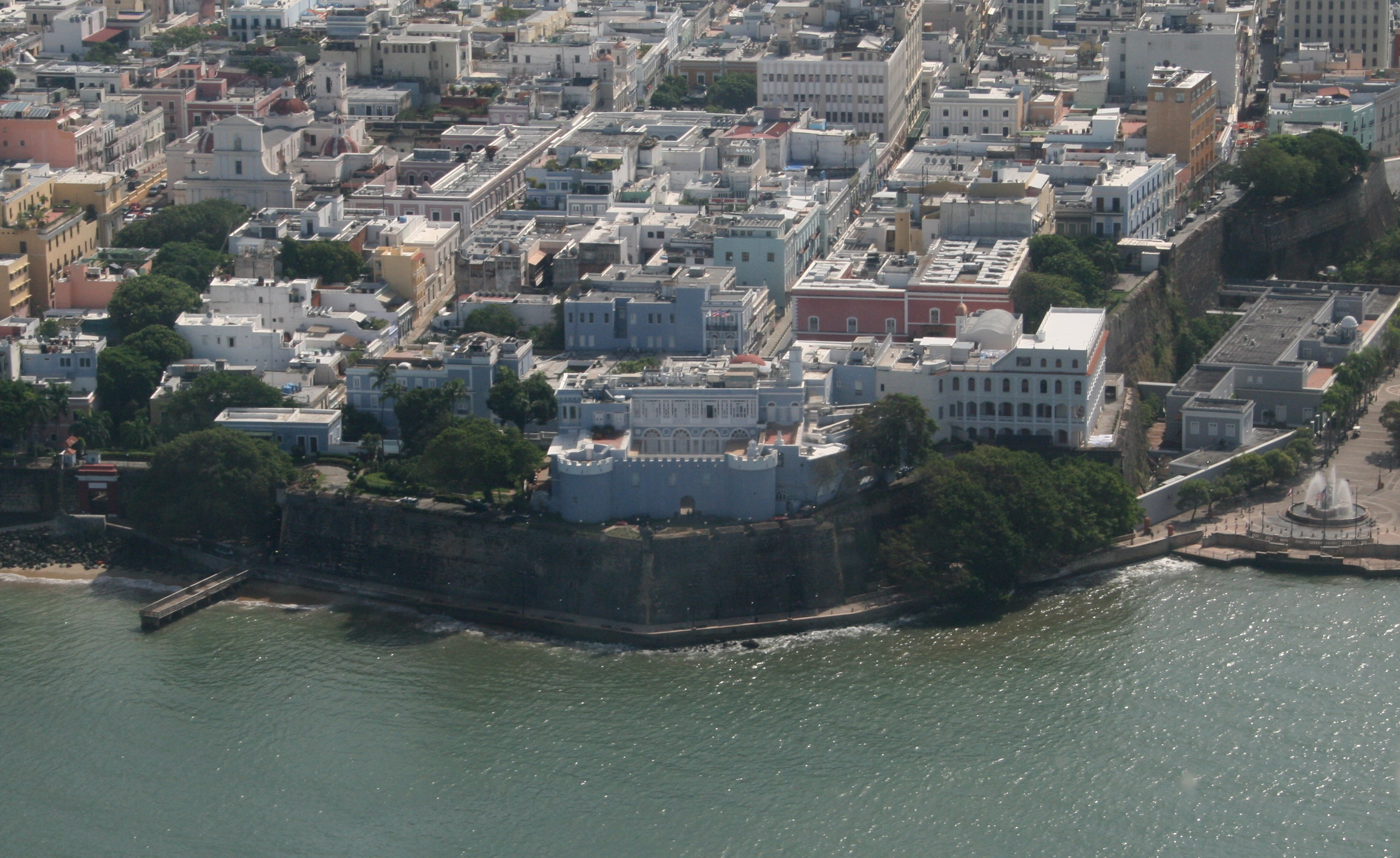
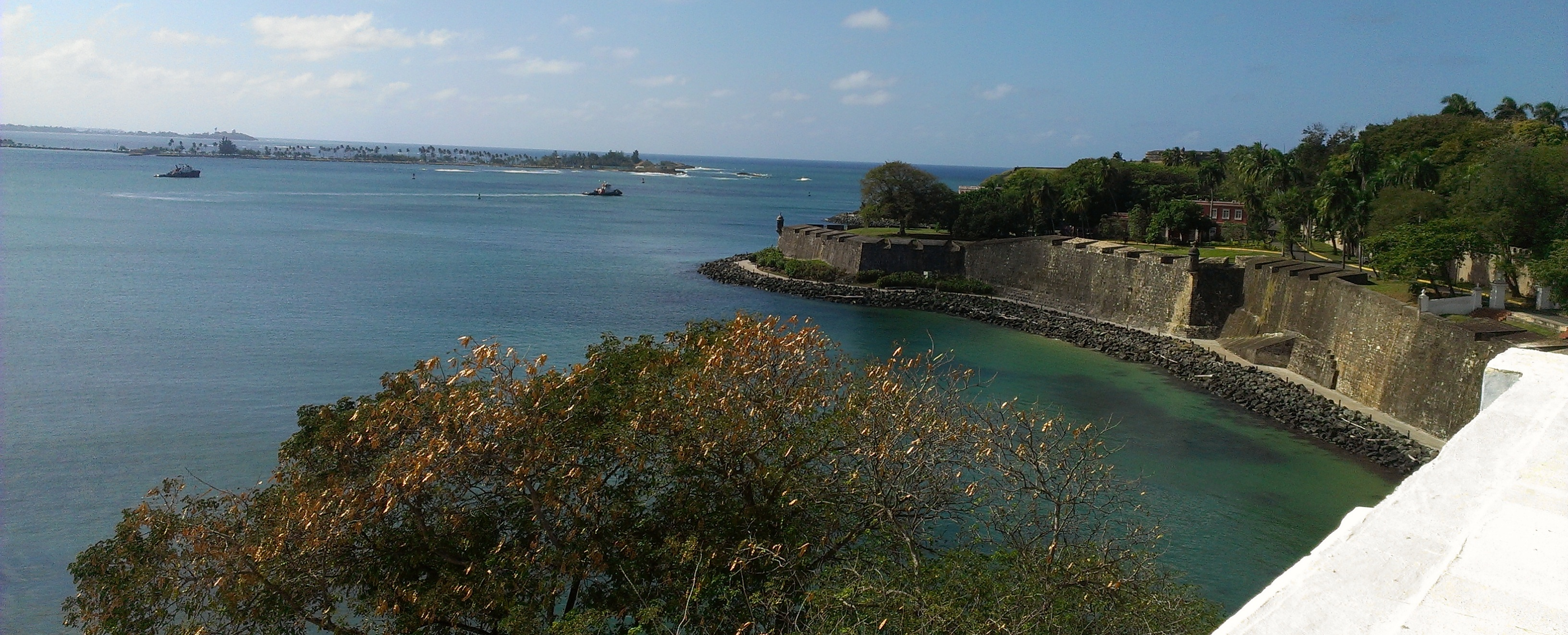
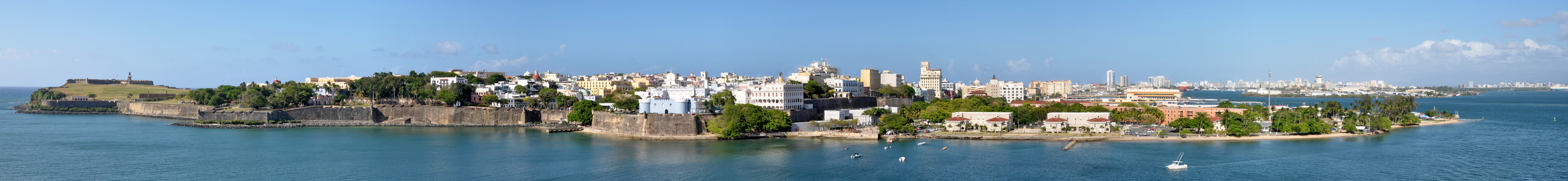
- From top, left to right: Wide view of front façade (east) of La Fortaleza; close-up view of Calle de la Fortaleza (Fortaleza Street); close-up view of Jardín Hundio ("sunken garden") next to side façade (north); wide view of side façade (north) above Puerta de San Juan (San Juan Gate); wide view of rear façade (west) from San Juan Bay; aerial view of La Fortaleza within the Walls of Old San Juan and above Paseo de la Princesa; wide view of entrance to San Juan Bay from La Fortaleza; and view of and panoramic view of western end of San Juan Islet from San Juan Bay with La Fortaleza (center)
- Interactive map

General information
- Architectural style: Colonial, Renaissance, Neoclassical
- Location: 63 Calle de la Fortaleza, San Juan, Puerto Rico 00901
- Coordinates: 18°27′51″N 66°7′9″W
- Year built: 1533–1540
- Owner: Government of Puerto Rico

Design and construction
- Known for: Battle of San Juan in 1595, 1598, 1625, 1797, and 1898

Website
- www.fortaleza.pr.gov

UNESCO World Heritage Site
- Type: Cultural
- Criteria: vi
- Designated: 1983 (7th session)
- Part of: La Fortaleza and San Juan National Historic Site in Puerto Rico
- Reference no.: 266
- Region: The Americas

U.S. National Historic Landmark
- Official name: La Fortaleza
- Designated: October 9, 1960

U.S. National Register of Historic Places
- Official name: La Fortaleza
- Designated: October 15, 1966
- Reference no.: 66000951

La Fortaleza (English: "the fortress"), also known as Palacio de Santa Catalina ("Saint Catherine's Palace"), is the official residence and workplace of the Governor of Puerto Rico. Located in the historic quarter of Old San Juan in the capital city and municipality of San Juan, it has housed the governor since the 16th century, making it the oldest executive seat in continuous use in the New World. Built as a medieval fortress from 1533 to 1540 by orders of King Charles I of Spain and remodeled to its present Neoclassical style in 1846 by orders of Governor Rafael Arístegui, it was the first fortification erected by the Spanish on San Juan Islet to defend San Juan Bay, the harbor of Old San Juan. Alongside El Morro, San Cristóbal, and other forts part of the Walls of Old San Juan, it protected strategically and militarily important Puerto Rico, or La Llave de las Indias (The Key to the Indies), from invasions by competing world powers and raids from privateers and pirates during the Age of Discovery and Sail. It was designated a World Heritage Site in 1983.

Situated in the western end of San Juan Islet in the Old San Juan historic quarter, La Fortaleza, seat of the executive branch, is about 1 mile (1.6 km) from the Capitol of Puerto Rico, seat of the legislative branch, in the center of the Islet in the Puerta de Tierra historic district, and 2 miles (3.2 km) from the Supreme Court Building, seat of the judicial branch, in the eastern end of the Islet in Puerta de Tierra. The Court and Capitol are directly connected via Luis Muñoz Rivera Avenue in the north and Juan Ponce de León Avenue in the south, both of which are directly linked to La Fortaleza via San Francisco Street in the north and Fortaleza Street in the south.

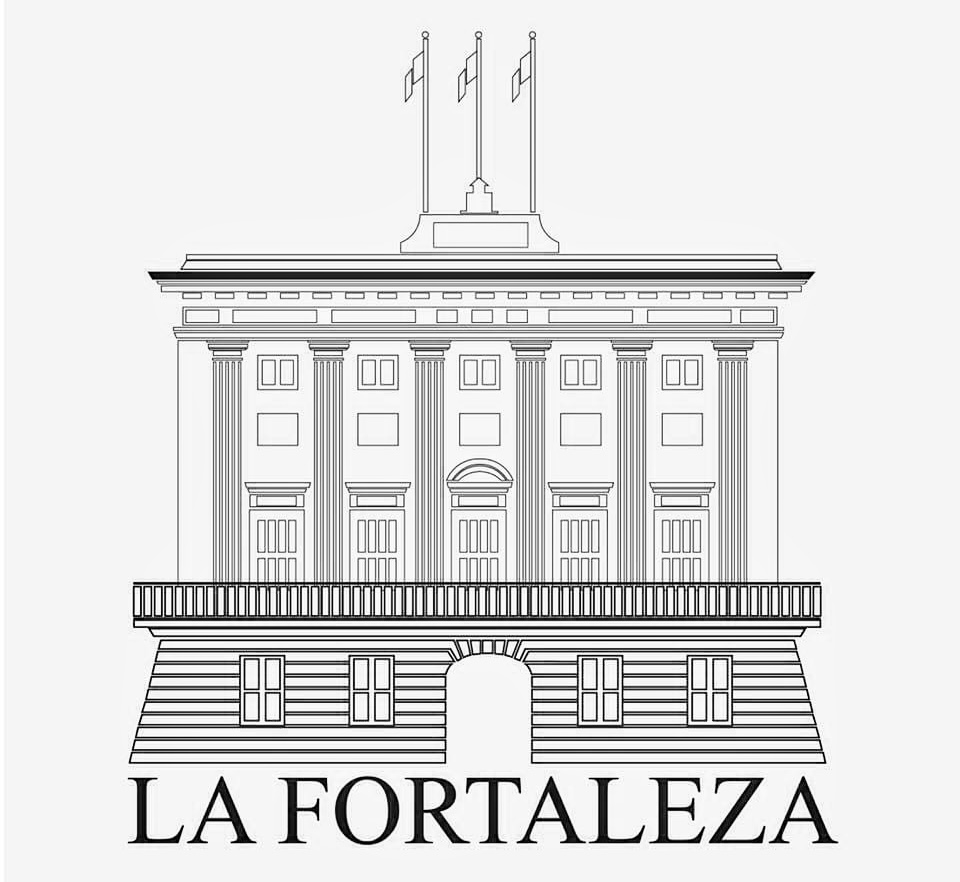
Logo of La Fortaleza, 2024

== Structure ==
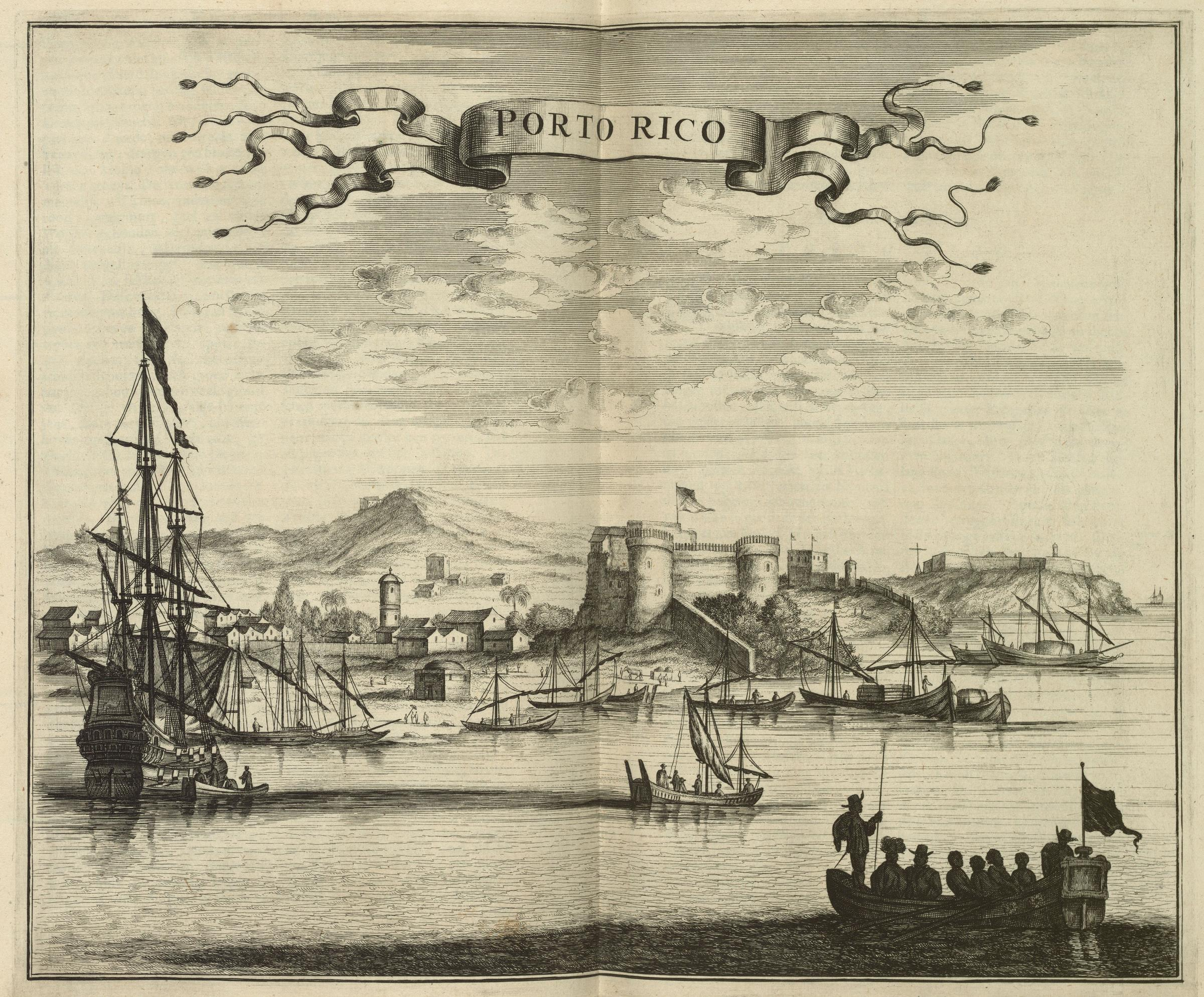
Rear façade (west) of La Fortaleza from San Juan Bay as depicted in the 1671 edition of John Ogilby's America, one of the most influential works of the 17th century

La Fortaleza was the first defensive fortification built in the historic city of Old San Juan, originally known as Ciudad de Puerto Rico (rich port city), and the first of a series of military structures built to protect the city, which included the San Felipe del Morro Fortress and the San Cristóbal Fortress. The construction was authorized by Charles V, Holy Roman Emperor as a defense against attacks from Island Caribs and the European powers of the time.

Initially, the structure consisted of four walls enclosing an interior patio with a circular tower known as the Homage Tower. From the top of the tower, following military tradition, the governor would take fidelity oaths at critical moments to the King and Queen of Spain. Later, a second tower named the Austral Tower was constructed.

During the 1640 reconstruction, a chapel named after Santa Catalina Alejandría originally standing outside the fortification's walls was integrated into the structure's walls, resulting in the alternate name of Palacio de Santa Catalina (Saint Catherine's Palace).

The complex currently consists of a few attached buildings with formal living quarters on the second floor and private quarters on the third. It overlooks the high city walls that front the bay, and within the north perimeter of the house are sheltered gardens and a swimming pool. The exterior of the palace has featured white, light blue, and light gray paint.

== History ==
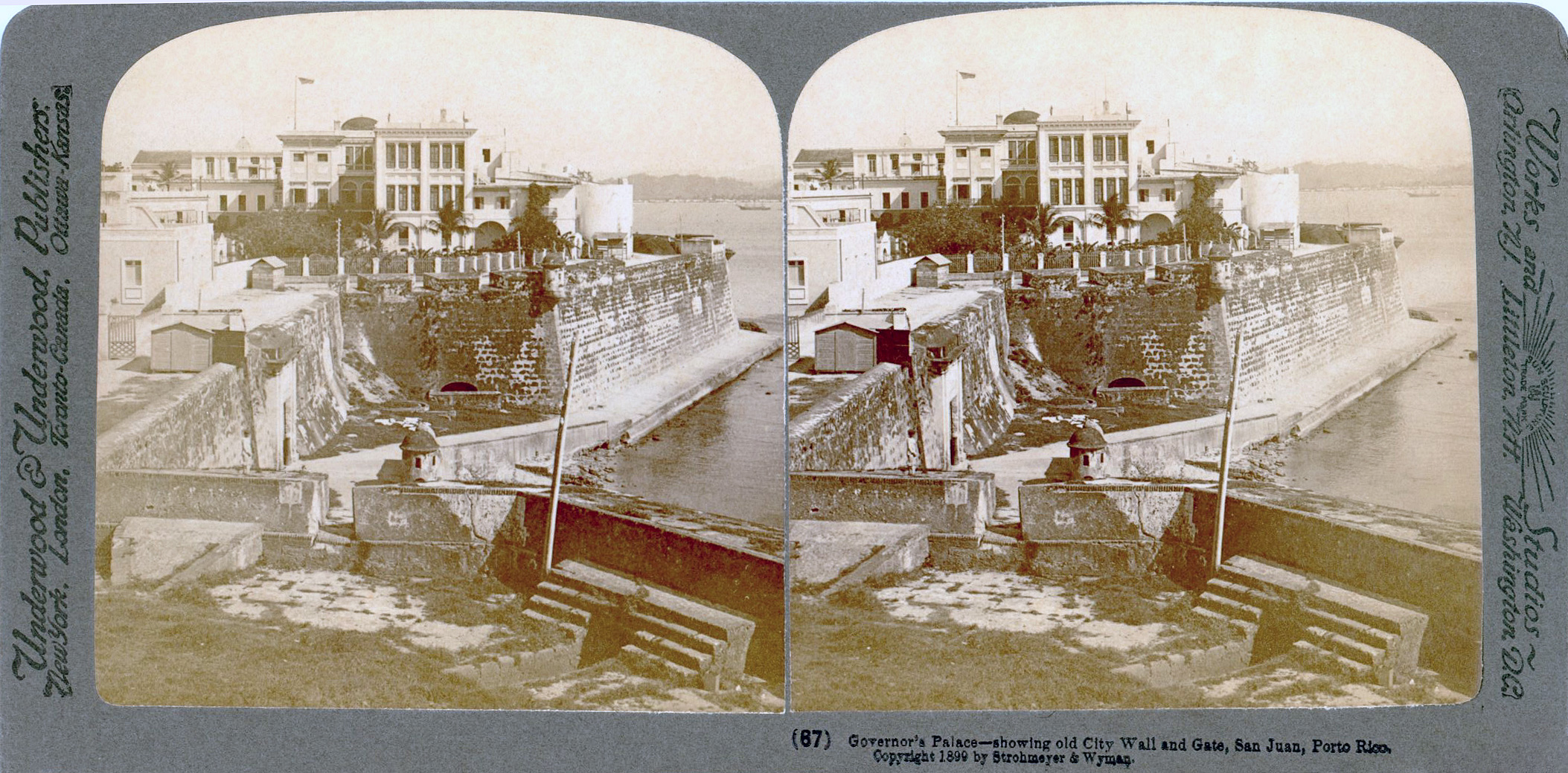
Side façade (north) of La Fortaleza in 1899

Starting in 1529, Governor La Gama petitioned the emperor on the need to build defensive fortifications "because the island's defenseless condition caused the people to emigrate." Construction started in 1533, using stone, and concluded by 1540. Yet the fort had no guns, and Gonzalo Fernández de Oviedo y Valdés commented, "if it had been constructed by blind men could not have been located in a worse location." Yet the structure has served as the governor's residence since 1544.

Since the 16th century, La Fortaleza has acted as the residence of the Governor of Puerto Rico, making it the oldest executive mansion in continuous use in the Americas. The mansion was remodeled in 1846 by the Spanish authorities to adapt its military origin to its new purely administrative function.

La Fortaleza has been captured three times by foreign powers:

- 1598, George Clifford, Earl of Cumberland, attacked San Juan.
- In 1625, General Boudewijn Hendricksz (Balduino Enrico) of the Netherlands invaded the city and established himself at La Fortaleza. During the Dutch retreat, the fortress and the city were set ablaze.
- 1898, the U.S. Navy invaded and occupied Puerto Rico, establishing a provisional government.

In 1834, Colonel George Dawson Flinter described the fortress of Santa Catalina as having a chapel, stables, cistern, and an east wing with spacious apartments.

According to tradition, in 1898, just before the United States invaded Puerto Rico during the Spanish–American War, the last Spanish governor of the island, Ricardo De Ortega, struck a longcase clock in La Fortaleza with his sword, stopping the clock and marking the time at which Spain lost control over Puerto Rico.

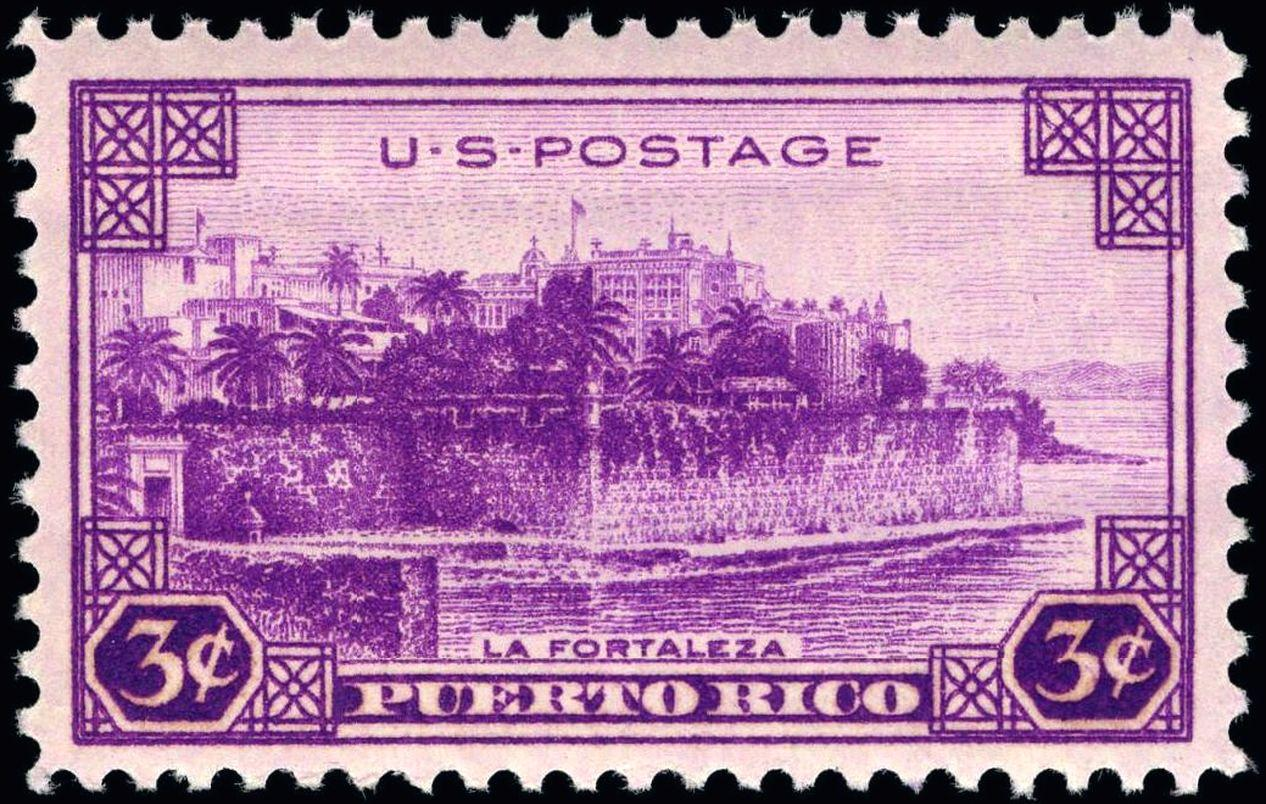
Side façade (north) of La Fortaleza on a U.S. stamp in 1937

On July 17, 1939, John W. Wright and Ernest H. Gruening discussed the restoration of La Fortaleza, using the modifications by Spanish architects at Casa Blanca as a reference. On October 30, 1950, there was an attempt by members of the Puerto Rican Nationalist Party to enter La Fortaleza in what is known as the San Juan Nationalist revolt, intending to attack then-governor Luis Muñoz Marín. The 5-minute shootout resulted in four Nationalists dead: Domingo Hiraldo Resto, Carlos Hiraldo Resto, Manuel Torres Medina, and Raímundo Díaz Pacheco. Three of the guards of the building, among them Lorenzo Ramos, were seriously injured.

On October 9, 1960, La Fortaleza was designated a United States National Historic Landmark. Teodoro Vidal, a cultural affairs official under Luis Muñoz Marín, organized renovation work on the building around this time. The Institute of Puerto Rican Culture (ICP) participated in the ceremony, with its director Ricardo Alegría mentioning his belief that the plaque should read that it was a "national monument of Puerto Rico". The intervention, however, was controversial with Eladio Rodríguez Otero of the Ateneo Puertorriqueño criticizing him for "supporting that monument as a historic site of the United States" in an article published by El Mundo. Alegría harshly dismissed it, further claiming that the registry would not mean federal intervention and was only a symbolic recognition of historical value. Furthermore, he clarified that the preservation of La Fortaleza would remain in the hands of the ICP.

When the restoration of La Fortaleza began in 1962, the demolition of an overlook built under Rexford G. Tugwell was authorized by Muñoz Marín. The legislature initially assigned $5,000 per year, which would be renewed on an annual basis. During the Luis A. Ferré administration, the ICP collaborated in the restoration of the interior decor of La Fortaleza, providing paintings and draftsmen. On September 2, 1969, Ferré wrote to Alegría thanking him for the restoration of the building. In 1983, La Fortaleza, along with the San Juan National Historic Site, was declared a World Heritage Site by UNESCO.

== In literature ==
In 2011, Puerto Rican author Giannina Braschi wrote the dramatic novel United States of Banana, featuring climactic scenes of revolution at La Fortaleza.

== Gallery ==
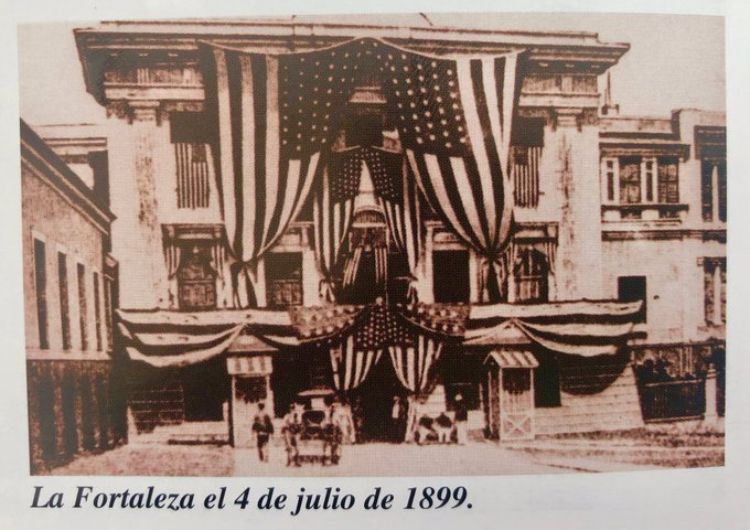
Front façade (east) of La Fortaleza on July 4, 1899

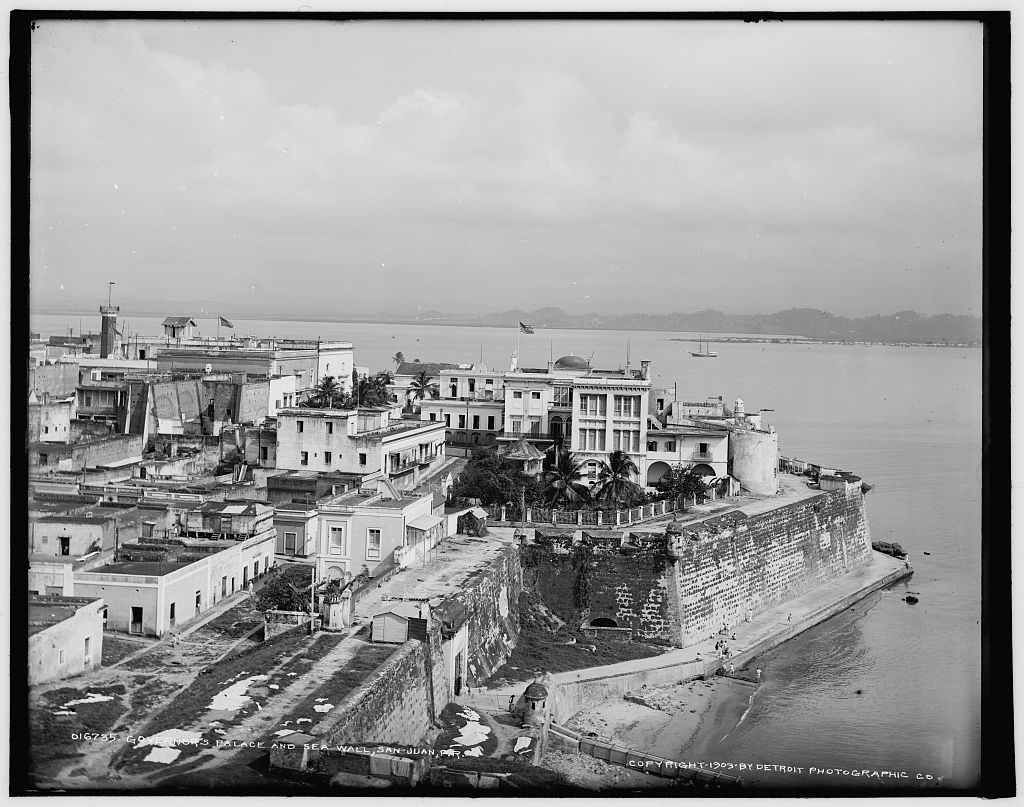
Side façade (north) of La Fortaleza within Old San Juan in 1903

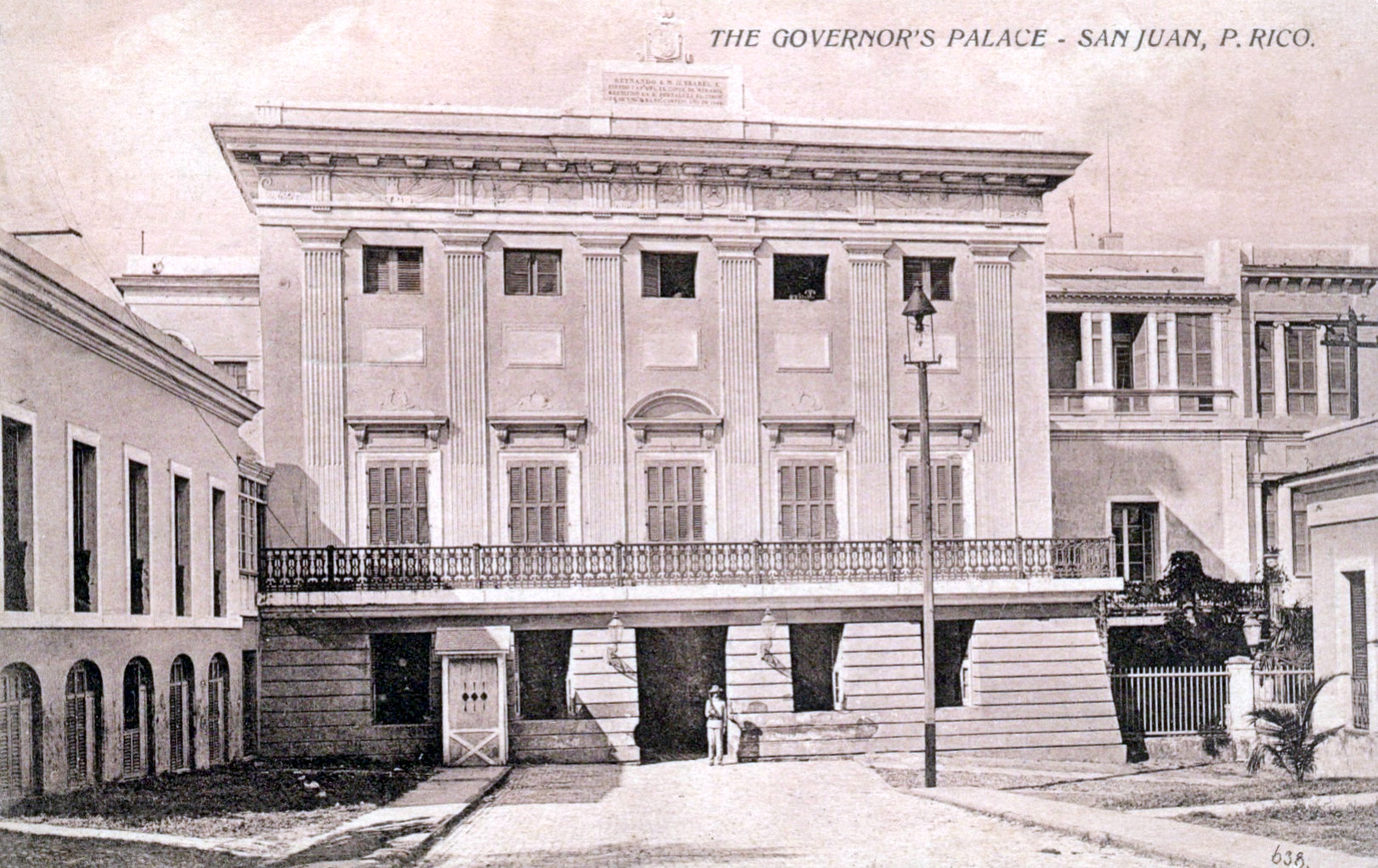
Front façade (east) of La Fortaleza in 1908

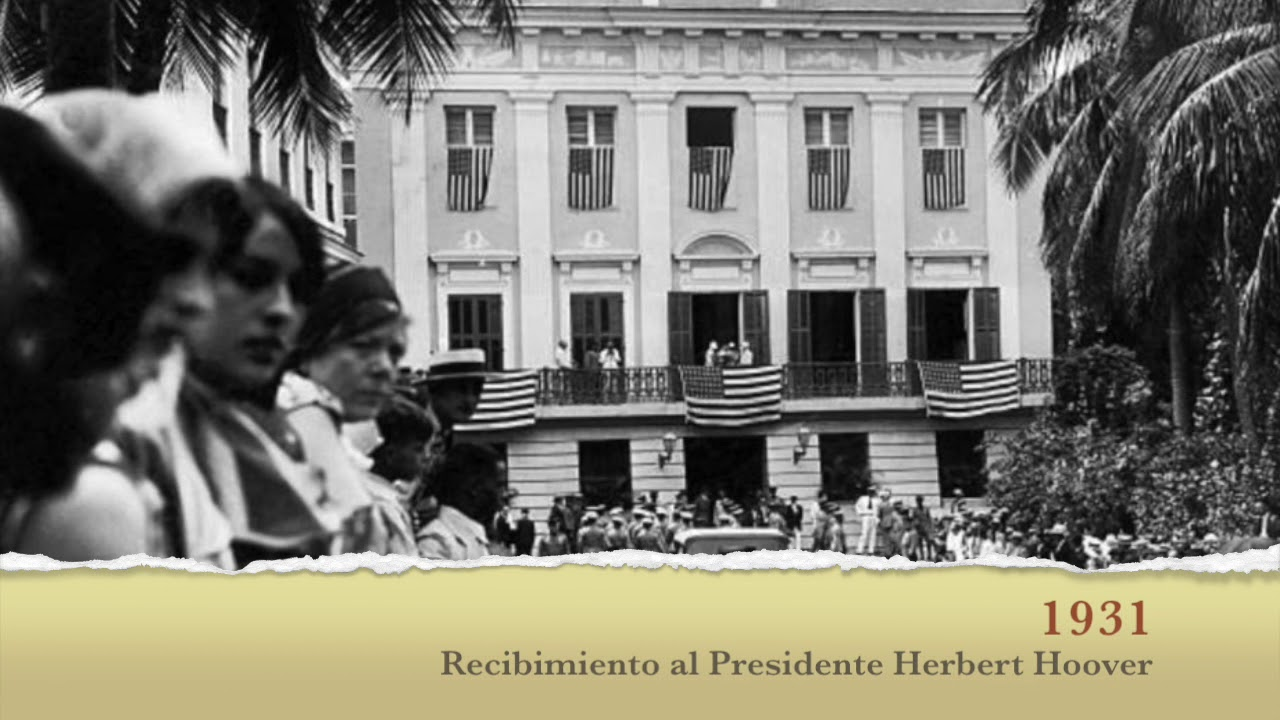
Reception of the U.S. President Herbert Hoover to La Fortaleza in 1931

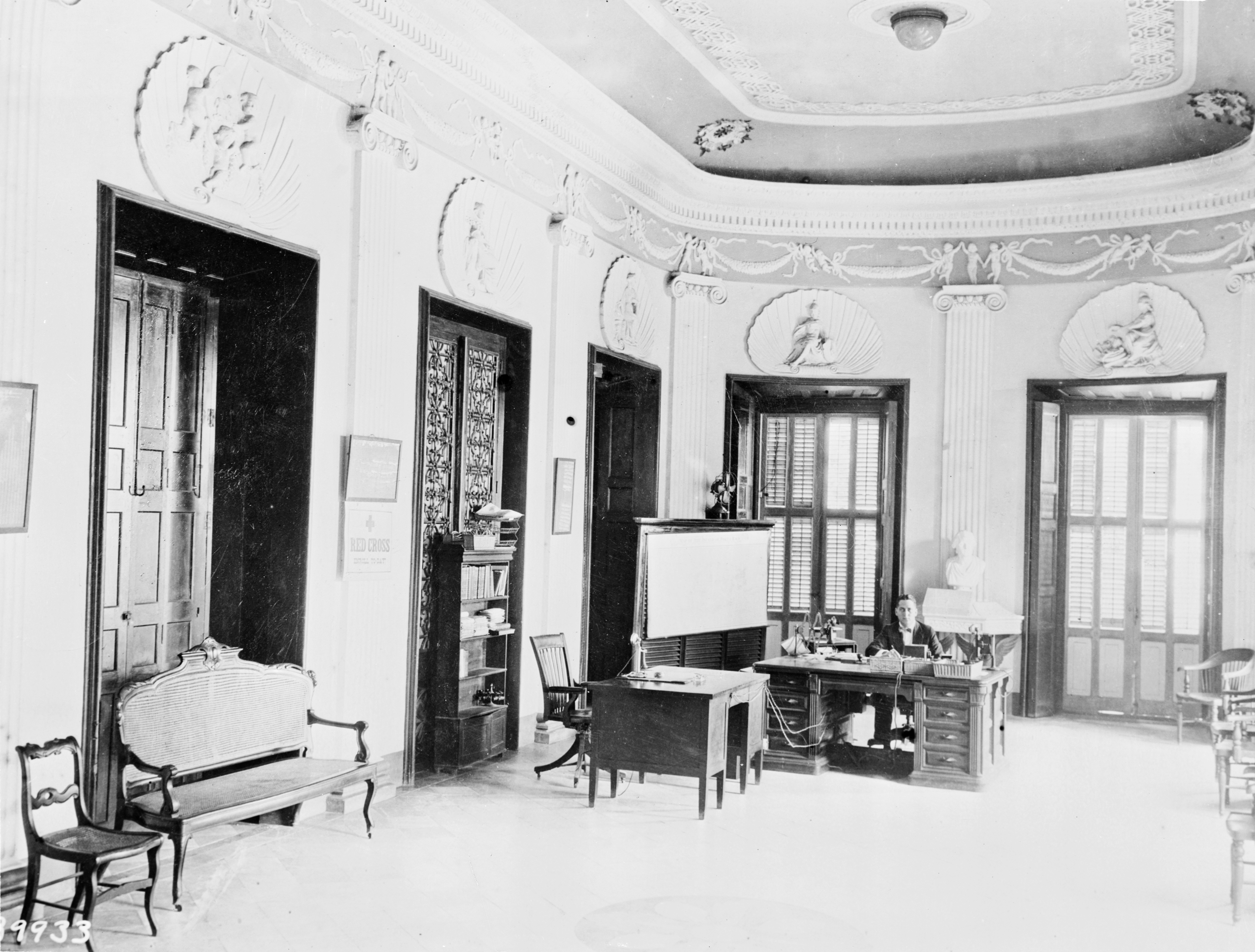
Original "Throne Room", currently Governor's Office, La Fortaleza in 1933. Photo by Jack E. Boucher. Historic American Buildings Survey.

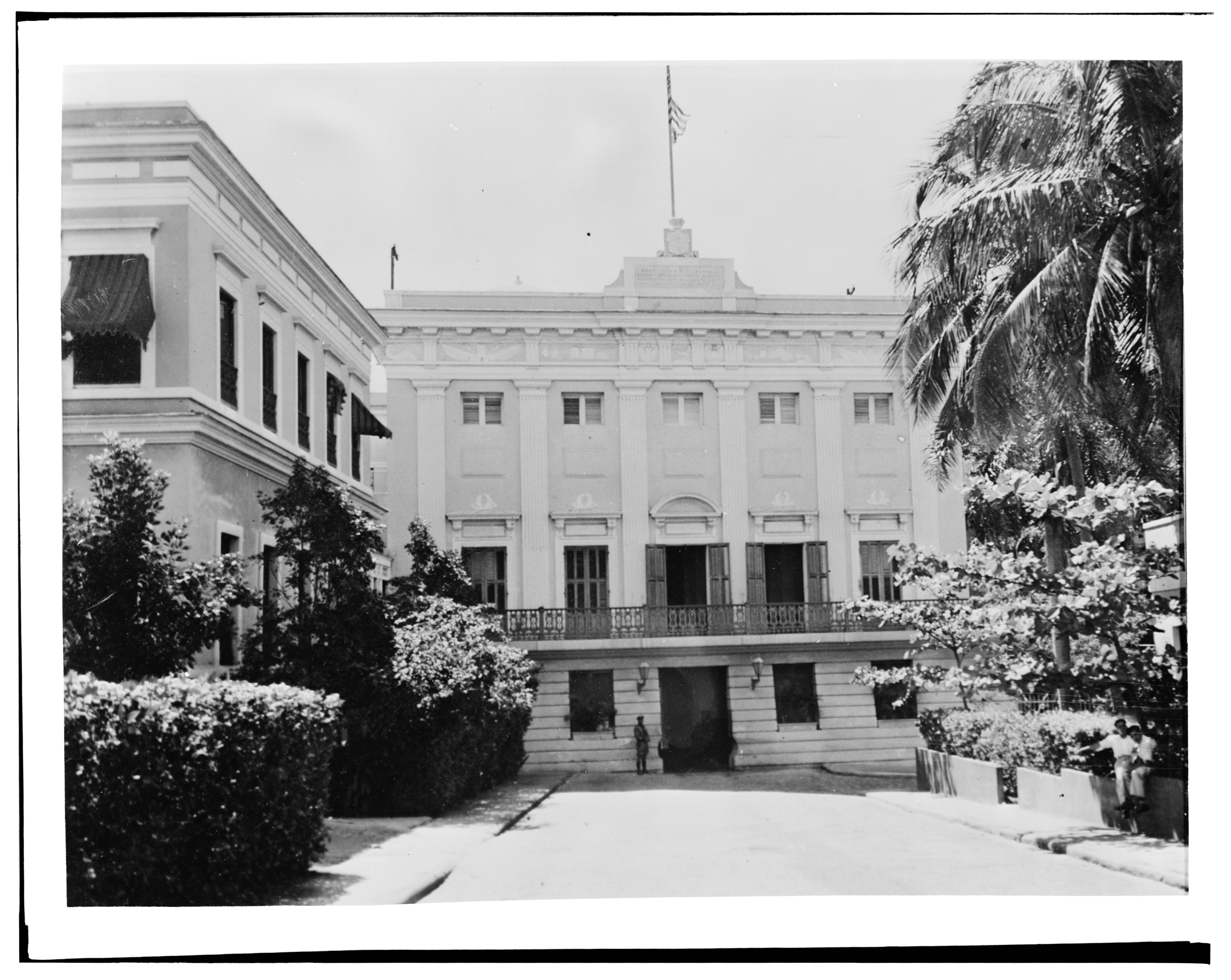
La Fortaleza in 1933. Photo by Jack E. Boucher. Historic American Buildings Survey.

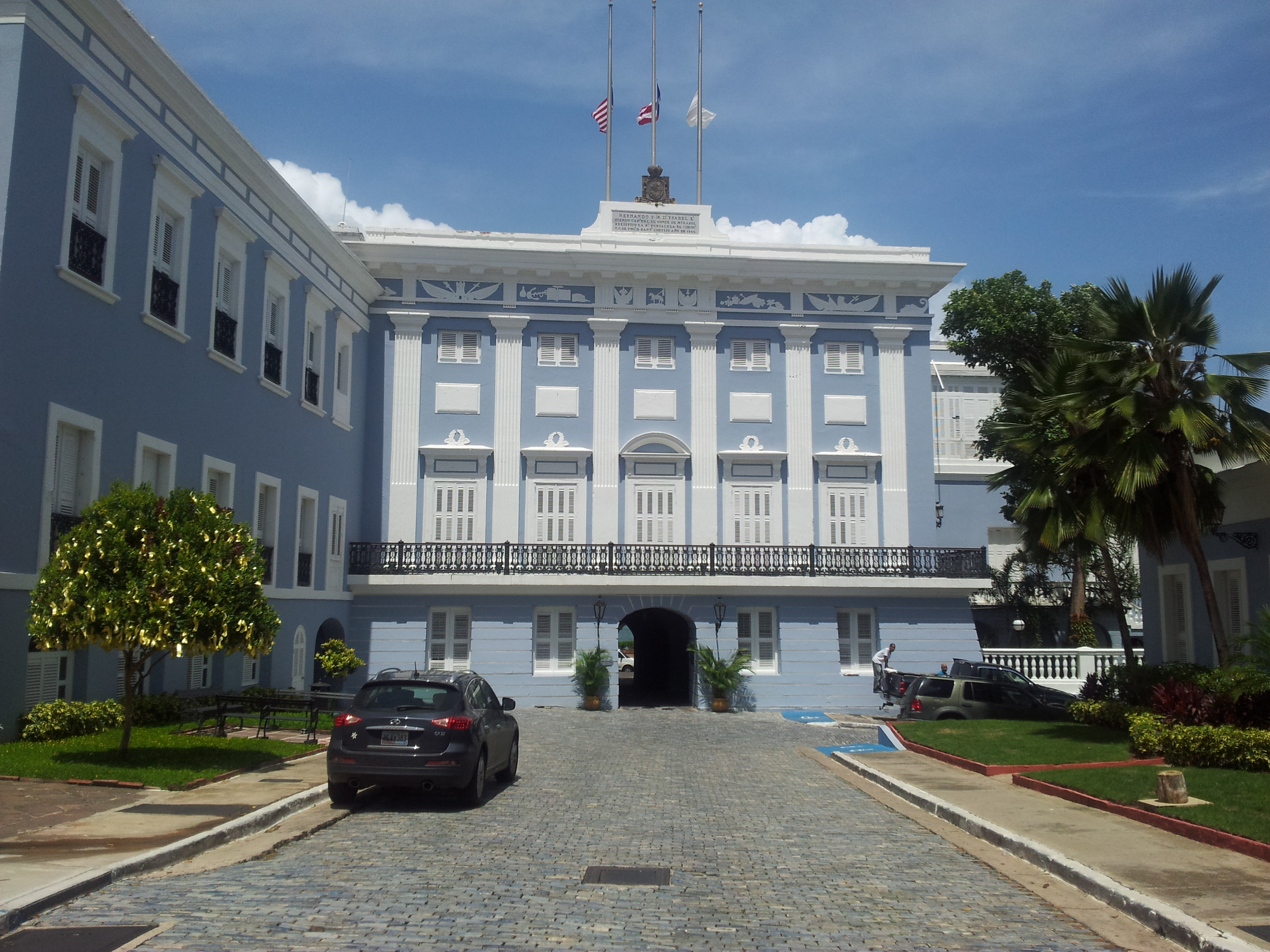
Front view of La Fortaleza

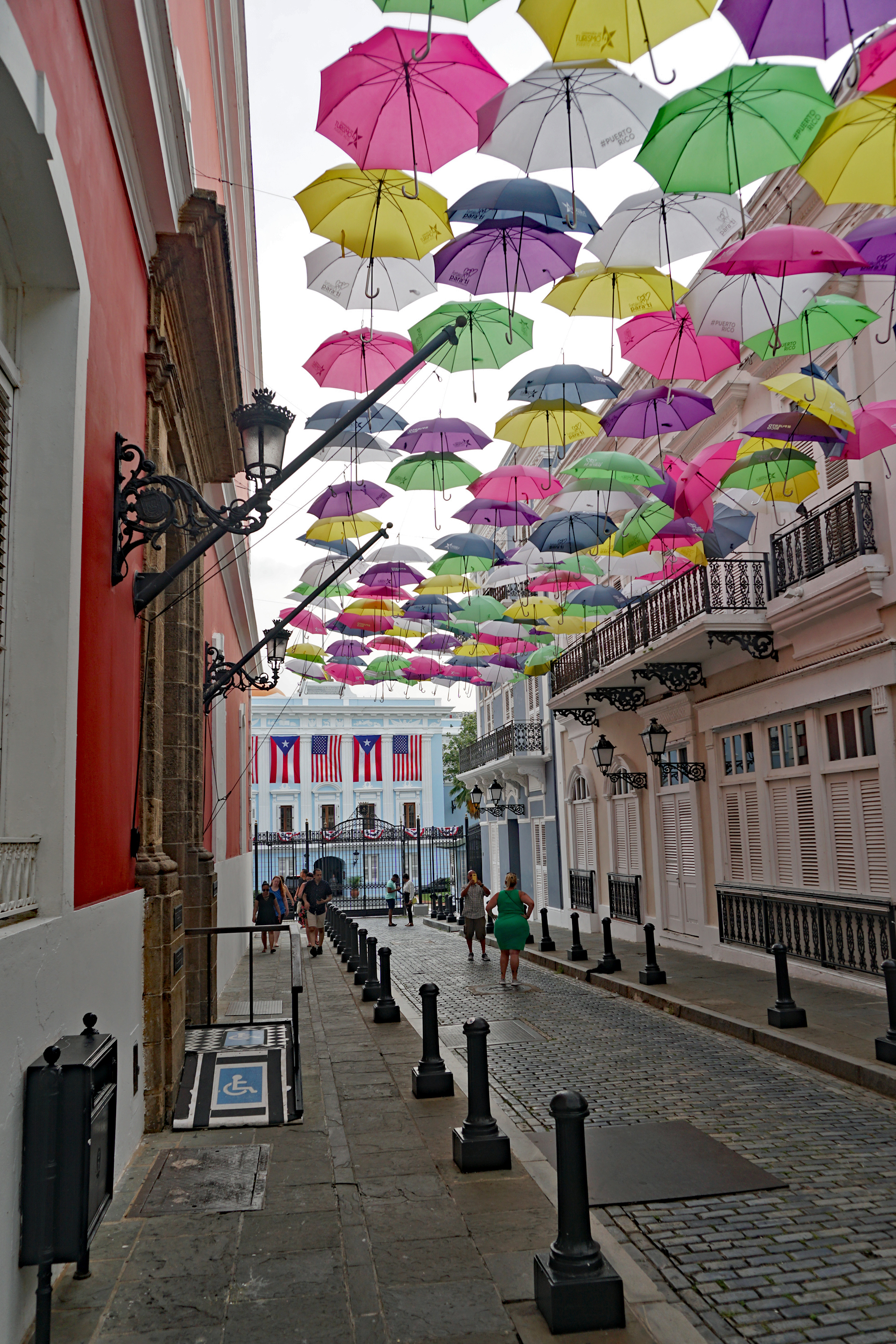
Calle de la Fortaleza leading to the palace with a canopy of multicolored umbrellas

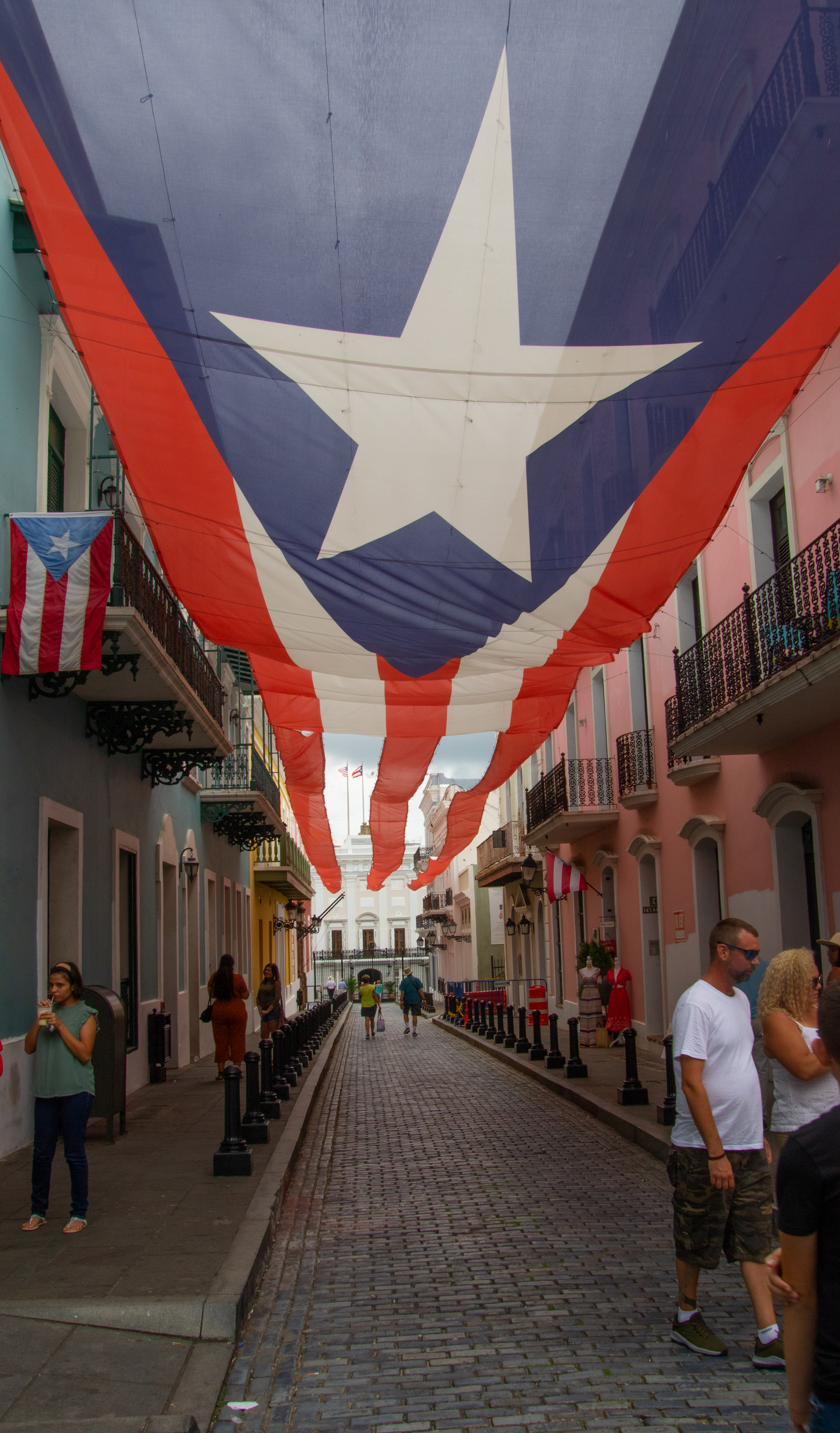
Calle de la Fortaleza leading to the palace with a canopy of the Monoestrellada (Monostarred) flag of Puerto Rico

== See also ==
- List of United States National Historic Landmarks in United States commonwealths and territories, associated states, and foreign states
- List of the oldest buildings in Puerto Rico
- National Register of Historic Places listings in metropolitan San Juan, Puerto Rico
