= Boudewijn Hendricksz =

Dutch corsair and admiral

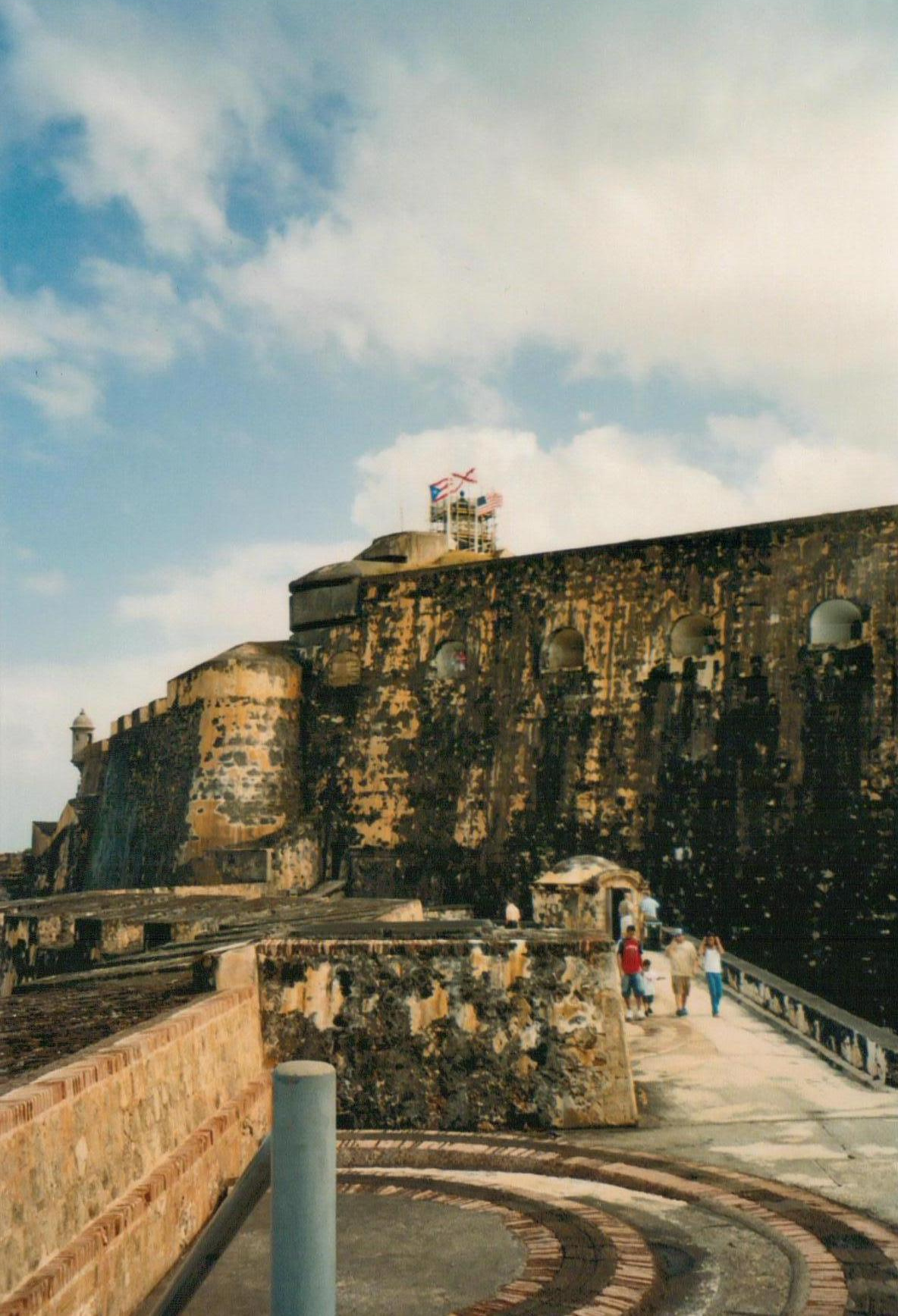
Castillo San Felipe del Morro. Despite concerted effort, Boudewijn Hendricksz was unable to overcome the fortress.

Boudewijn Hendricksz (died 1626) (also known as Hendrikszoon, Bowdoin Henrick to the English, and Balduino Enrico to the Spanish) was a Dutch corsair and later Admiral. He is most famous for his role in the Battle of San Juan (1625) during the Eighty Years' War, in which he tried but failed to capture San Juan from Spanish forces. In the same year, prior the assault on San Juan he attempted to recapture Bahia, Brazil after the Spanish overcame Dutch forces in the city.

He was at one point also one of the burgemeesters of Edam.

== Military campaigns ==
In 1625 the Dutch West India Company ordered Hendrijks to rescue Bahia, which was held by the Dutch hands but had been attacked by the Spaniards. He was given 34 ships with good artillery and 6,500 men, but by the time he arrived in Brazil the Spanish had already expelled the Dutch from the town.

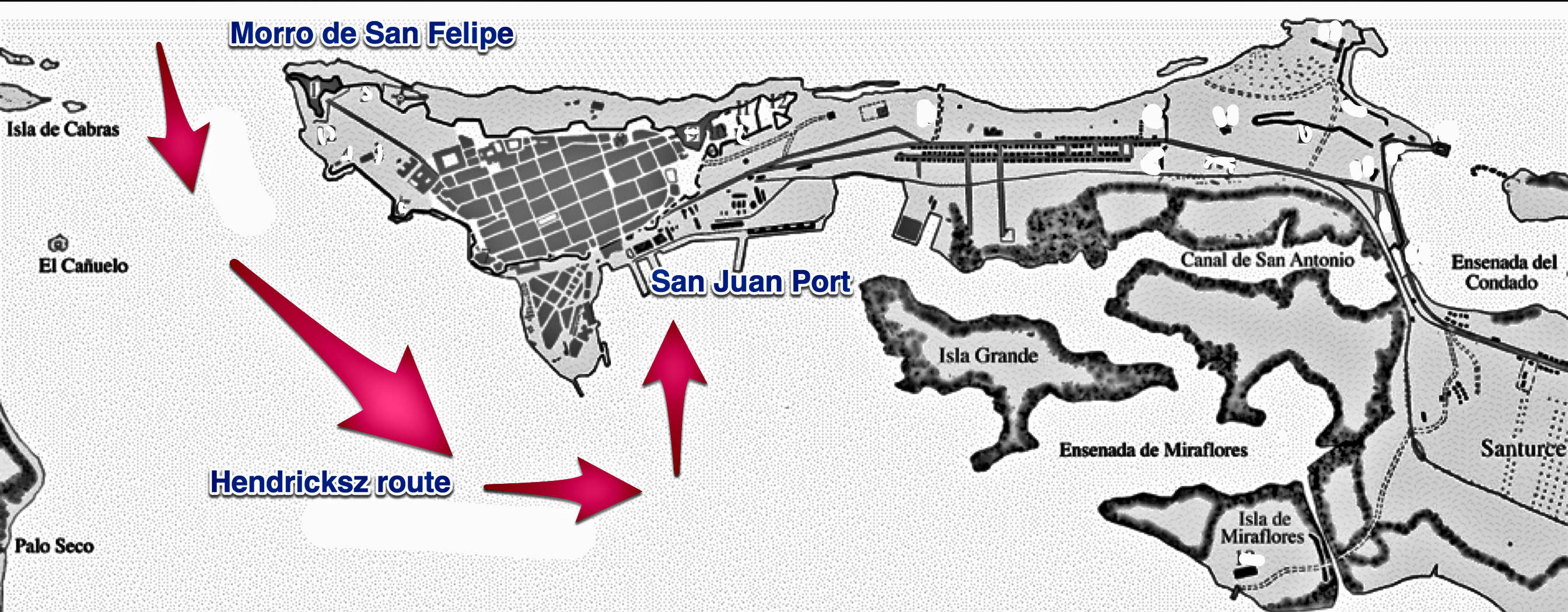
Hendricksz 1625 attack on San Juan, Puerto Rico

Several days after the Dutch surrender, a relief fleet of 33 ships under Admiral Boudewijn Hendricksz, seconded by Vice Admiral Andries Veron, bearded down upon the bay divided in two columns. Toledo, who was warned about its arrival, disposed 6 galleons to lure them to a murderous crossfire. However, seeing the large Spanish-Portuguese fleet anchored inside, Hendricksz decided to withdraw to open sea. Spanish warships attempted to pursue him but a galleon ran aground and the chase was abandoned. Hendricksz divided his fleet in three groups. One of them returned to Holland with the supplies and ammunition for the garrison of Salvador; the other two attacked respectively the Spanish Caribbean colonial town of San Juan de Puerto Rico and the Portuguese African trading post of the Castle of Elmina but were both decisively defeated.

The Dutch fleet then sailed to Paraíba where it was split into two. Half of the ships, commanded by Veront, sailed to Africa. The other 17 ships were commanded by Hendrijks himself, and went to Puerto Rico with the intention of capturing it.

On 24 September 1625, Hendrijks arrived at the coast of San Juan with 17 ships and 2,000 men and sent a message to the governor of Puerto Rico, Juan de Haro, ordering him to surrender the island. De Haro refused; he was an experienced military man and expected an attack in the section known as Boqueron. He therefore had that area fortified. However, the Dutch took another route and landed in La Puntilla.

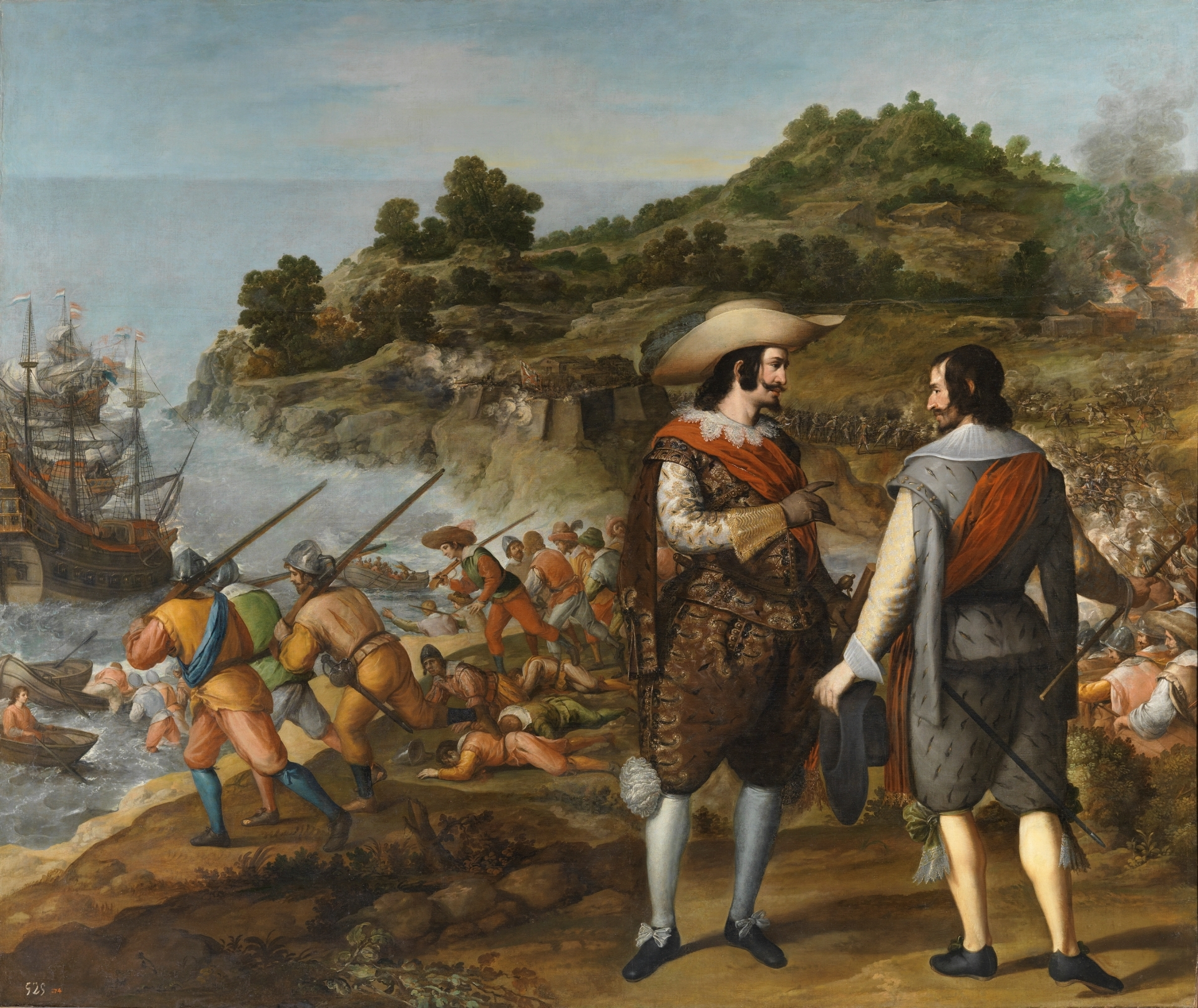
Seventeenth-century Spanish painting commemorating Hendricksz's defeat at San Juan de Puerto Rico; by Eugenio Caxés, Museo del Prado

De Haro realized that an invasion was inevitable and ordered Captain Juan de Amézqueta, plus 300 men stationed at "San Felipe del Morro Castle" (also known as "El Morro") and the city of San Juan evacuated. He also had former governor Juan de Vargas organize an armed resistance in the interior of the island. On September 25 Hendrijks attacked San Juan, besieging El Morro Castle and La Fortaleza (the Governor's Mansion). He invaded the capital city and set up his headquarters in La Fortaleza. The Dutch were counterattacked by Captain Juan de Amézqueta and 50 members of the civilian militia on land and by the cannons of the Spanish troops in El Morro Castle. The land battle left 60 Dutch soldiers dead and Hendrijks with a sword wound to his neck which he received from the hands of Amézqueta, who is considered as one of the best swordsman of the island.

The Dutch ships at sea were boarded by the Puerto Ricans who defeated the Dutch in the land battle. After a long battle, the Spanish soldiers and volunteers of the city's militia were able to defend the city from the attack and save the island from an invasion. On October 21, Enrico set La Fortaleza and the city ablaze. Captains Amézqueta and Andrés Botello decided to put a stop to the destruction and led 200 men in an attack against the enemy's front and rear guard. They drove Hendrijks and his men from their trenches and into the ocean in their haste to reach their ships.

Hendrijks, upon his retreat, would leave behind him one of his largest ships stranded and over 400 of his men dead. He then tried to invade the island by attacking the town of Aguada. He was again defeated by the local militia and abandoned the idea of invading Puerto Rico.

The privateer then went on to Santo Domingo, where he engaged another fort, and later sailed on to Margarita. On 22 February he arrived at Pampatar, which he took easily, and disembarked in a village now called Porlamar. But these limited successes did not recompense the outlay made in the equipping of his fleet.

He then decided to head to Havana, whose defenses he studied for some time, until he ultimately decided that it was folly to try to take it. He then travelled on to Matanzas and landed in Cabañas, where he provisioned. There he fell ill and died on 2 July 1626. His fleet returned to Holland, and only 700 of the 1,500 men who had attacked Puerto Rico returned alive.
