= Castillo San Felipe del Morro =

16th-century fortress and citadel in Puerto Rico

- El Morro
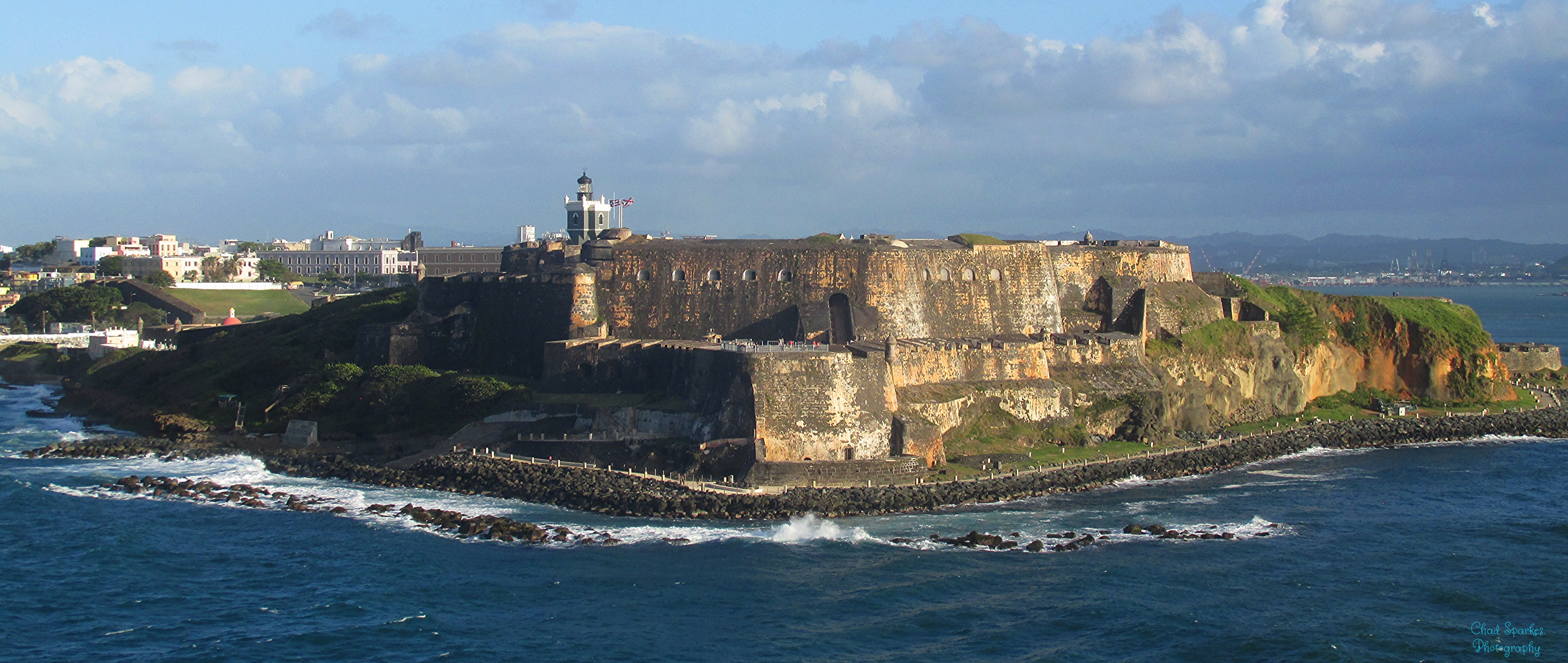
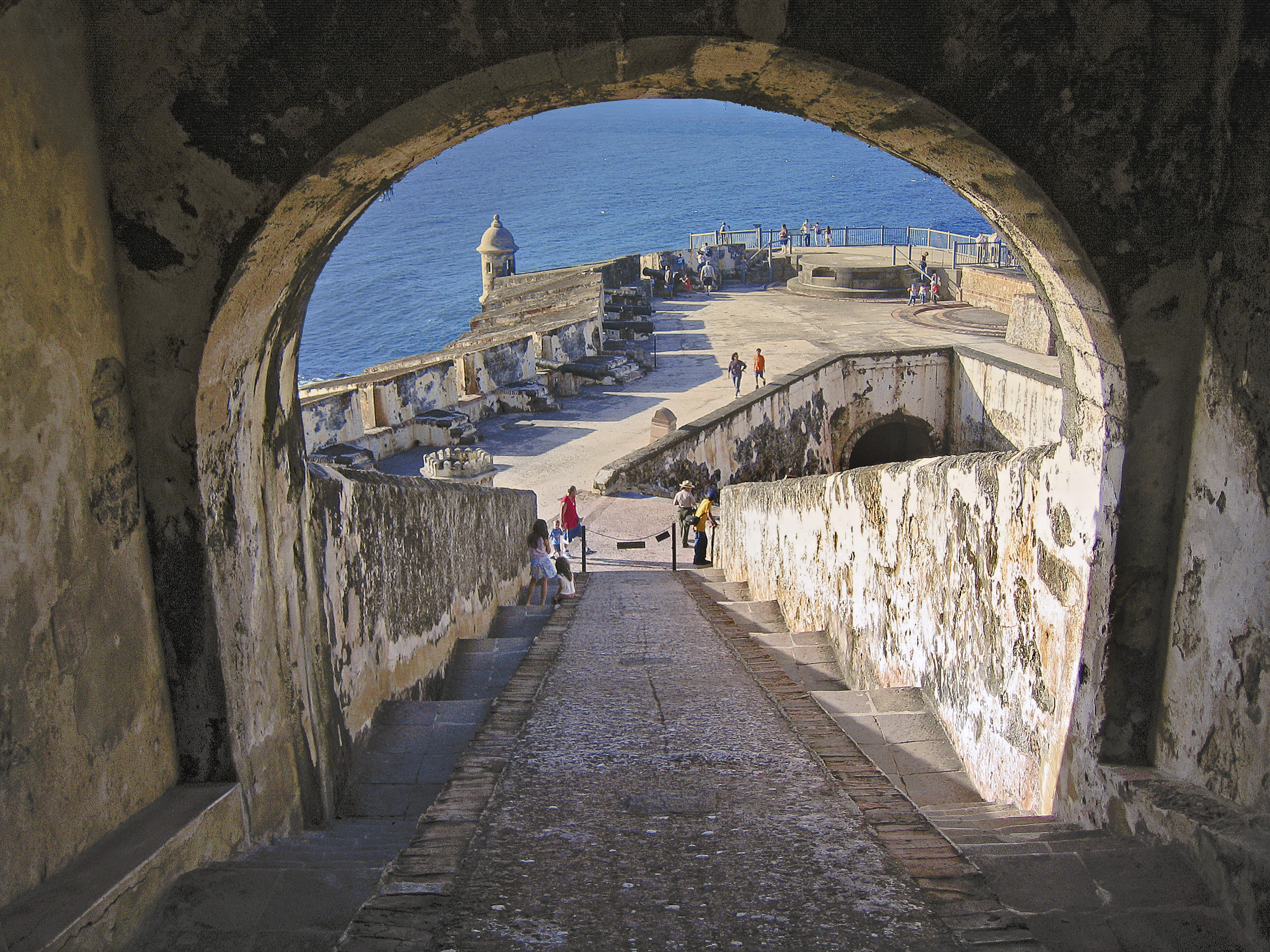
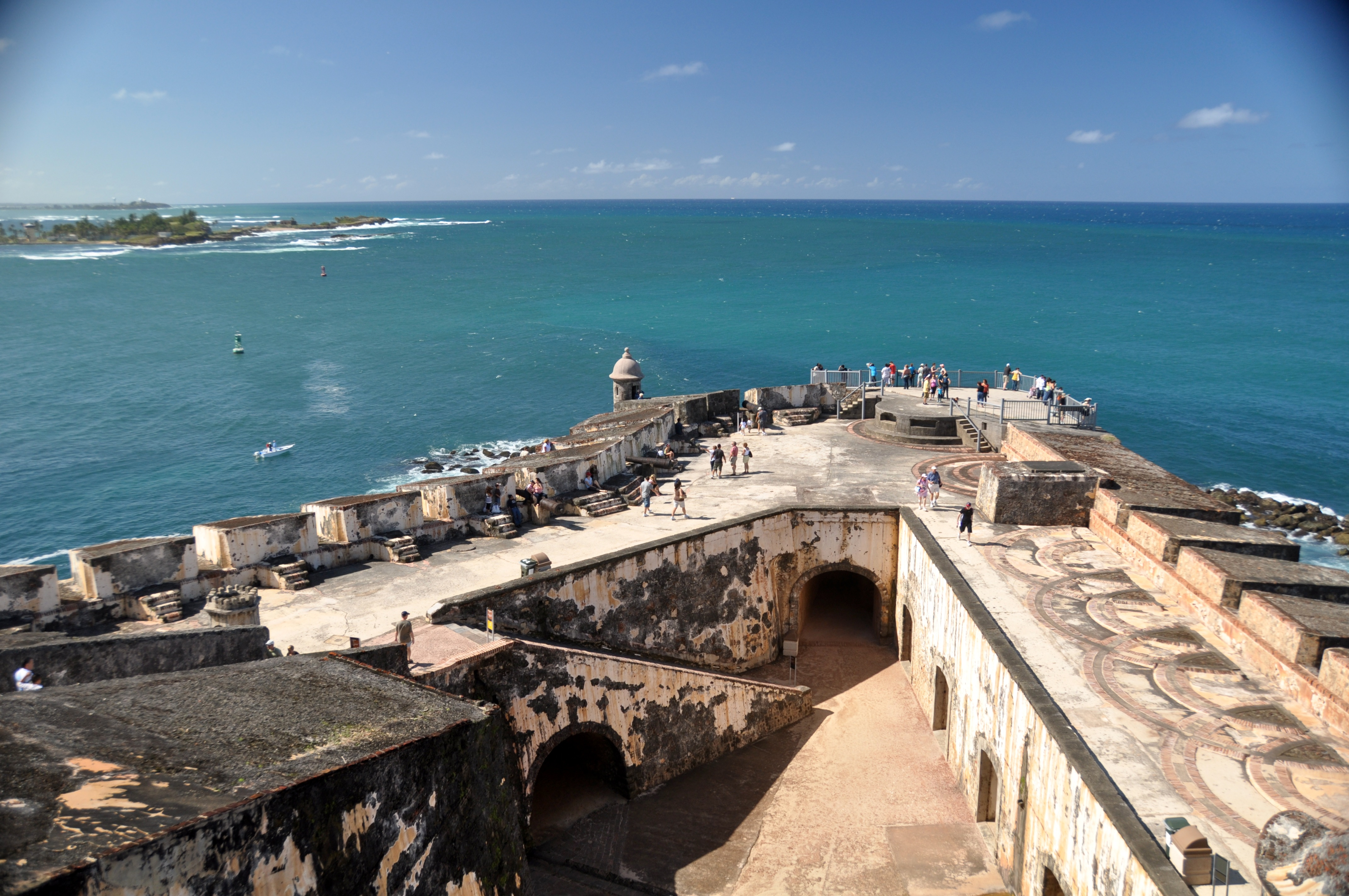
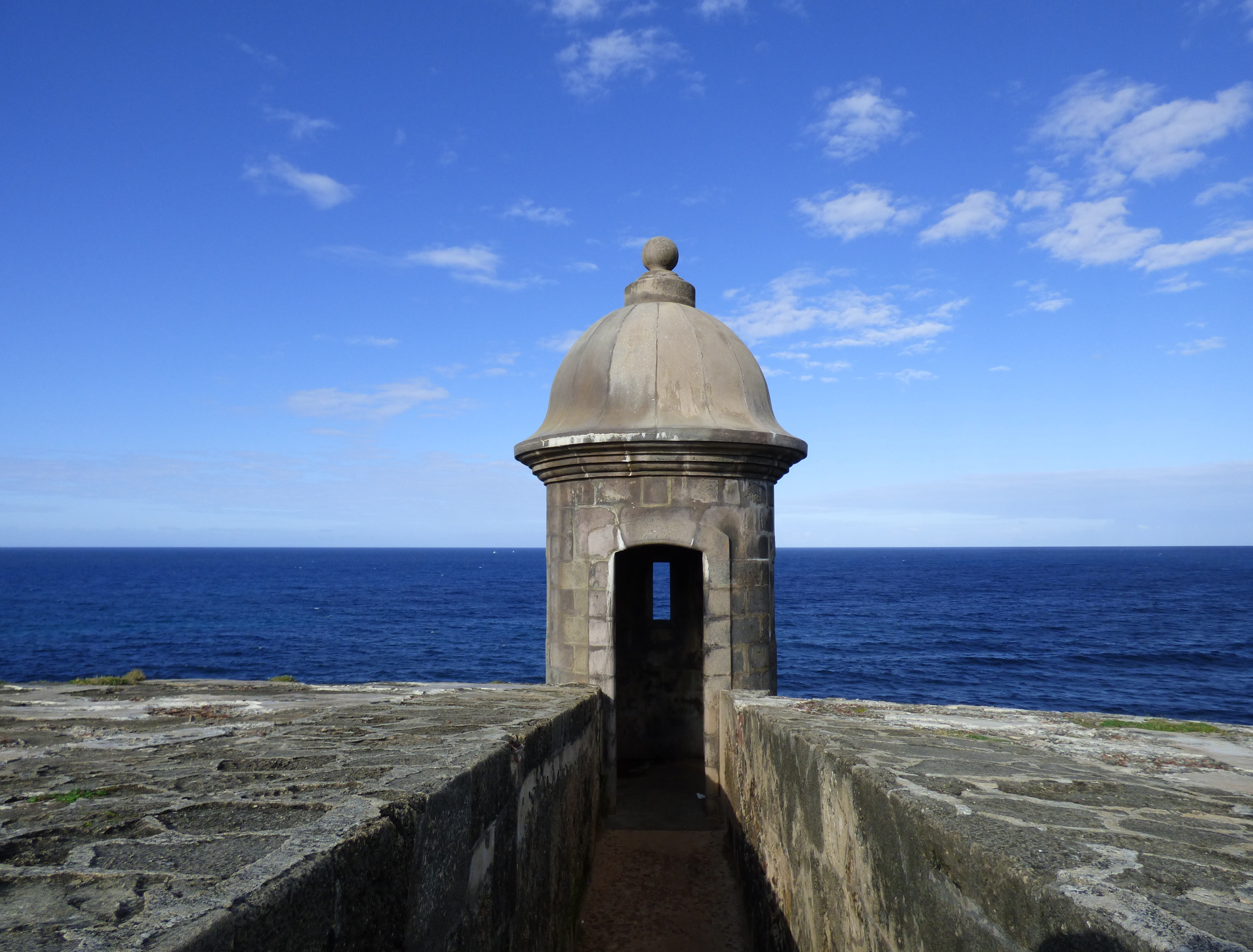
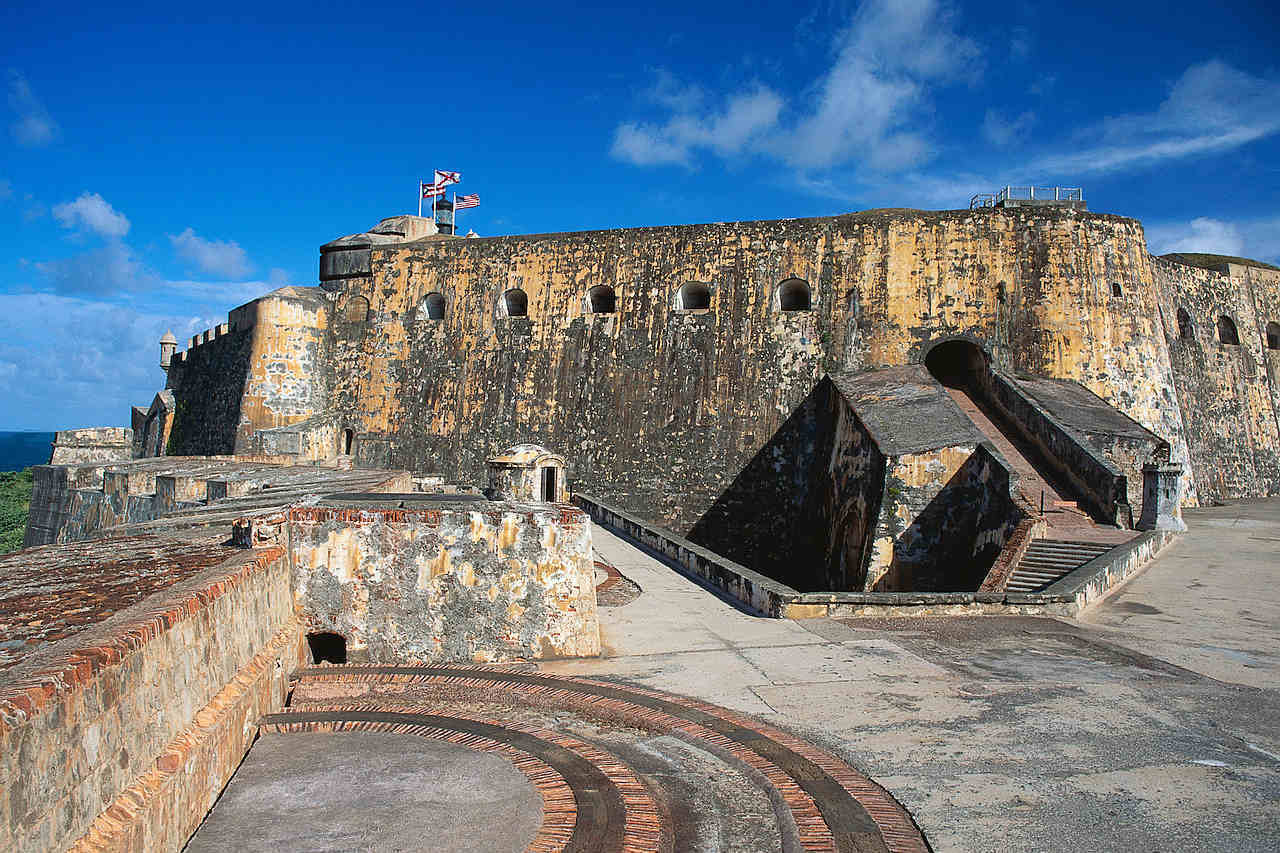
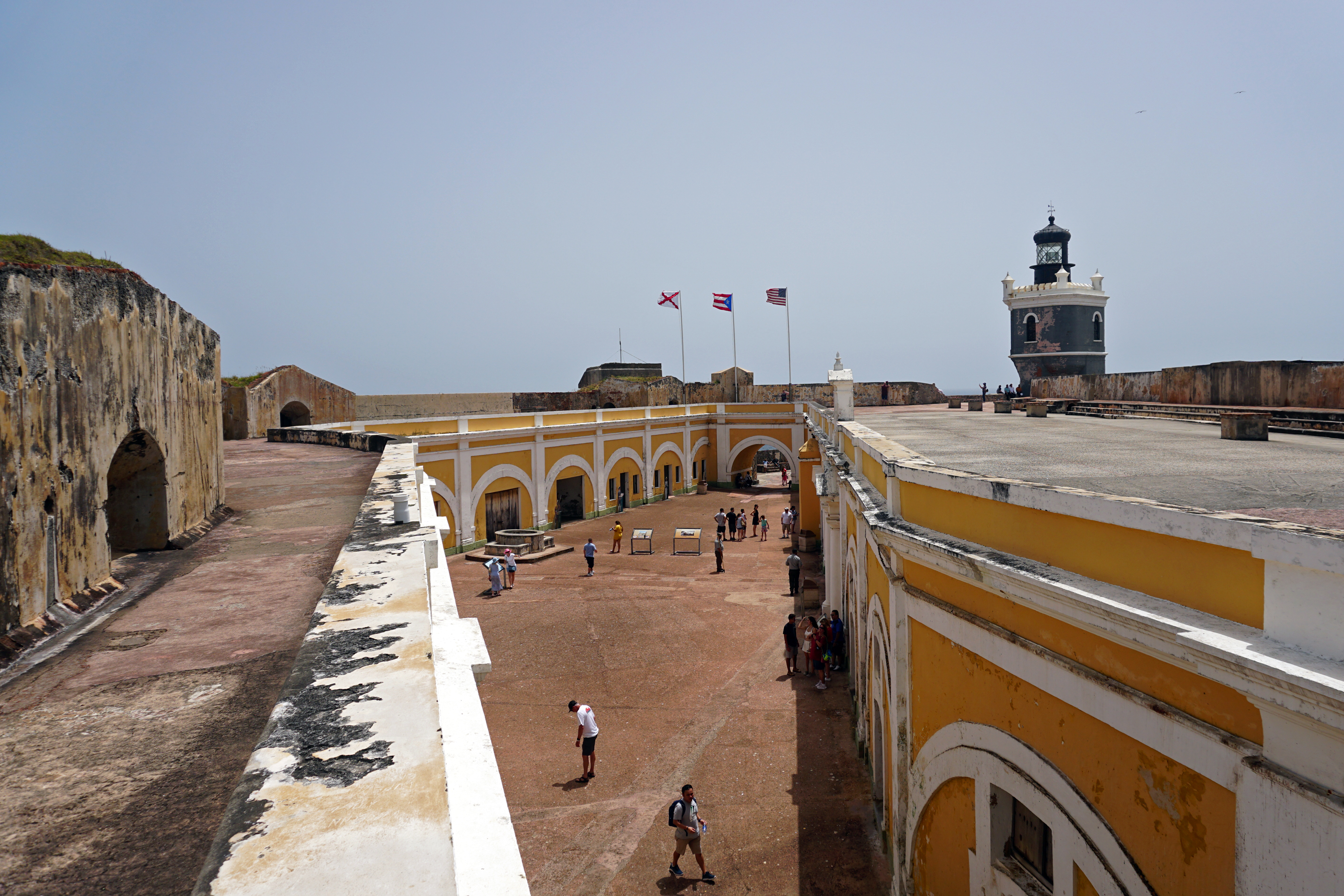
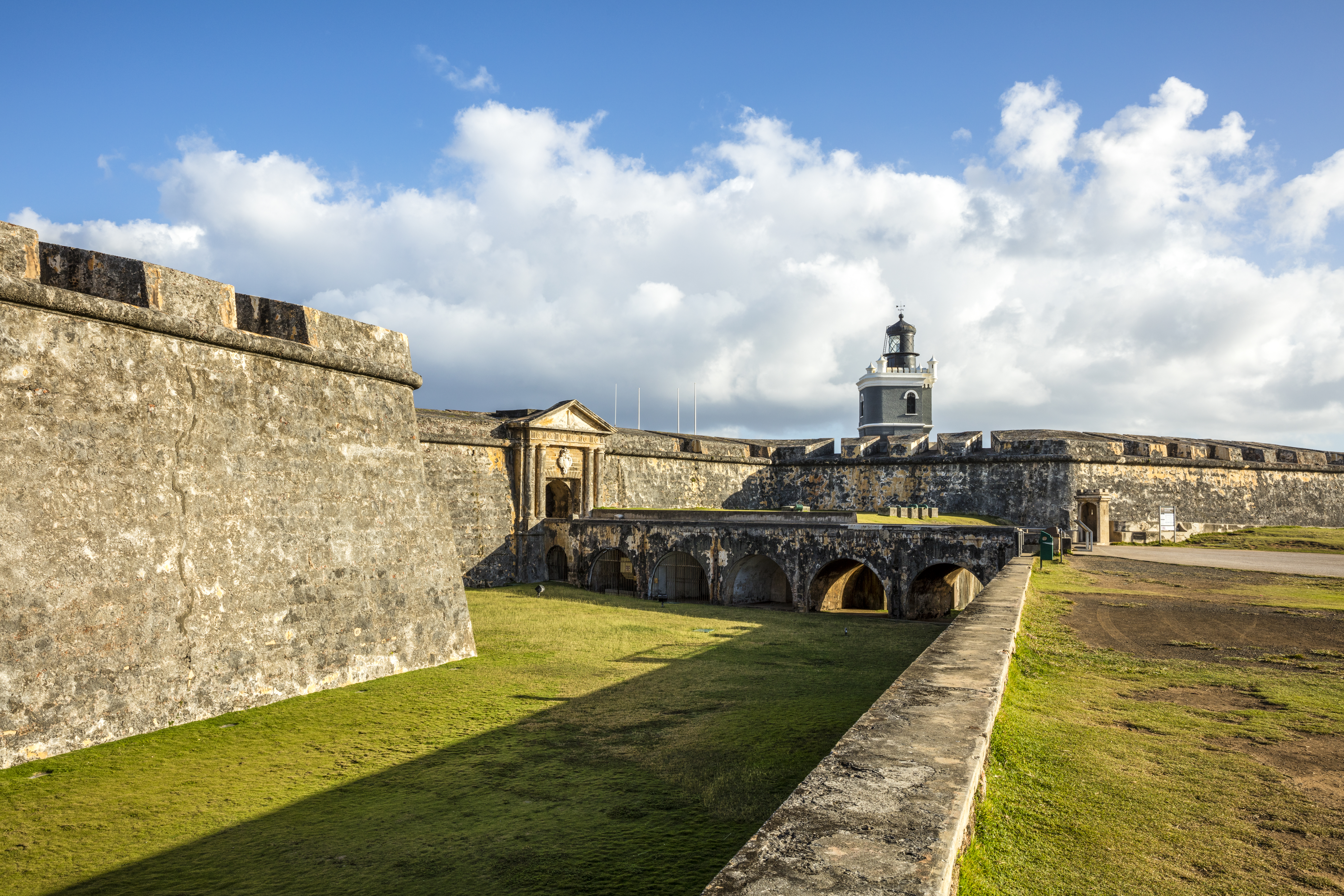
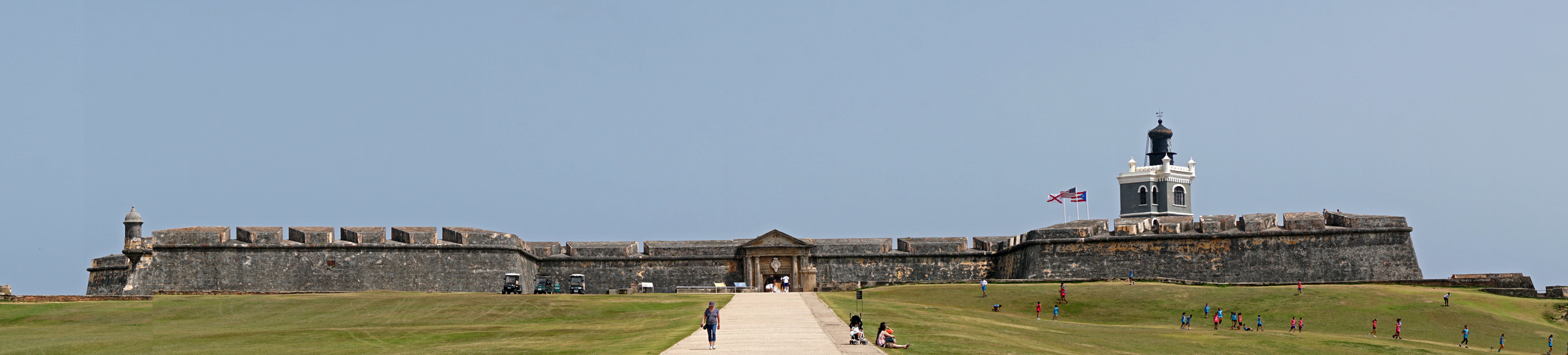
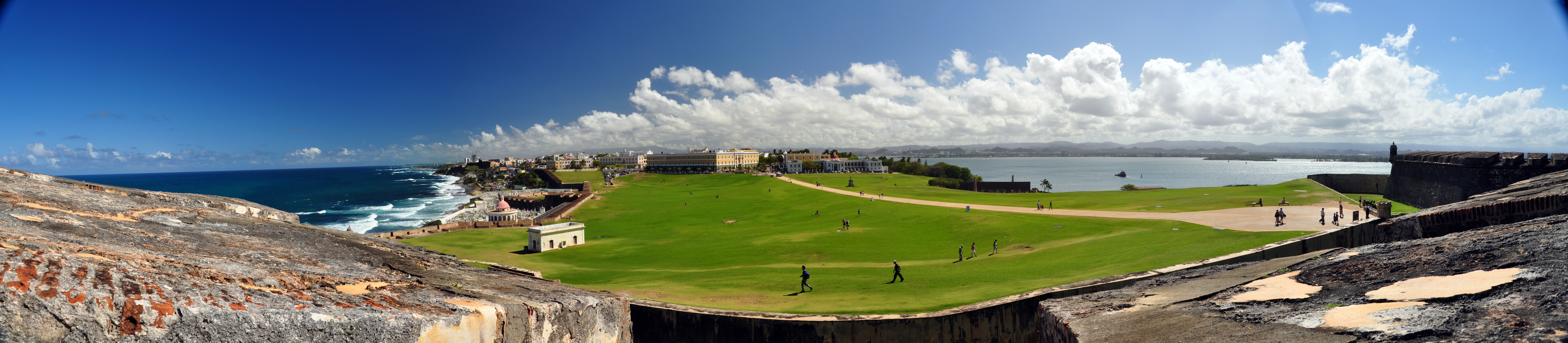
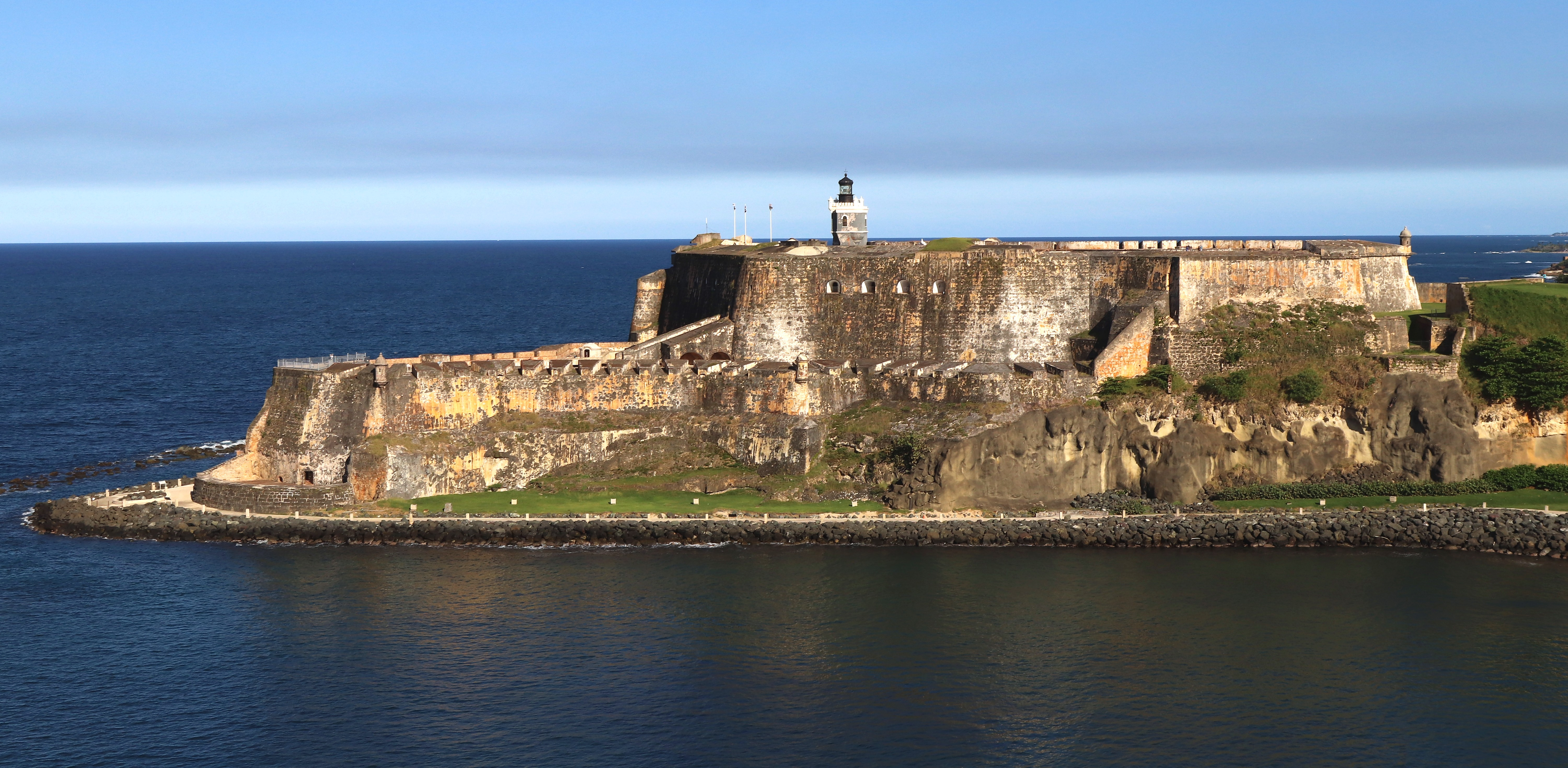
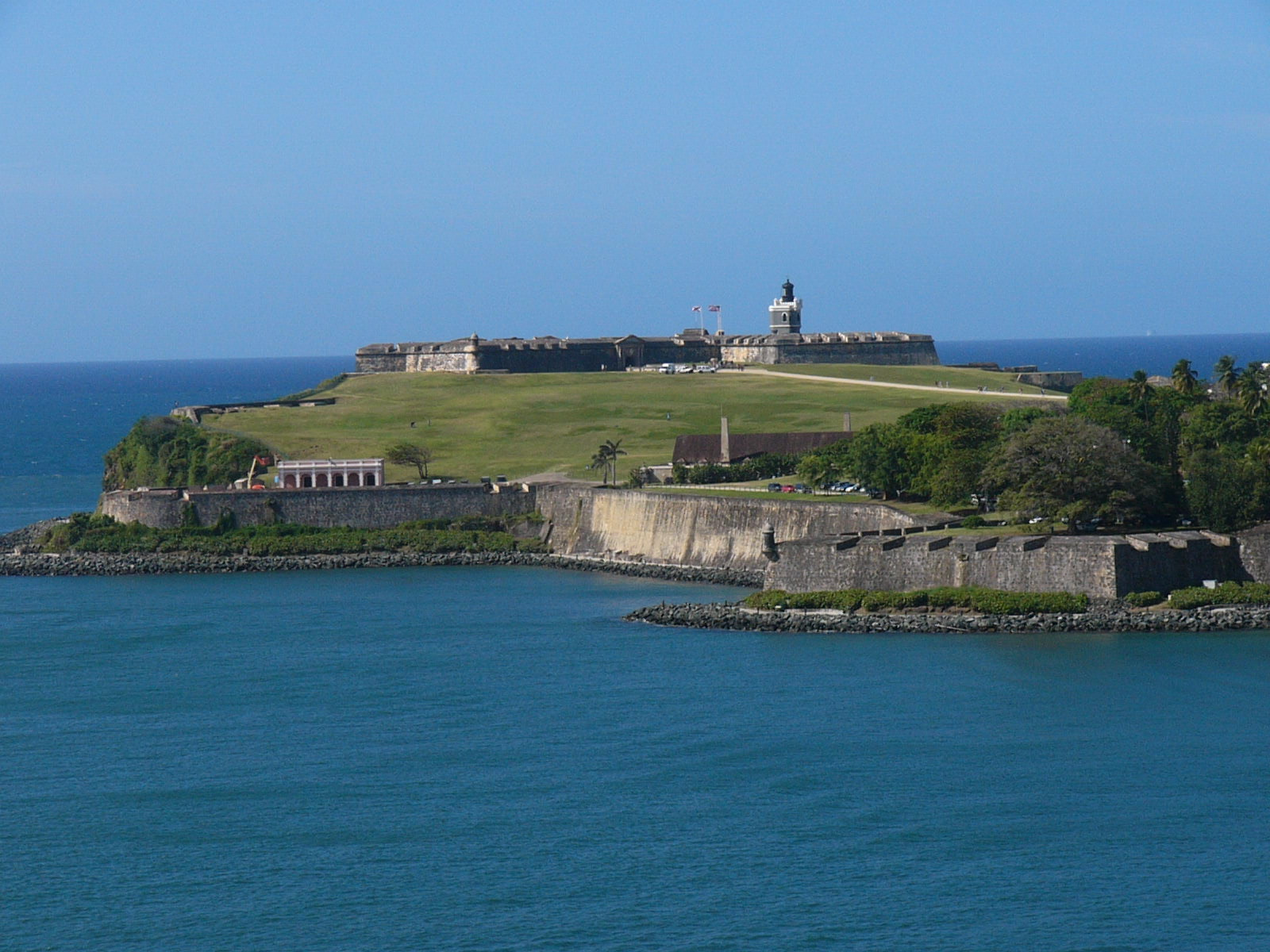
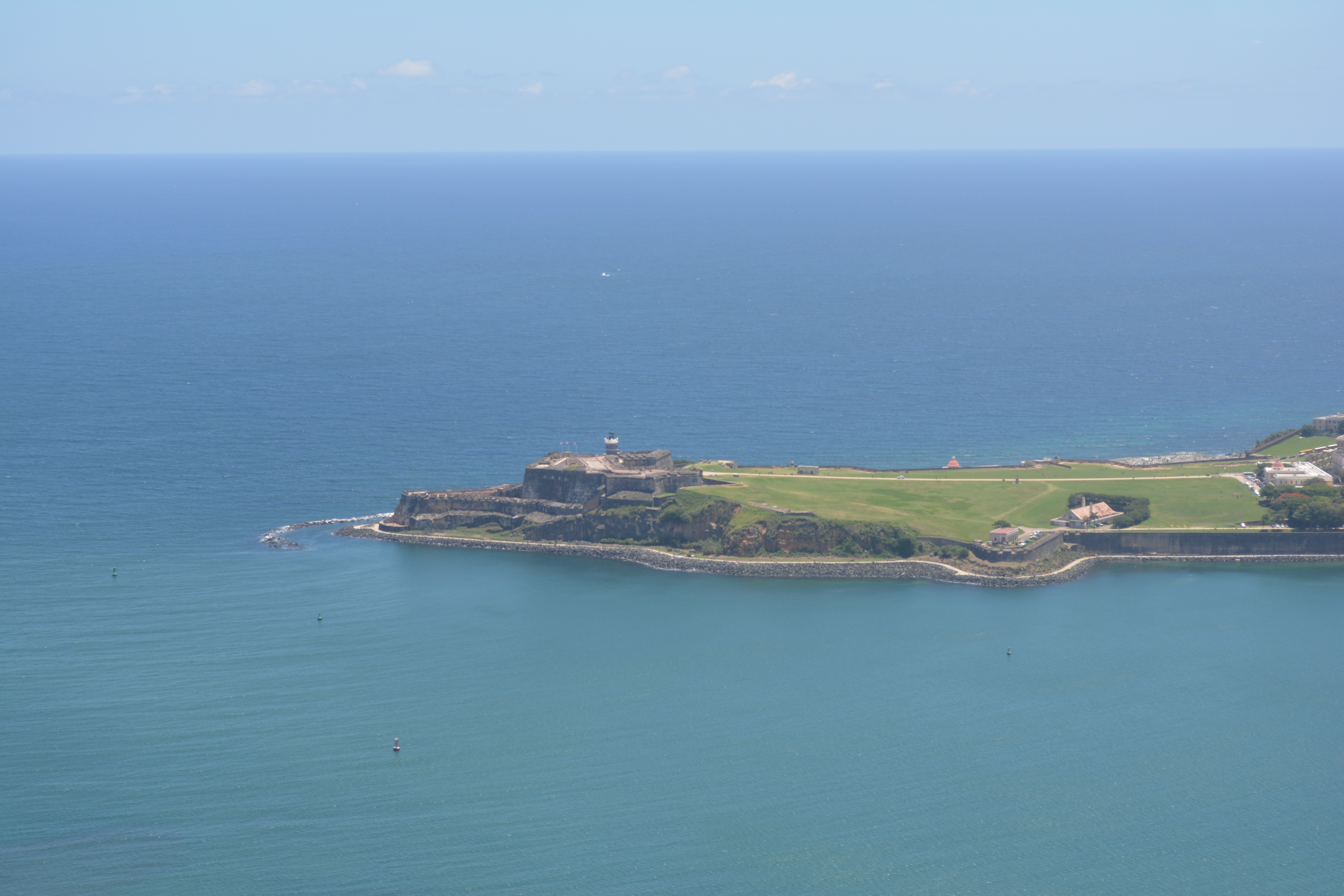
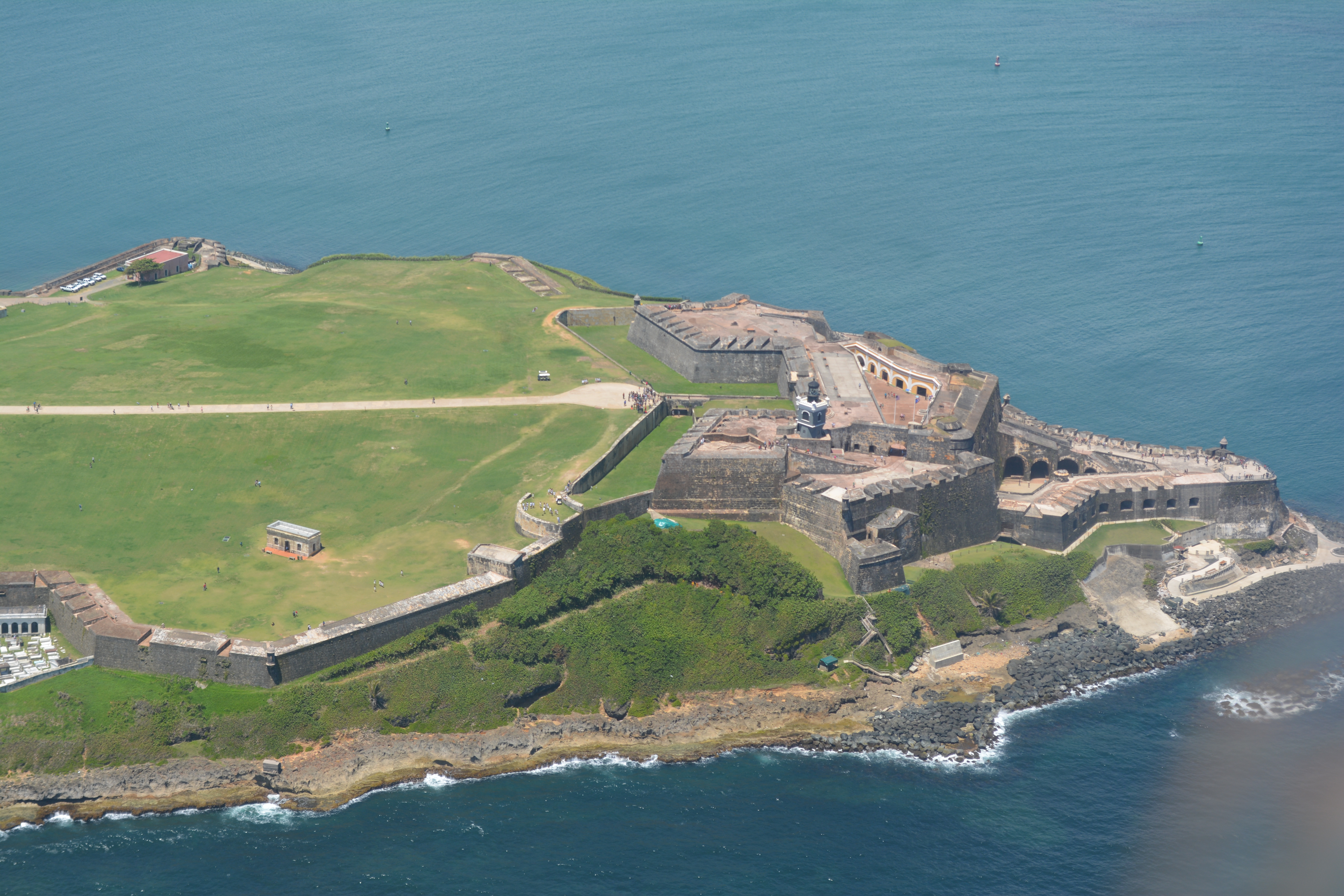
- From top, left to right: Front of El Morro from the Atlantic; inside from fourth level inner bailey onto ramp to third-level battlements; panorama from fourth-level onto San Juan Bay, Isla de Cabras, and Ocean; garita or bartizan overlooking the Atlantic; inside view from fourth-level surrounding outer bailey onto ramp to fifth-level inner bailey with sentry boxes visible; inside main courtyard or inner bailey on fifth-level; entrance from dry moat onto curtain wall, drawbridge, hornwork gate, and lighthouse; entrance from Calle del Morro esplanade onto glacis; panorama from El Morro onto Old San Juan with Santa María Magdalena de Pazzis Cemetery and La Perla historic shanty town outside the northern section of the Walls of Old San Juan; profile from opening of Bay next to Paseo del Morro; entrance from middle of Bay onto western section of the Walls of Old San Juan; aerial from middle of Bay; and aerial from the Atlantic
- Interactive

General information
- Type: Medieval fortification, Citadel, Promontory fort
- Architectural style: Classical architecture
- Location: San Juan Islet, Old San Juan, Puerto Rico, 501 Calle Norzagaray, Old San Juan, San Juan, PR, 00901
- Coordinates: 18°28′15″N 66°7′27″W
- Construction started: 1539
- Completed: 1787

Height
- Height: 43 metres (140 ft)

Dimensions
- Diameter: 5.5 to 6.1 metres (18 to 20 ft) thick walls

Technical details
- Material: Sandstone, Brick, Sand, Clay
- Size: 28 hectares (70 acres), including Calle del Morro esplanade
- Floor count: 6 levels

Design and construction
- Engineer: Juan de Tejada, Juan Bautista Antonelli (1587); Alejandro O'Reilly, Thomas O’Daly (1765)
- Known for: Battle of San Juan (1595) Battle of San Juan (1598) Battle of San Juan (1625) Battle of San Juan (1797) Bombardment of San Juan (1898)

UNESCO World Heritage Site
- Type: Cultural
- Criteria: vi
- Designated: 1983 (7th session)
- Part of: La Fortaleza and San Juan National Historic Site in Puerto Rico
- Reference no.: 266
- Region: The Americas

U.S. National Register of Historic Places
- Designated: October 15, 1966
- Part of: San Juan National Historic Site
- Reference no.: 66000930

Castillo San Felipe del Morro (English: Promontory Castle of Saint Philip), most commonly known as El Morro (The Promontory), is a large fortress and citadel in the Old San Juan historic quarter of San Juan, the capital city and municipality of Puerto Rico. Commissioned by King Charles I of Spain in 1539, it was first built as a fortified tower in honor of King Philip II, who oversaw its expansion into a hornwork bastion fort by 1595. Over the next 200 years, especially in the reign of King Charles III, El Morro continued to be developed to reach its current form in 1787. Rising 43 metres (140 ft) from the Atlantic shoreline with 5.5 to 7.6 metres (18 to 25 ft) thick walls, the six-leveled edifice stands on a steep, rocky headland promontory on San Juan Islet guarding the entry to San Juan Bay, the harbor of Old San Juan. El Morro, alongside La Fortaleza, San Cristóbal, El Cañuelo, and other forts part of the Walls of Old San Juan, protected strategically and militarily important Puerto Rico, or La Llave de las Indias (The Key to the Indies), from invasion by competing world powers during the Age of Discovery and Sail. It was designated a World Heritage Site by UNESCO in 1983.

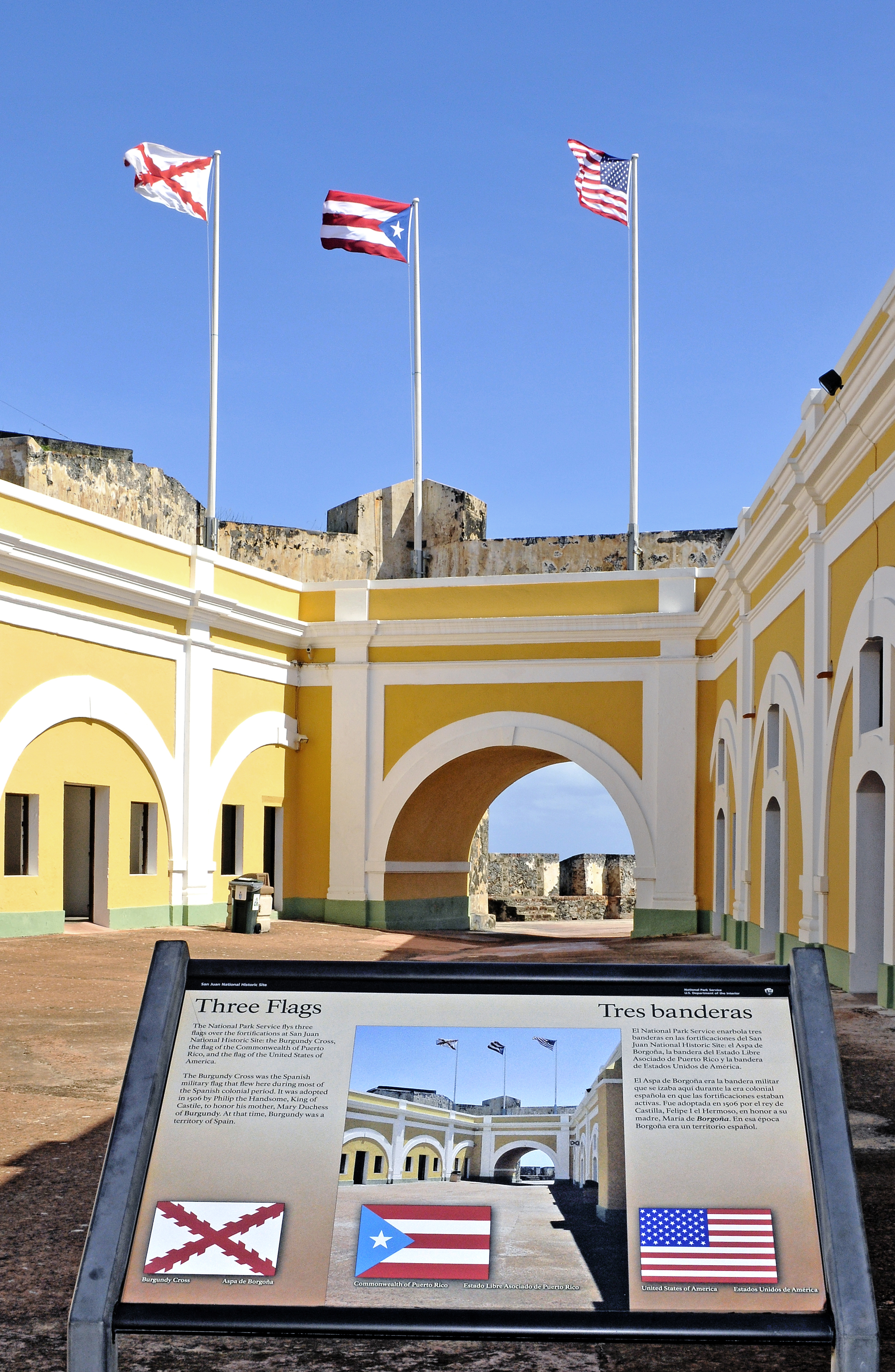
The Cross of Burgundy of the Spanish Empire, the Monoestrellada of Puerto Rico, and the Stars and Stripes of the United States fly continuously on El Morro

== Development ==
Lying on the northwesternmost point of the islet of Old San Juan, Castillo San Felipe del Morro is named in honor of King Philip II of Spain. The fortification, also referred to as el Morro or 'the promontory,' was designed to guard the entrance to the San Juan Bay, and defend the Spanish colonial port city of San Juan from seaborne enemies.

In 1983, the citadel was declared a World Heritage Site by the United Nations in conjunction with the San Juan National Historic Site. Over two million visitors a year explore the castillo, making it one of Puerto Rico's leading tourist attractions. Facing the structure, on the opposite side of the bay, a smaller fortification known as El Cañuelo complemented the castillo's defense of the entrance to the bay.

== Structure for deployment ==
Architectural drawings produced in the HABS San Juan, Puerto Rico field office

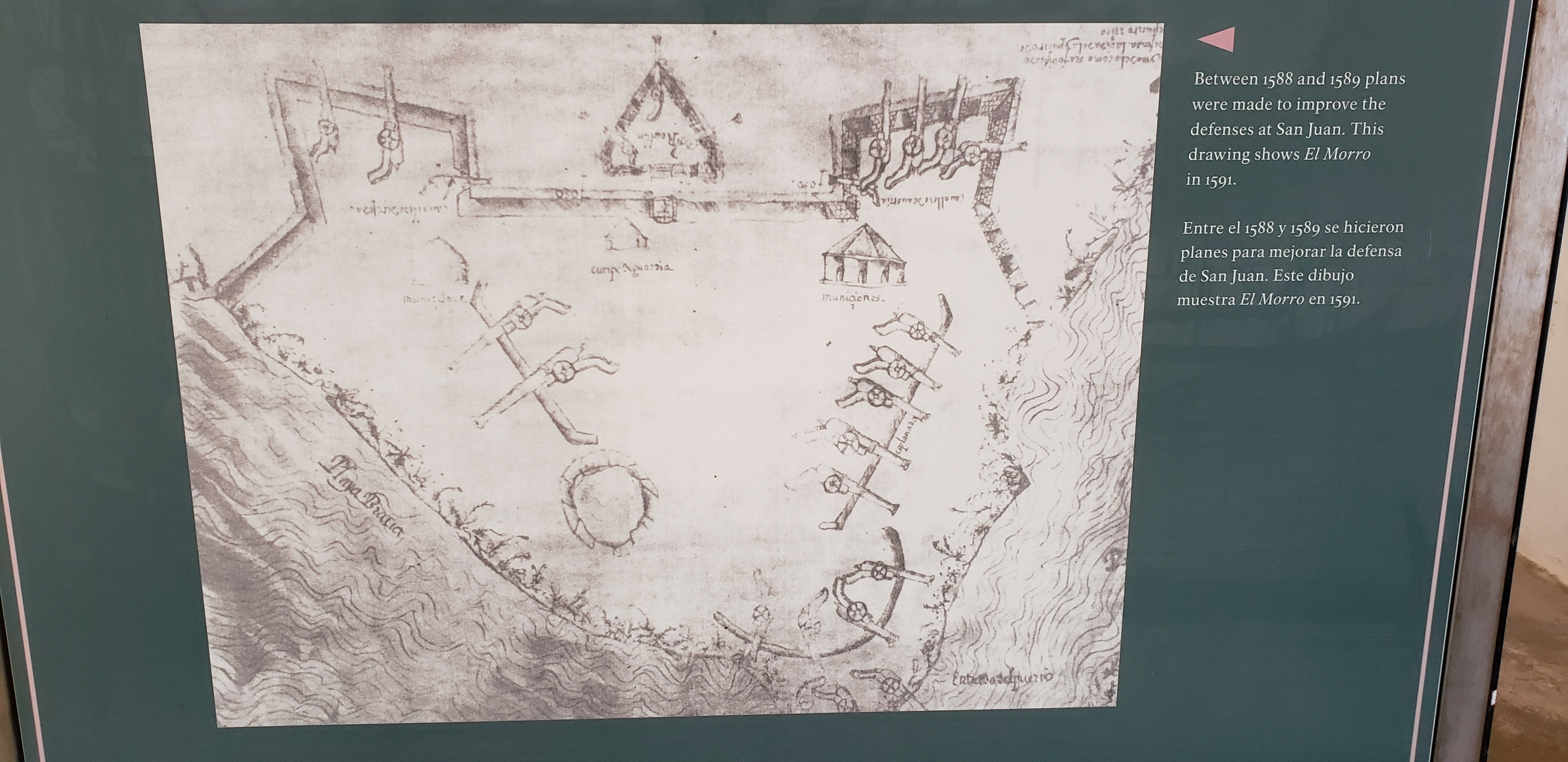
El Morro in 1591

The construction of the citadel and its surrounding walls began in 1539 on orders of King Charles V of Spain. The original fortress was built under the direction of conquistador Diego Ramos de Orozco and its main purpose was to defend the port of San Juan by controlling the entry to its harbor. In order to have a viable defense while the rest of the fort was being completed, a small proto-fortress was erected during the first year of construction. It is estimated that this section comprises about 10% of the whole structure.

It was not till 1587, however, that Field Marshal Juan de Tejeda and the Italian engineer-architect Bautista Antonelli drew the fort's final design. The plan, which was based on the then firmly established Spanish military fortification principles of the time, included fortifying nine other sites in the Spanish Main and Spanish West Indies: Santo Domingo, Santa Marta, Cartagena, Nombre de Dios, Portobelo, the Chagres River, Panama City, Havana, and St. Augustine. San Juan construction began in March 1589 with skilled artisans, 12 stonecutters, 18 masons, 2 smiths, a cooper, metal founder, and an overseer assigned to the task, with the help of 150 slaves. Captain General Diego Menéndez de Valdés, who was the governor of Puerto Rico, took over construction after Tejeda and Antonelli left to start construction of Santo Domingo's fortifications. Capt. Pedro de Salazar took over construction in 1591.

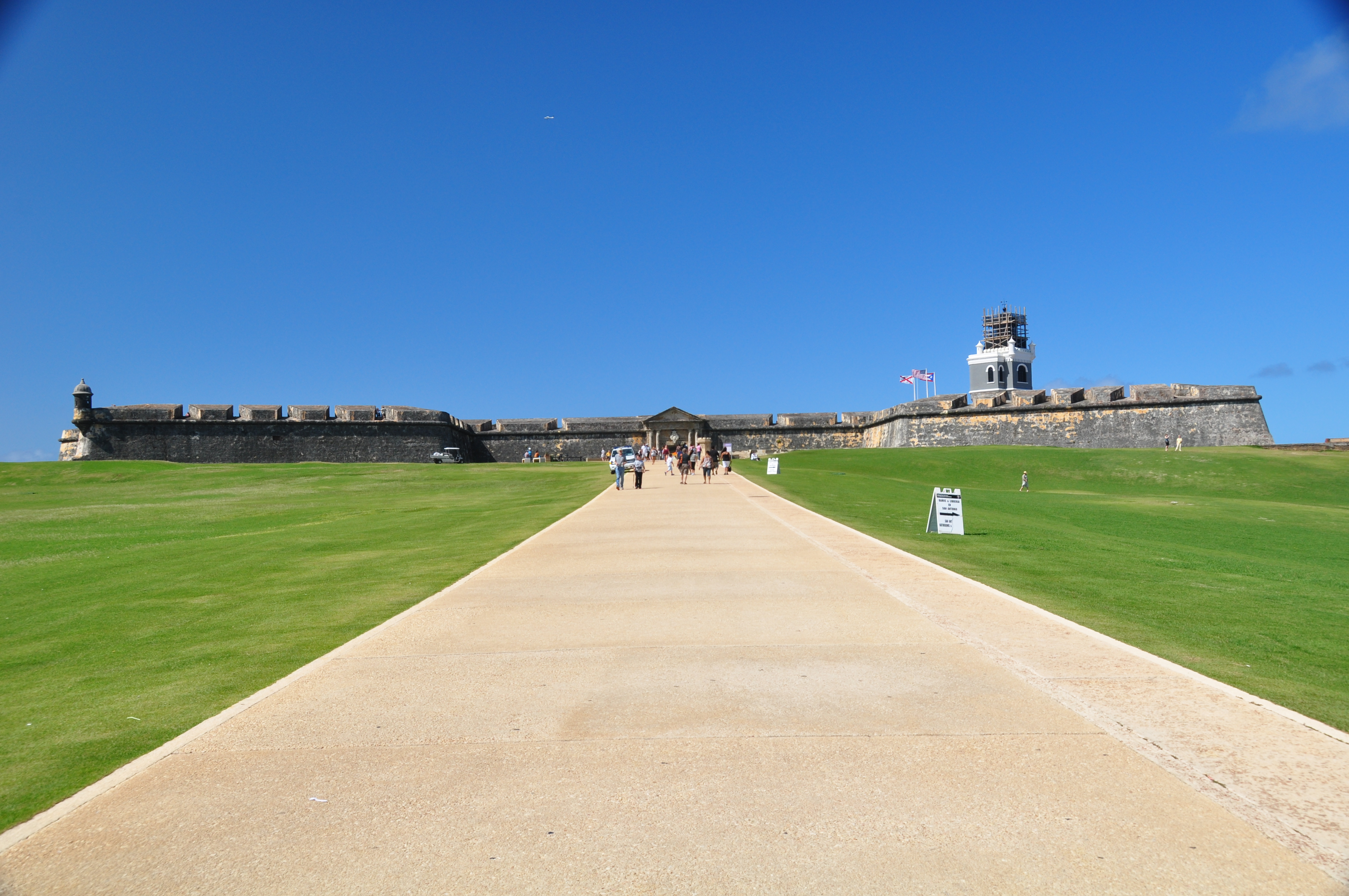
View of El Morro's entrance

The new fortifications consisted of a hornwork, crossing the headland, to protect the landward side of the existing tower and water battery. Two half-bastions, one on the Atlantic side called "Tejeda", and another on the harbor side called "Austria", were connected by a curtain wall fronted by a moat, and spanned by a drawbridge in the center. The gate and drawbridge were protected by a ravelin, and just inside the gate was a guardhouse. A pair of batteries behind the hornwork overlooked the sea and harbor.

In 1634, construction of the city walls surrounding San Juan began. By 1650, the town was enclosed on the east, south and west, while natural battlements protected the city along the Atlantic.

In 1765, Alejandro O'Reilly, Inspector General of Cuba, and Colonel Tomás O'Daly, San Juan Chief of Engineers, agreed on a plan to strengthen San Juan's defenses, which was approved by Charles III of Spain. San Juan became a Defense of the First Order, and one of the most powerful plazas in the Americas by 1790. El Morro's improvements included three cisterns under the main plaza containing 820,000 litres (216,000 US gal) of water collected from times of rain. The walls were strengthened to be 5.5 to 12.2 metres (18 to 40 ft) thick. These walls consisted of limestone and sandstone blocks forming the exterior and interior, with rubble sandwiched in between. The Santa Bárbara battery became the main battery with 37 cannon, supported by casemate guns at a lower level, and backed by a great wall with casemates at a higher level.

The top of the Castillo de San Felipe del Morro Lighthouse was destroyed during the 1898 bombardment of the city by the United States, and the American flag replaced the Spanish on 18 November 1898.

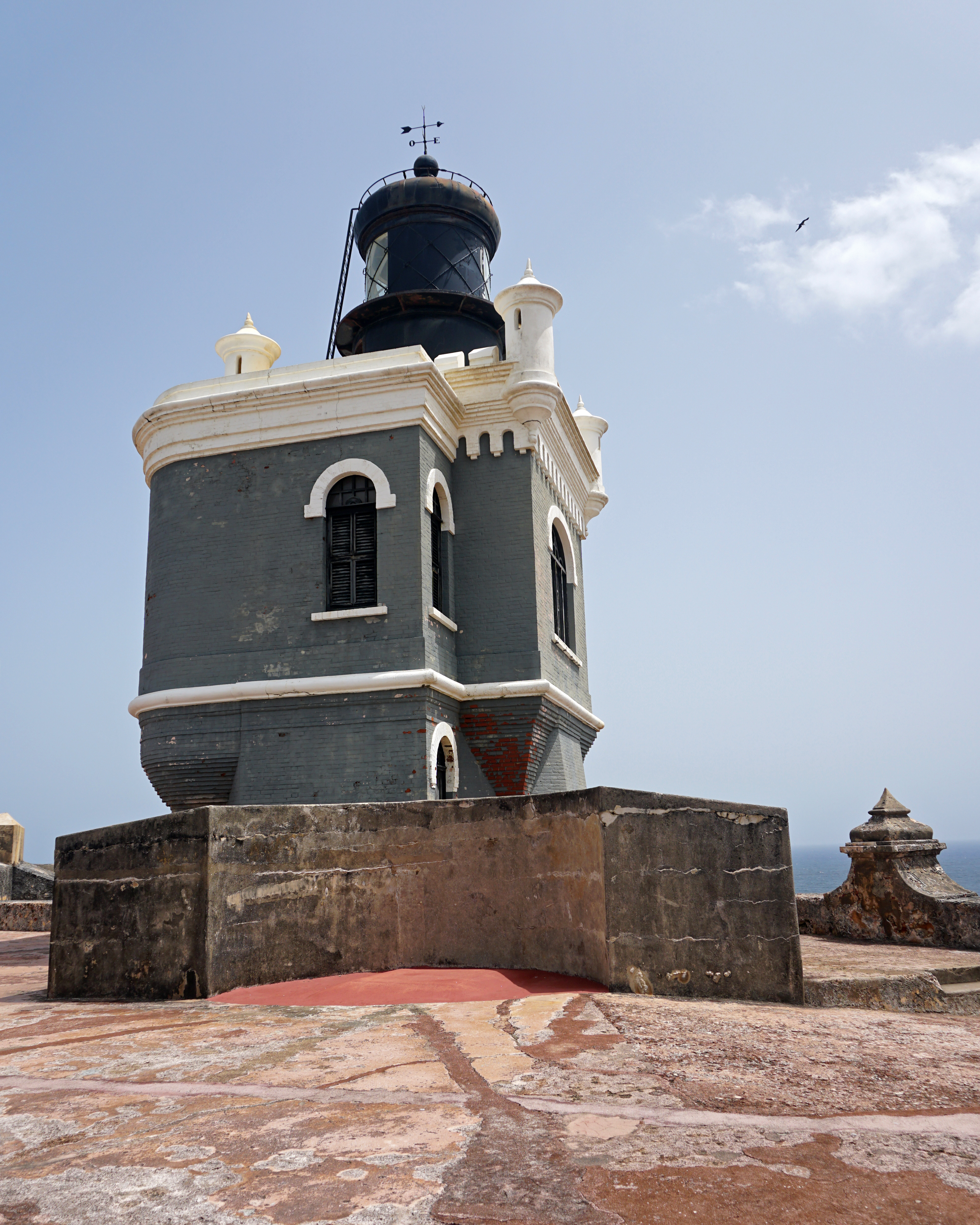
The lighthouse in El Morro, level 6

== History ==
=== Spanish Rule (1539–1898) ===
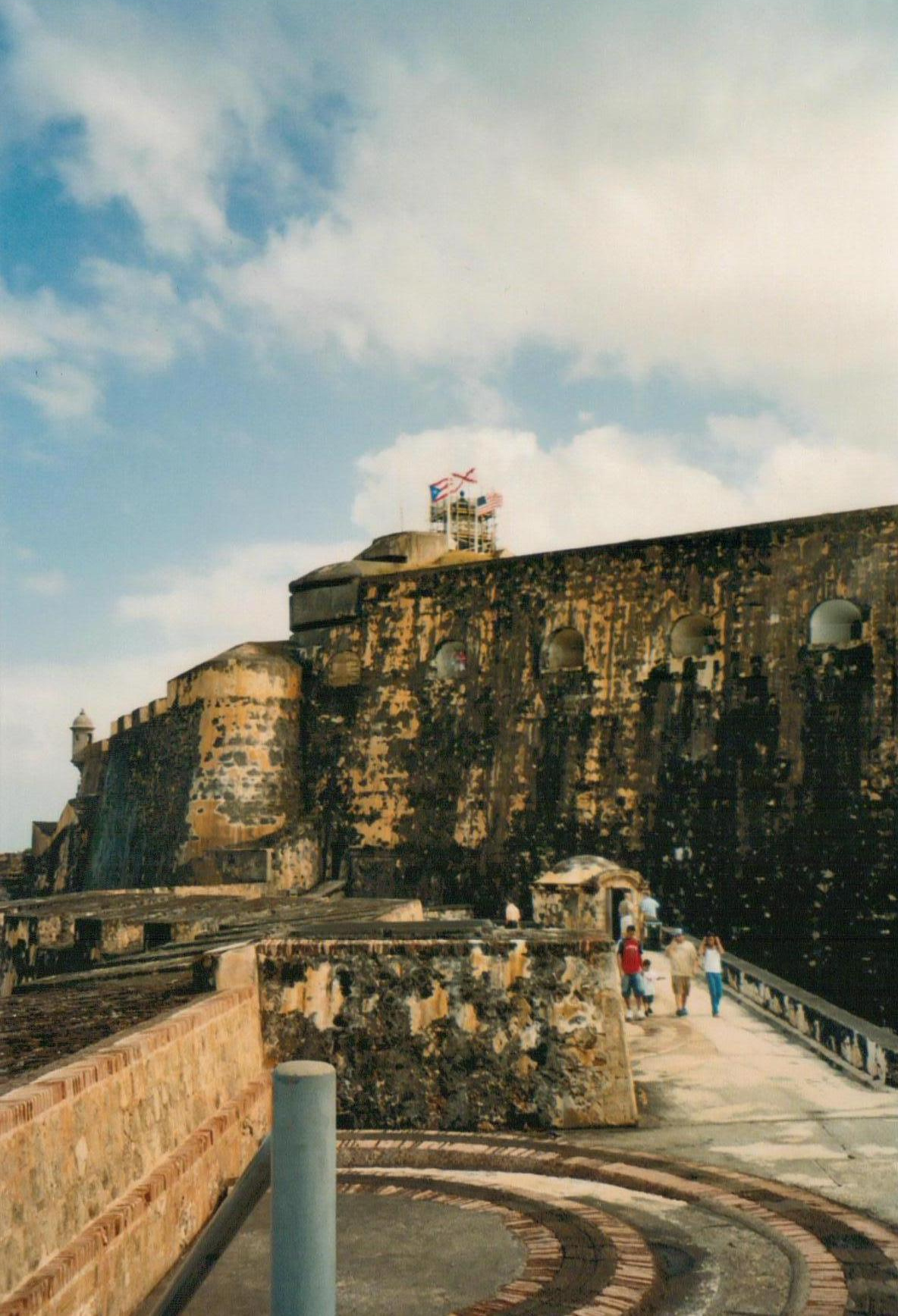
El Morro

Upon the advice of Gonzalo Fernández de Oviedo y Valdés, a battery was constructed on the rocky promontory called "the Morro", when the location of La Fortaleza was deemed unsuitable. This battery consisted of a tower with 4 embrasures, and a Water Battery at the foot of the slope for 3 guns. By 1555, Morro had 8 bronze cannons, as a defense against French privateers.

During the Spanish government of the island, El Morro, also known as Castillo de San Felipe, survived several attacks from foreign powers on various occasions.

In 1593 Portuguese soldiers, sent from Lisbon by order of Phillip II, composed the first garrison of the San Felipe del Morro fortress in Puerto Rico. Some brought their wives, while others married Puerto Rican women, and today there are many Puerto Rican families with Portuguese last names.

In 1595, Englishman Sir Francis Drake unsuccessfully attacked San Juan with his fleet in the Battle of San Juan (1595).

In 1598, the English attacked again, led by George Clifford, 3rd Earl of Cumberland. Clifford succeeded because he attacked San Juan over land instead of trying to enter through the San Juan Bay. However, an epidemic of dysentery forced him to flee the island after the Battle of San Juan (1598).

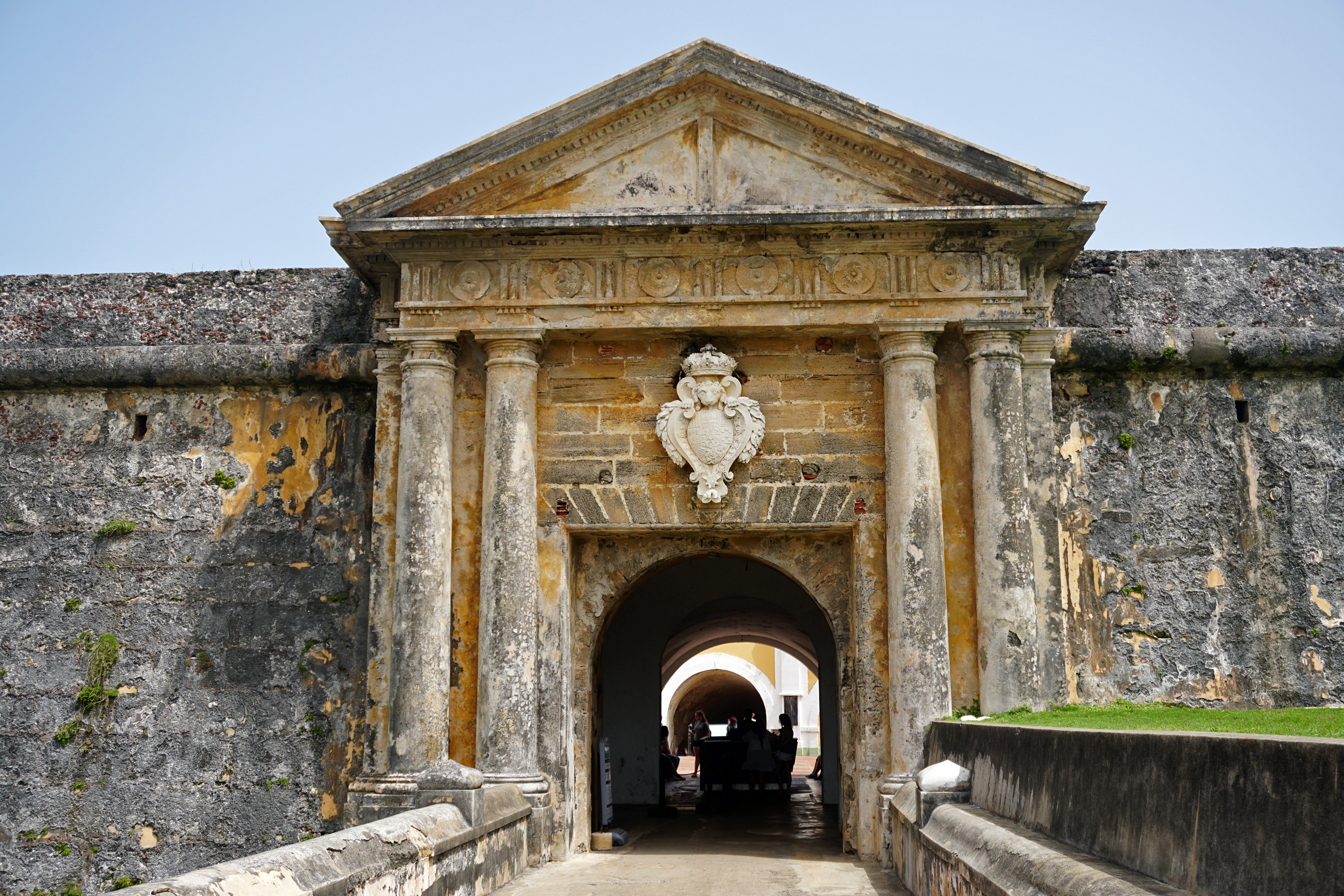
Main gate of the castle

In 1625, the Dutch, led by Boudewijn Hendricksz, also attacked the island emulating George Clifford's overland invasion. To the amazement of the citizens, the invaders were able to pass in front of the castle's defenders and into the harbor, out of reach of the city's cannons. El Morro managed to resist the siege and eventually made the Dutch retire, although the attackers were able to sack and burn the city before leaving the Battle of San Juan (1625).

In 1797, British General Ralph Abercromby and Admiral Henry Harvey, with a force of 7,000–13,000 men, invaded the island of Puerto Rico. Captain General Don Ramón de Castro and his forces repelled the attack. Abercromby and Harvey were defeated in the Battle of San Juan (1797).

El Morro's last active fight occurred during a naval bombardment by the United States Navy during the 1898 Spanish–American War, ending the age of naval warfare in the Caribbean, at least in the classical sense. During the Spanish–American War, the castle was attacked at least three times by American naval forces, the largest being the Bombardment of San Juan on May 12, 1898. The war ended with the signing of the Treaty of Paris, in which Spain ceded ownership of the islands of Puerto Rico, Cuba, Guam, and the Philippines to the United States.

=== American military occupation (1898–1961) ===
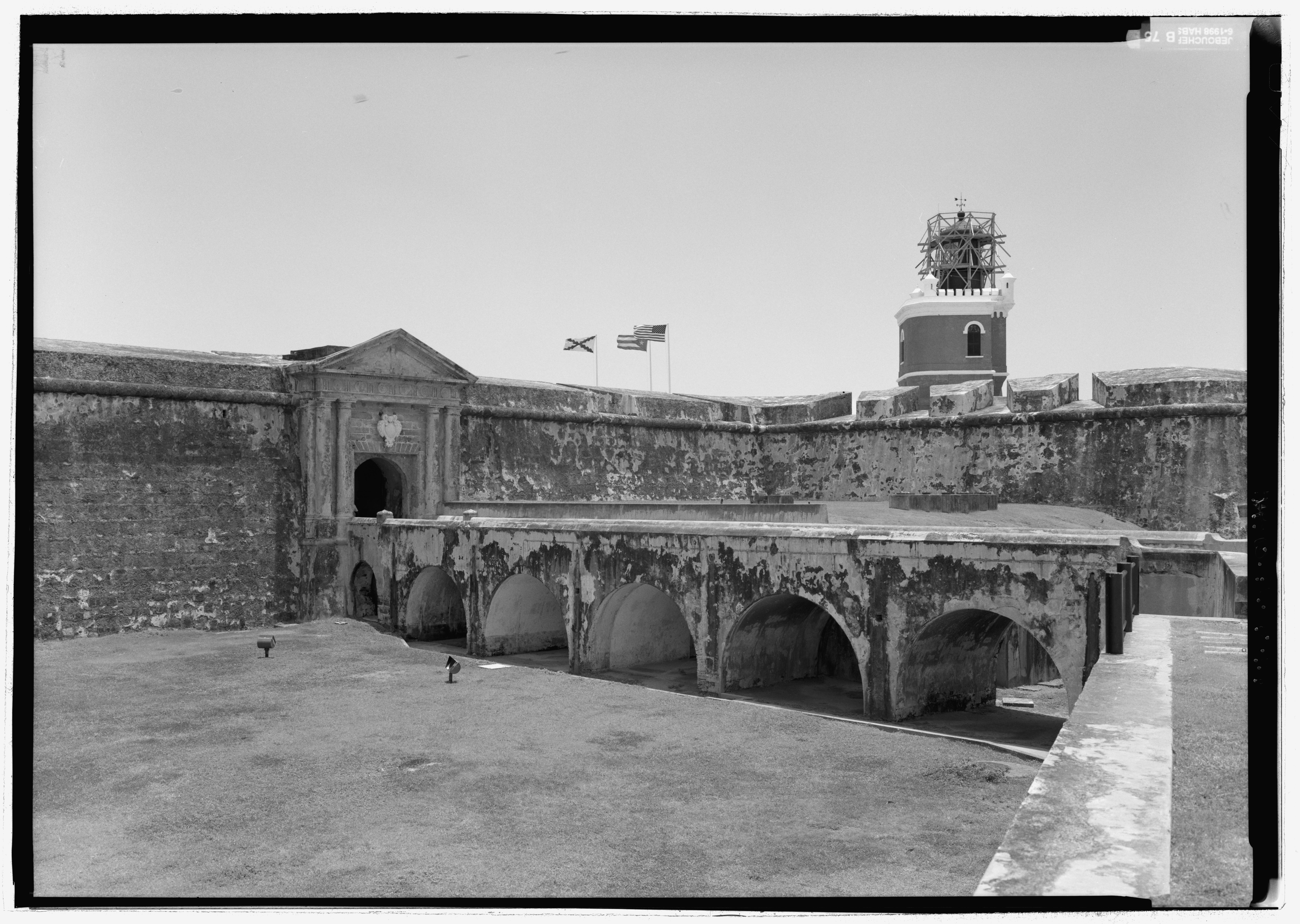
Main gate and the lighthouse in 1998. (Library of Congress Prints and Photographs Division Washington).

El Morro and many other Spanish government buildings in Old San Juan became part of a large U.S. Army post, called Fort Brooke. In the early 20th century, the U.S. military filled up the esplanade (the green space in front of "El Morro") with baseball diamonds, hospitals, officers' quarters, an officers' club and even a golf course.

On March 21, 1915, Lt. Teófilo Marxuach was the officer of the day at the El Morro fortress. The Hamburg America Line cargo liner Odenwald tried to leave port without permission from the Customs Collector. Lt. Marxuach gave the order to open fire on her, which forced her to stop. The shots ordered by Lt. Marxuach are widely regarded to be the first shots fired by the United States in World War I, although the first actual wartime shot fired by the US came on the day war was declared, during the scuttling of SMS Cormoran off Guam.

During World War II the United States Army added a massive concrete bunker to the top of El Morro to serve as a Harbor Defense Fire Control Station to direct a network of coastal artillery sites, and to keep watch for German submarines which were ravaging shipping in the Caribbean. A lighthouse, rebuilt by the U.S. Army in 1906–08 is the tallest point on El Morro, standing 55 metres (180 ft) above sea level. Flagpoles on El Morro today customarily fly the United States flag, the Puerto Rican flag and the Cross of Burgundy flag, also known in Spanish as las Aspas de Borgoña, a standard which was widely used by Spanish armies around the world from 1506 to 1785.

=== National Park (1961–present) ===
In 1961, the United States Army officially retired from El Morro. The fort became a part of the National Park Service to be preserved as museums. In 1983, the Castillo and the city walls were declared a World Heritage Site by the United Nations. In honor of the Quincentennial of the voyages of Columbus in 1992 the exterior esplanade was cleared of palm trees that had been planted by the U.S. Army in the Fort Brooke era, and restored to the open appearance this "field-of-fire" for El Morro's cannon would have had in colonial Spanish times. Parking lots and paved roads were also removed, and the El Morro lighthouse repaired and restored to its original appearance. The 1963 film Thunder Island featured an extensive foot chase and shootout scene filmed at El Morro. El Morro was also used as a film set in the 1996 motion picture Amistad. Steven Spielberg used it to represent a fort in Sierra Leone where African slaves were auctioned in 1839. African slave labor was used in addition to local labor to help build the castillo. El Morro was a defensive military fortification and a major component of San Juan's harbor defense system. Puerto Rico as such was considered by the Spanish crown as the "Key to the Antilles"; no enemy ship could navigate its waters without fear of capture.

An annual artisans festival is held at the fort every July.

The fort is home to a resident colony of around 200 stray cats that are believed to have been descended from cats introduced either during colonial times or in the mid-20th century as part of rat eradication programs. Following concerns over an increase in their population, in 2023 the National Park Service announced it would contract an animal welfare organization to remove the cats and threatened to hire a pest control agency if it were to fail. However, the plan was suspended following a lawsuit by animal welfare groups in 2024.

== Historical timeline ==
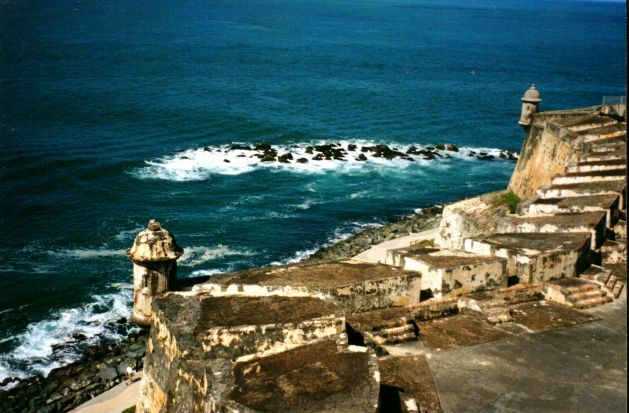
One of many iconic garitas

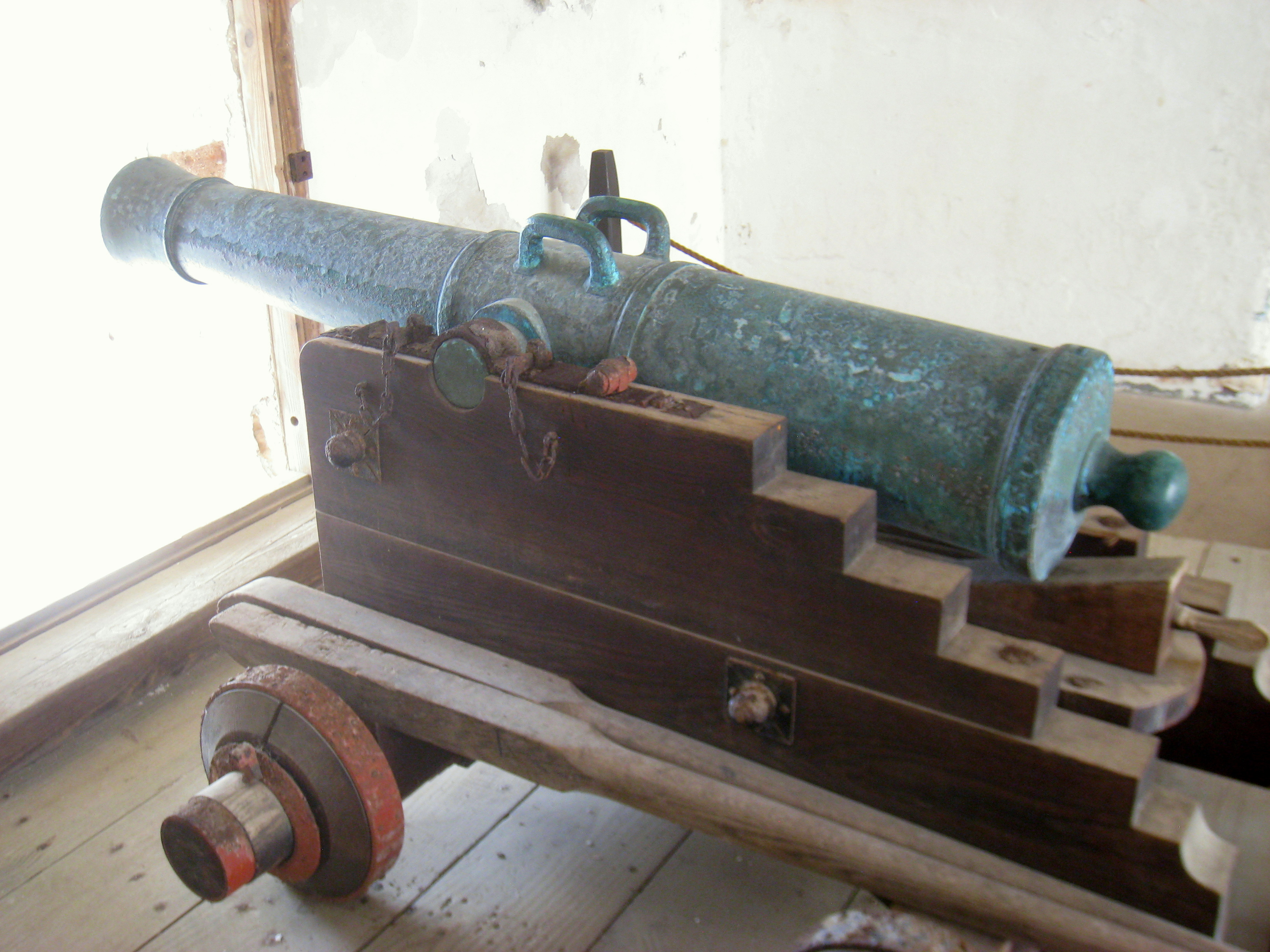
Cannon at Castillo San Felipe del Morro

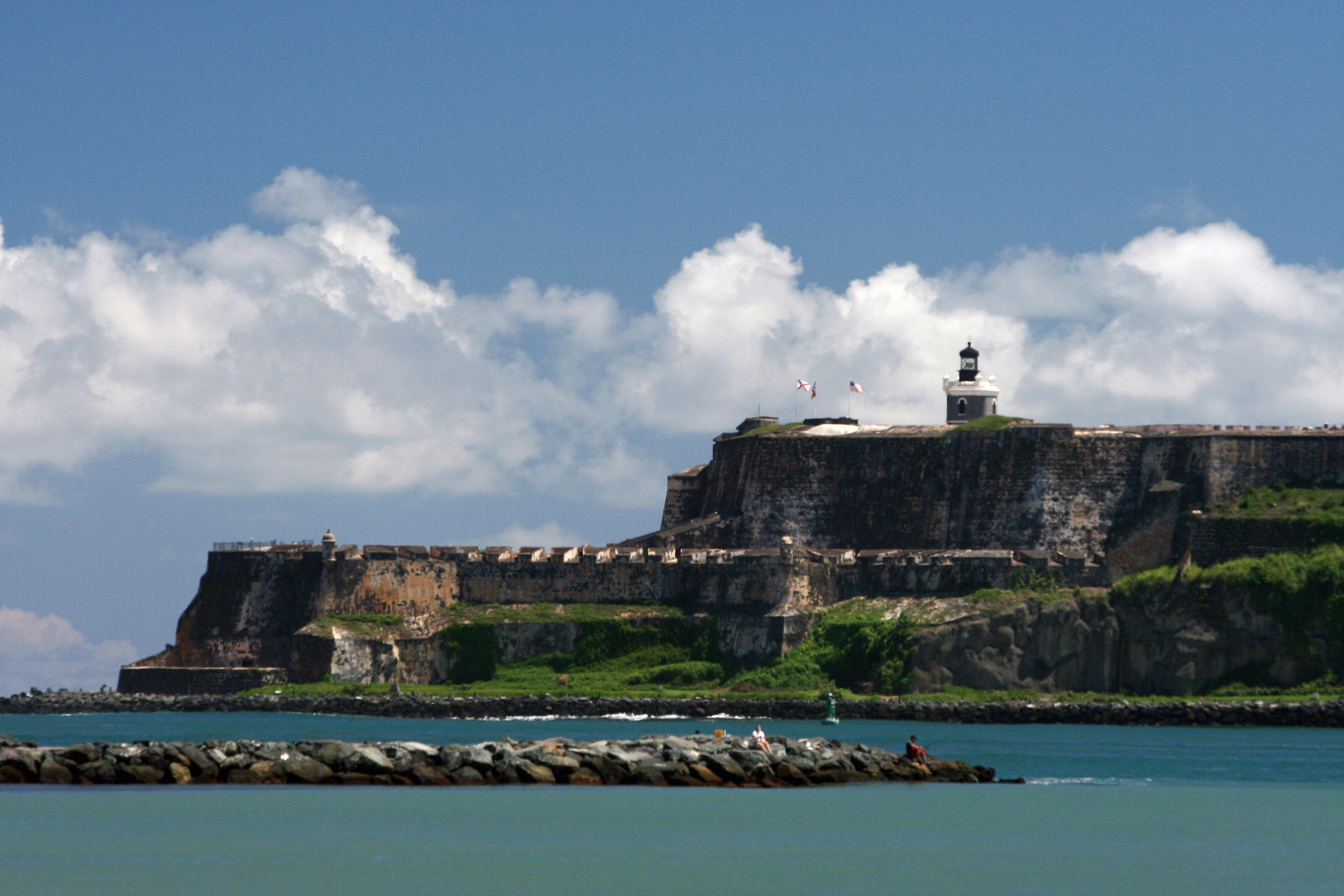
View of Castillo San Felipe del Morro from El Cañuelo

- 1508 – Spanish colonized the area
- 1509 – Spanish settlers from Caparra found San Juan.
- 1539 – Construction of the first harbor defenses at El Morro and La Fortaleza authorized by King Charles V.
- 1587 – Engineers Juan de Tejada and Bautista Antonelli lay out the main design for El Morro still seen today.
- 1589 – Governor Diego Menéndez de Valdés begins new construction at El Morro.
- 1595 – Sir Francis Drake attacks El Morro unsuccessfully by sea. Gunners from El Morro shoot a cannonball through the cabin of Drake's flagship. To impede Drake's ships from entering the bay, a metal chain was drawn across the entrance. Drake was defeated and many of his ships sunk.
- 1598 – George Clifford, Duke of Cumberland, attacks from the land side in June of this year, the only time El Morro was taken in battle. English forces move into the fortress, however weakened by dysentery they leave in November.
- 1625 – The Dutch under the command of Captain Balduino Enrico (also known as Boudewijn Hendricksz/Bowdoin Henrick) attacked and invaded San Juan from the "La Puntilla". El Morro held out under the leadership of Spanish Governor De Haro and Captain Juan de Amézqueta of the Puerto Rican militia, but the city was sacked and burned.
- 1630 – Governor Enrique Enríquez de Sotomayor begins construction of the city walls. Work continues until 1678 to encircle the city completely.
- 1765 – After the siege of Havana in 1762 by the British, King Charles III appoints Field Marshal Alejandro O'Reilly (Alexander O'Reilly) and Royal Engineer Tomás O'Daly (Thomas O'Daly) to reform San Juan's fortifications and reorganize the garrison to make the city a "Defense of the First Order".
- 1787 – An earthquake damages the structure of both San Felipe del Morro and San Cristóbal.
- 1797 – General Ralph Abercromby and Admiral Henry Harvey, with a force of 7,000–13,000 men, invaded the island of Puerto Rico. Captain General Don Ramón de Castro and his forces repelled the attack. Abercromby and Harvey were defeated. This was to be one of the largest invasions to Spanish territories in the Americas.
- 1825 – Well known Puerto Rican pirate, Roberto Cofresí was jailed and later executed within the fort's walls.
- 1843 – First lighthouse in Puerto Rico constructed atop the castle.
- 1898 – On 12 May, US Navy warships shell El Morro in a day-long bombardment, damaging the tip of the main battery. Six months later, Puerto Rico becomes U.S. territory by terms of the Treaty of Paris which ends the Spanish–American War.
- 1899 – The Department of the Navy rebuilds the lighthouse tower as an octagonal reinforced concrete structure using the iron structure as reinforcement. A new lenticular lens is installed. By 1906 a crack, through and around the top of the tower, directly under the lantern requires its demolition.
- 1908 – Present lighthouse seen atop El Morro built by the United States Navy.
- 1915 – First shots of World War I fired by Lt. Teófilo Marxuach on behalf of the United States. Marxuach, a native of Arroyo, Puerto Rico, fired what is considered to be the first shot of World War I fired by the regular armed forces of the United States against any ship flying the colors of the Central Powers. Marxuach, who was a member of the "Porto Rico Regiment of Infantry" and Officer of the Day, on 25 March 1915, opened fire on the Odenwald, an unarmed German merchant ship, as it was trying leave San Juan bay without permission.
- 1942 – El Morro was still an active military post during World War II. The US Army added concrete artillery observation posts and an underground bunker to El Morro to defend against possible German attacks.
- 1949 – San Juan National Historic Site is established.
- 1961 – The U.S. Army moves out of the forts of Old San Juan, and they become the jurisdiction of the United States National Park Service, to be preserved solely as museums.
- 1971 – Featured in the Mission: Impossible episode "The Field" (season 5th, episode 17th).
- 1983 – San Juan National Historic Site declared a World Heritage Site by the United Nations.

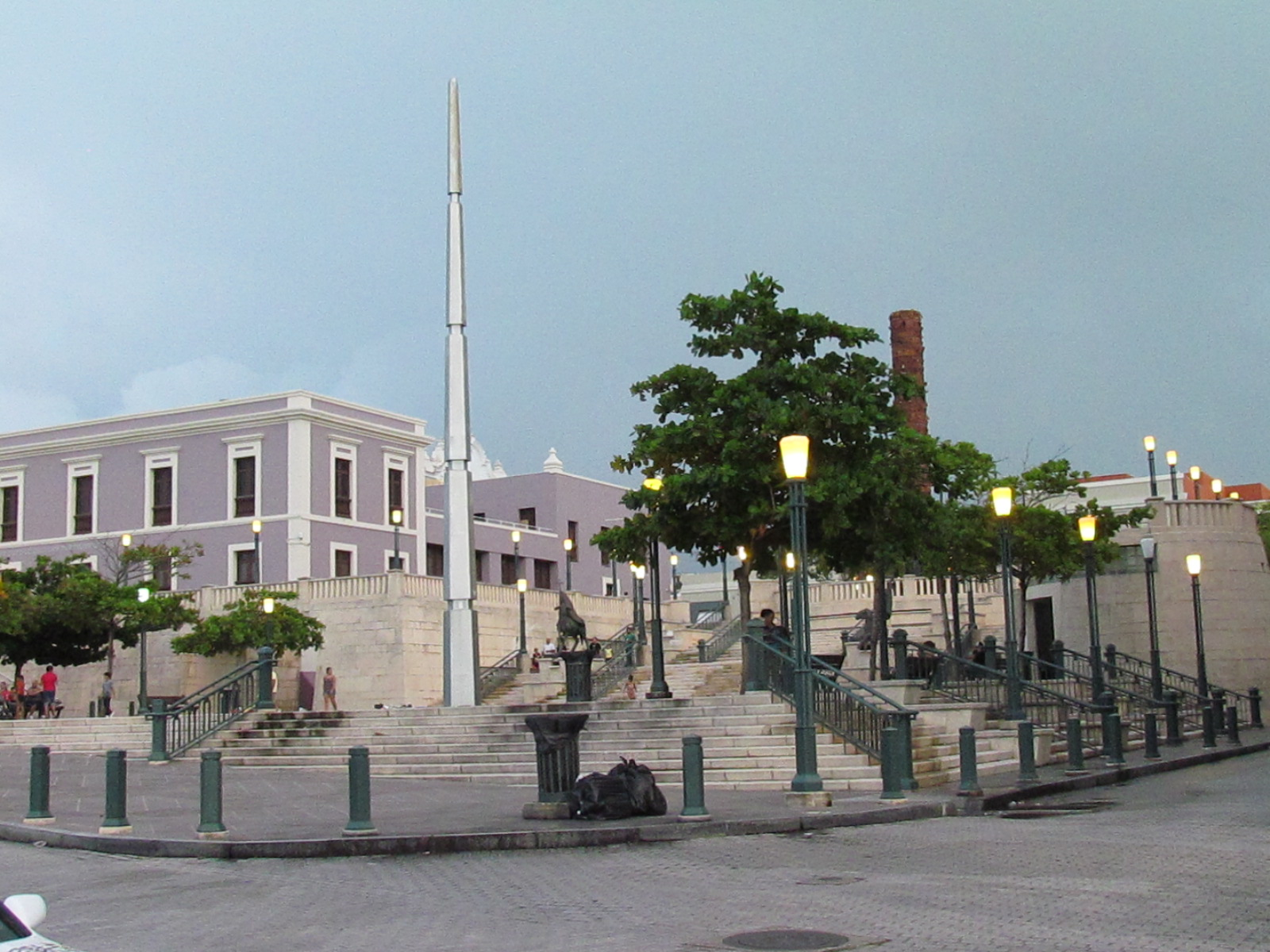
Plaza del Quinto Centenario

- 1992 – El Morro's grounds are returned to their historic 18th-century appearance as part of quincentennial commemoration of the discovery of Puerto Rico by Christopher Columbus when modern roadways and parking lots are removed. El Morro now generates tourism revenue by being open to tours. Also in 1992, Plaza del Quinto Centenario is built across Castillo San Felipe del Morro.
- 2017 – Puerto Rico was struck by Hurricane Maria on September 20, 2017 devastating the infrastructure of the island as well as the tourism industry. Tourism to the Castle of San Felipe or Castillo de San Felipe had recovered by the summer of 2019.

== Gallery ==
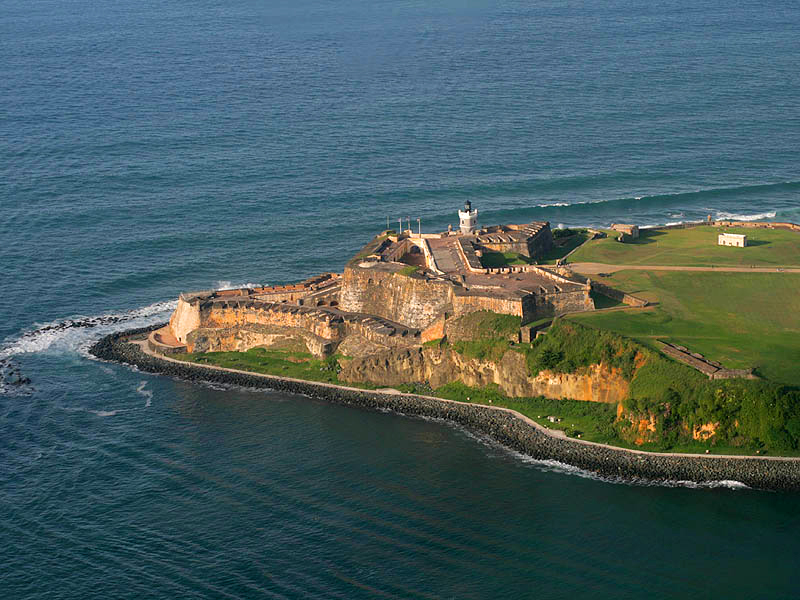
Bird's-eye view of the castle from San Juan Bay

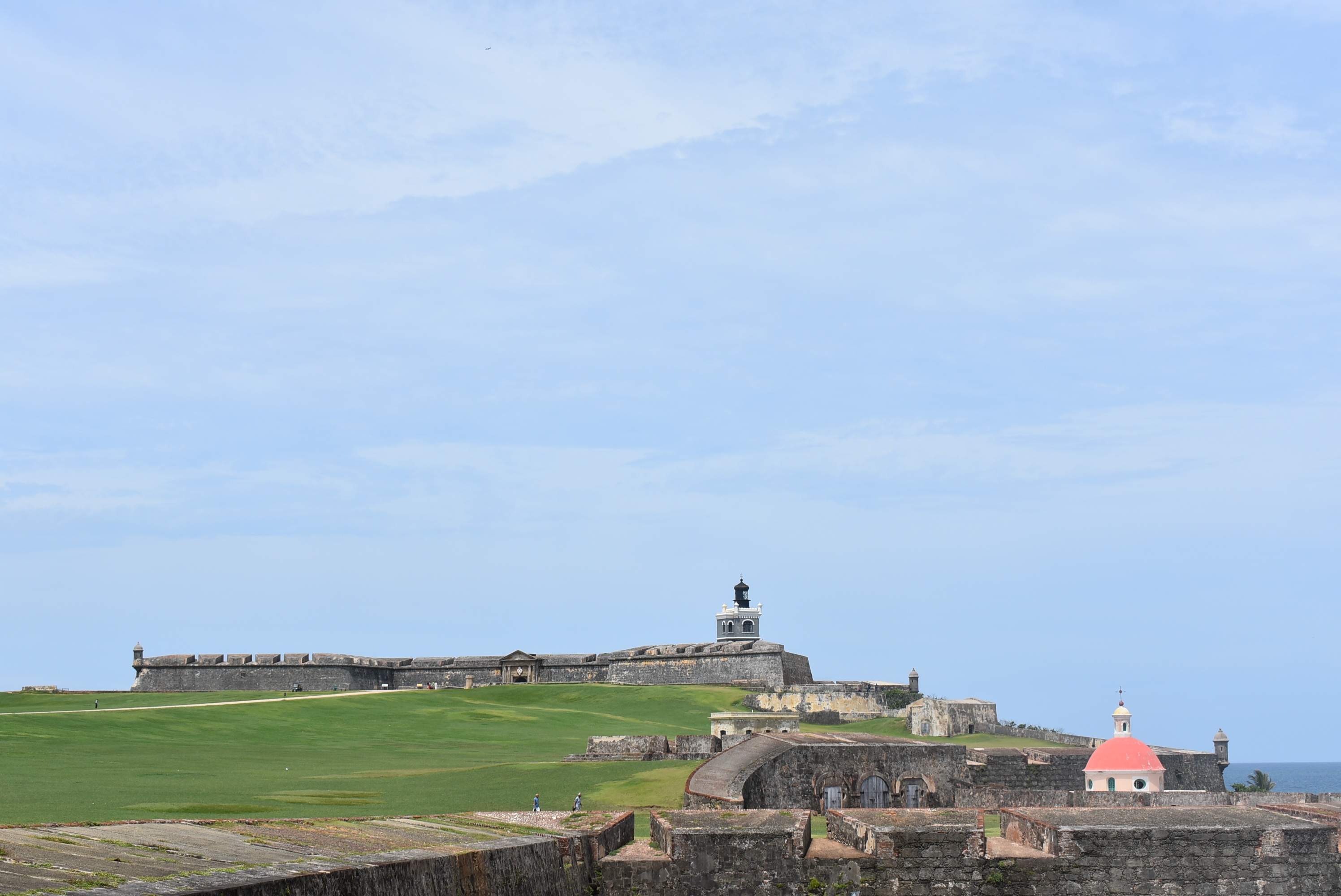
View of the castle from the north

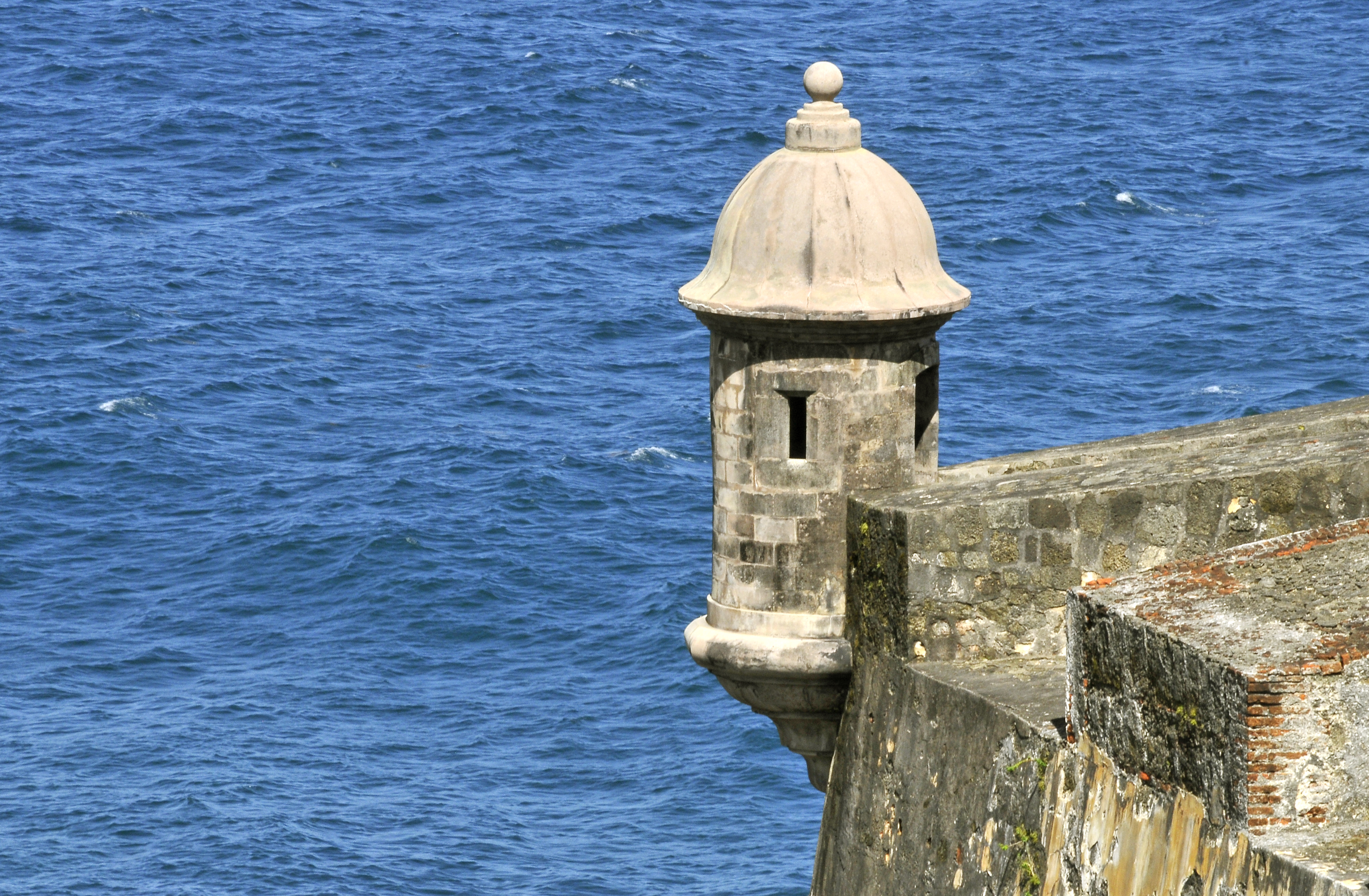
Garita (Sentry Box)

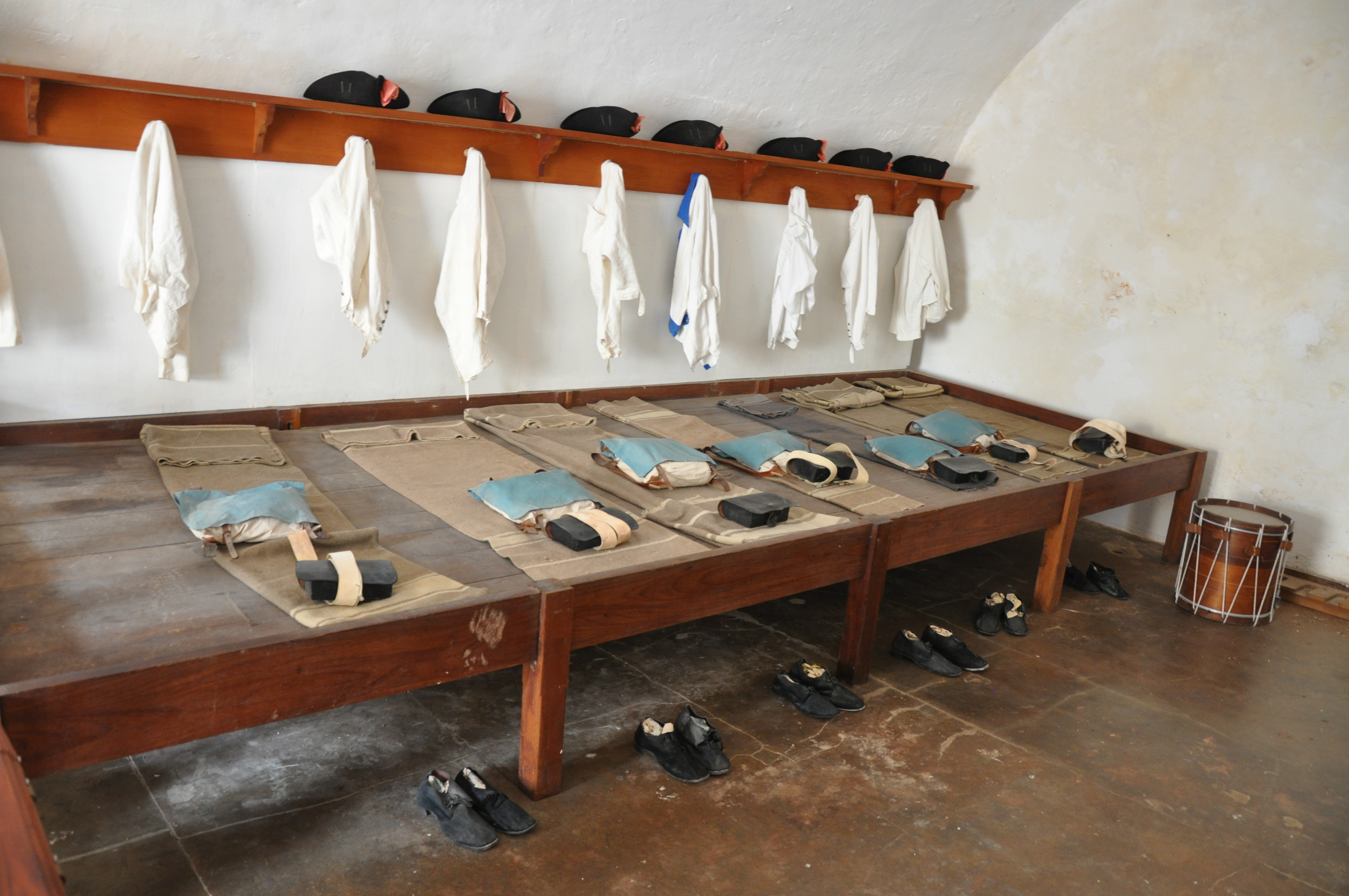
Exhibition inside the castle

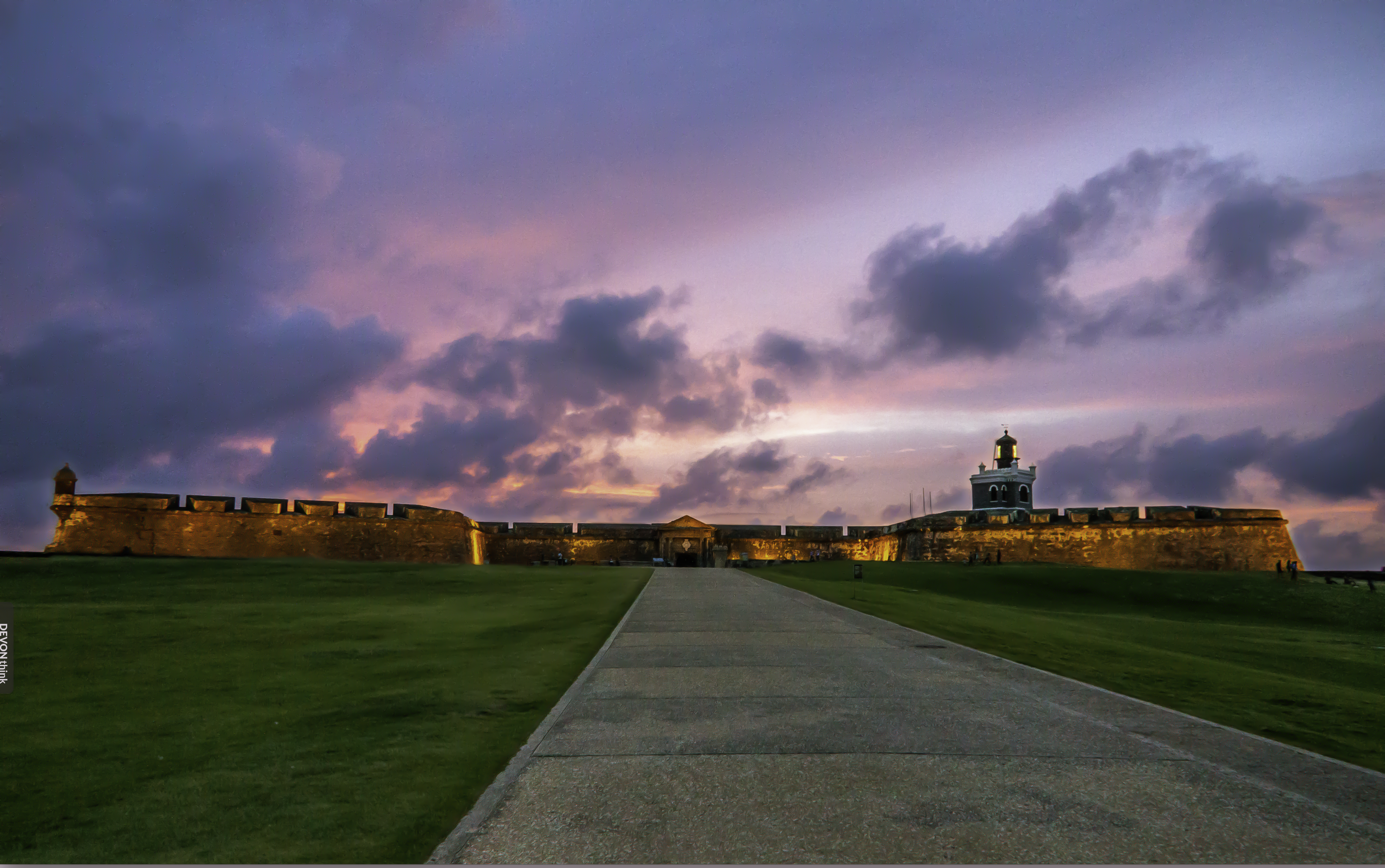
Entrance view of castle at dusk from esplanade

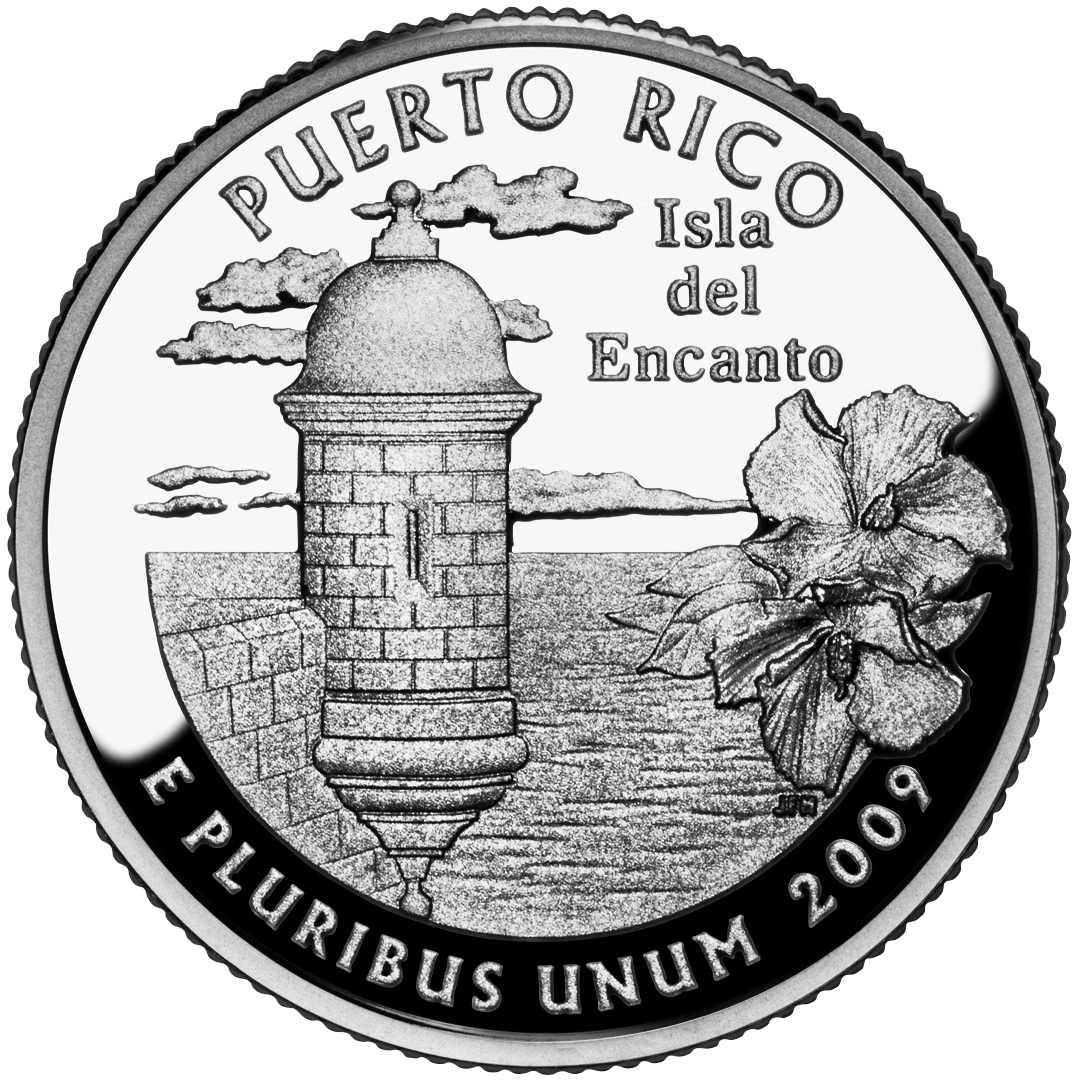
U.S. commemorative quarter, featuring Sentry Box

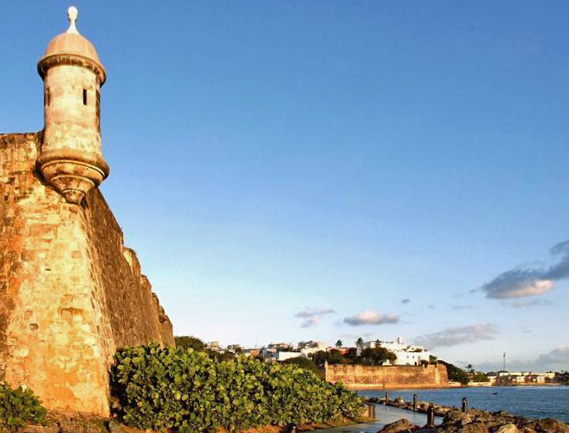
Sentry box La Garita at Castillo San Felipe del Morro

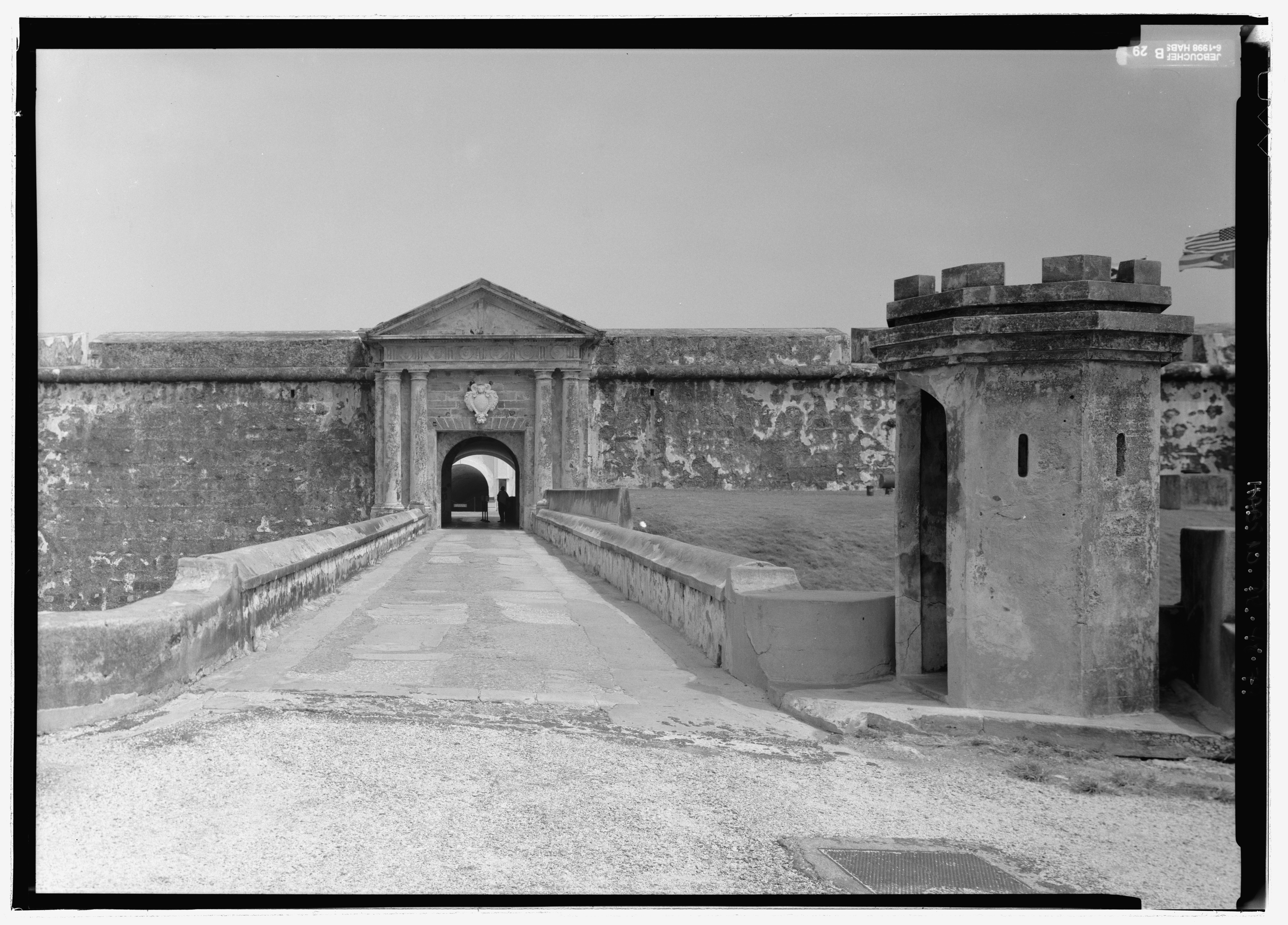
Main gate in 1998.

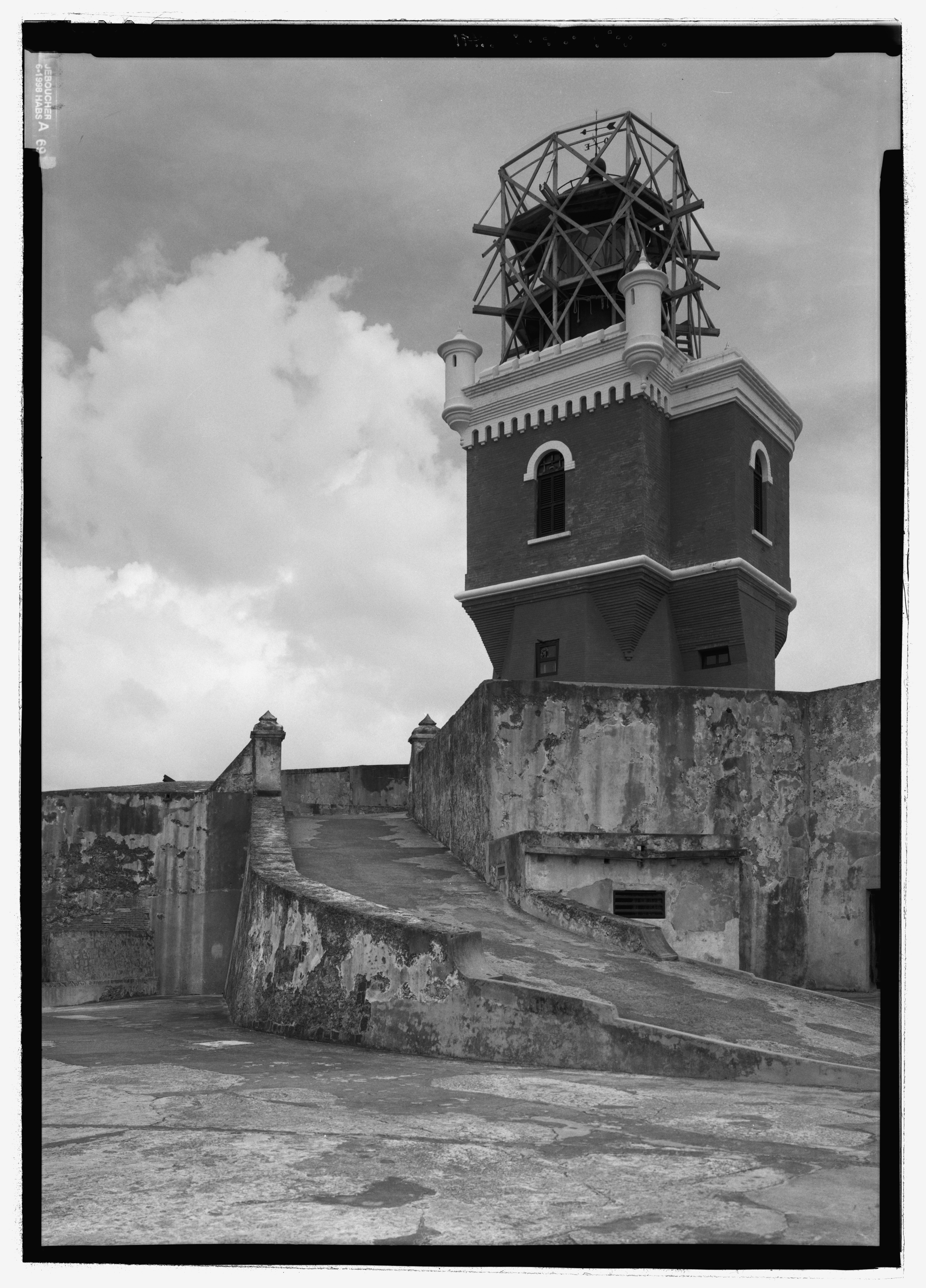
Lighthouse in a photo in 1933.

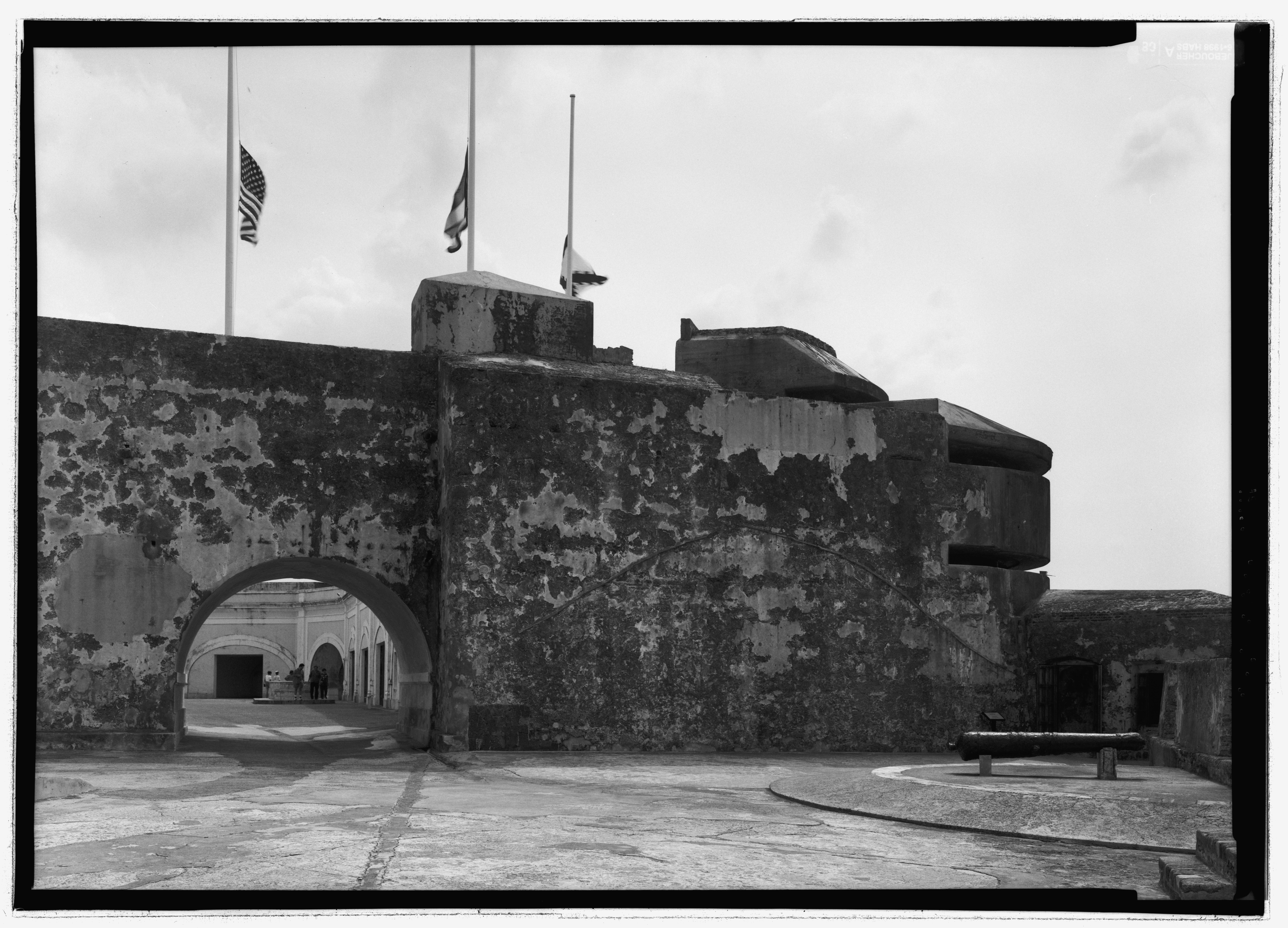
Photo of 1933

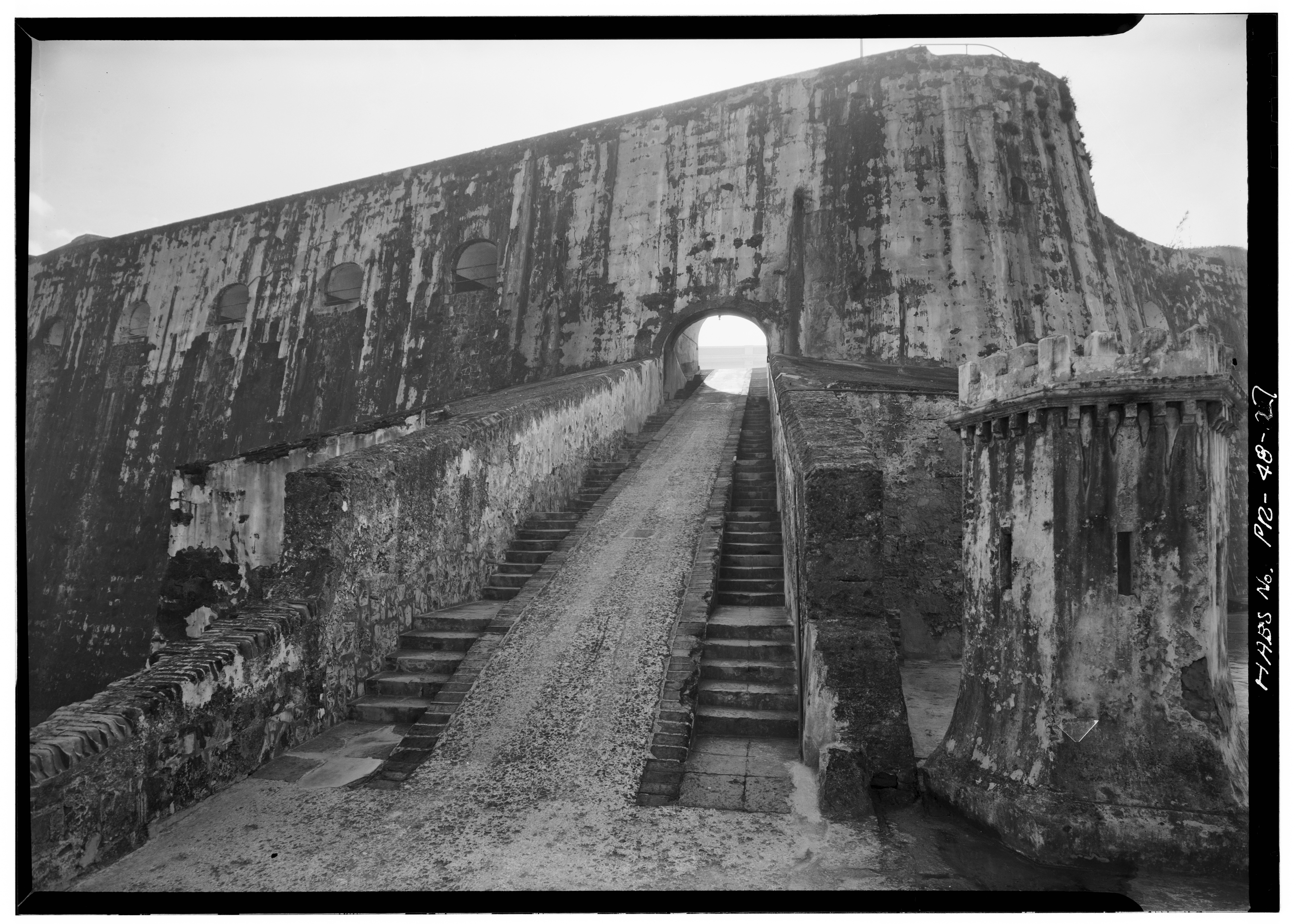
Main ramp from Santa Barbara Bastion in 1933.

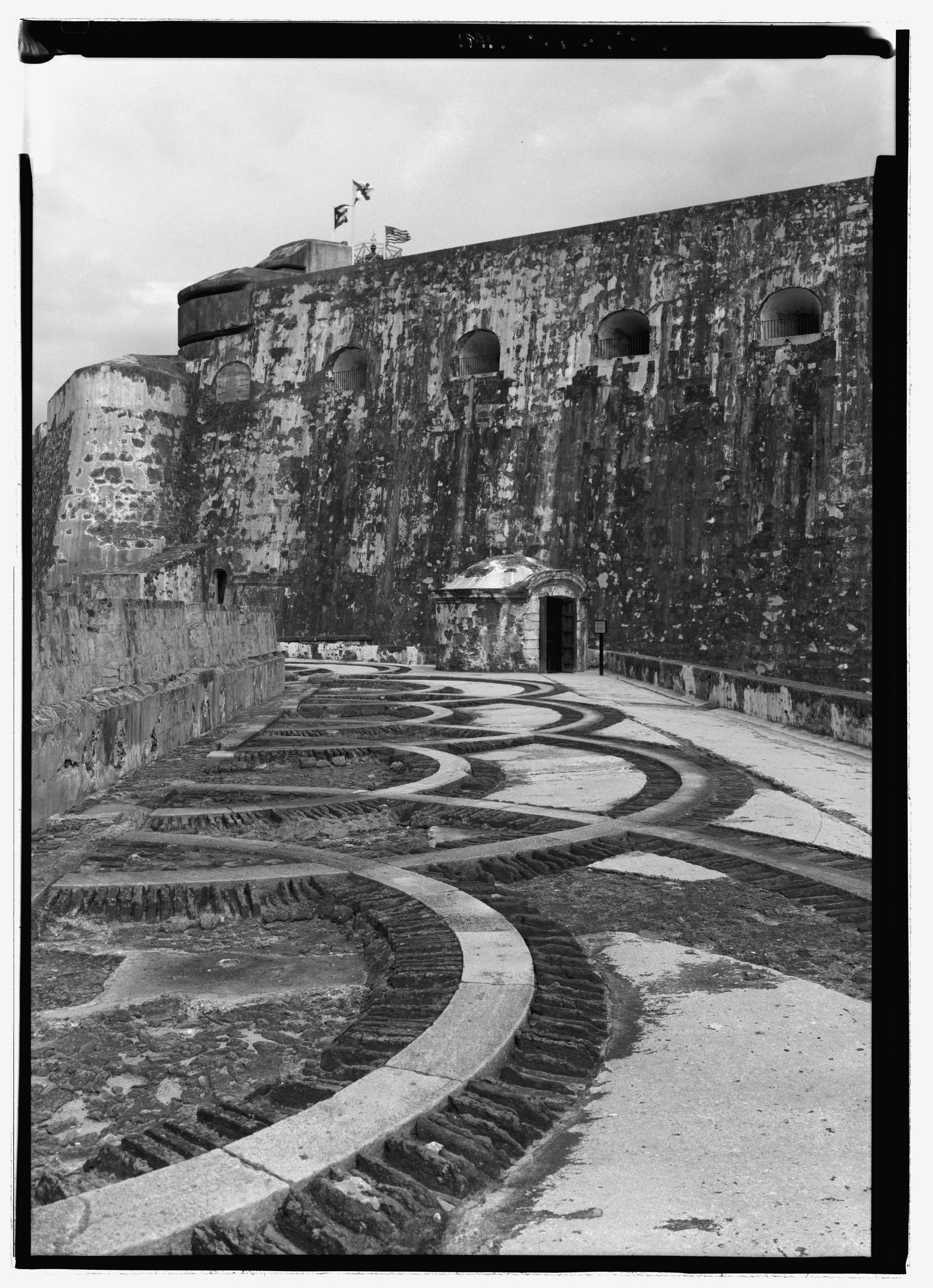
photo of 1933.

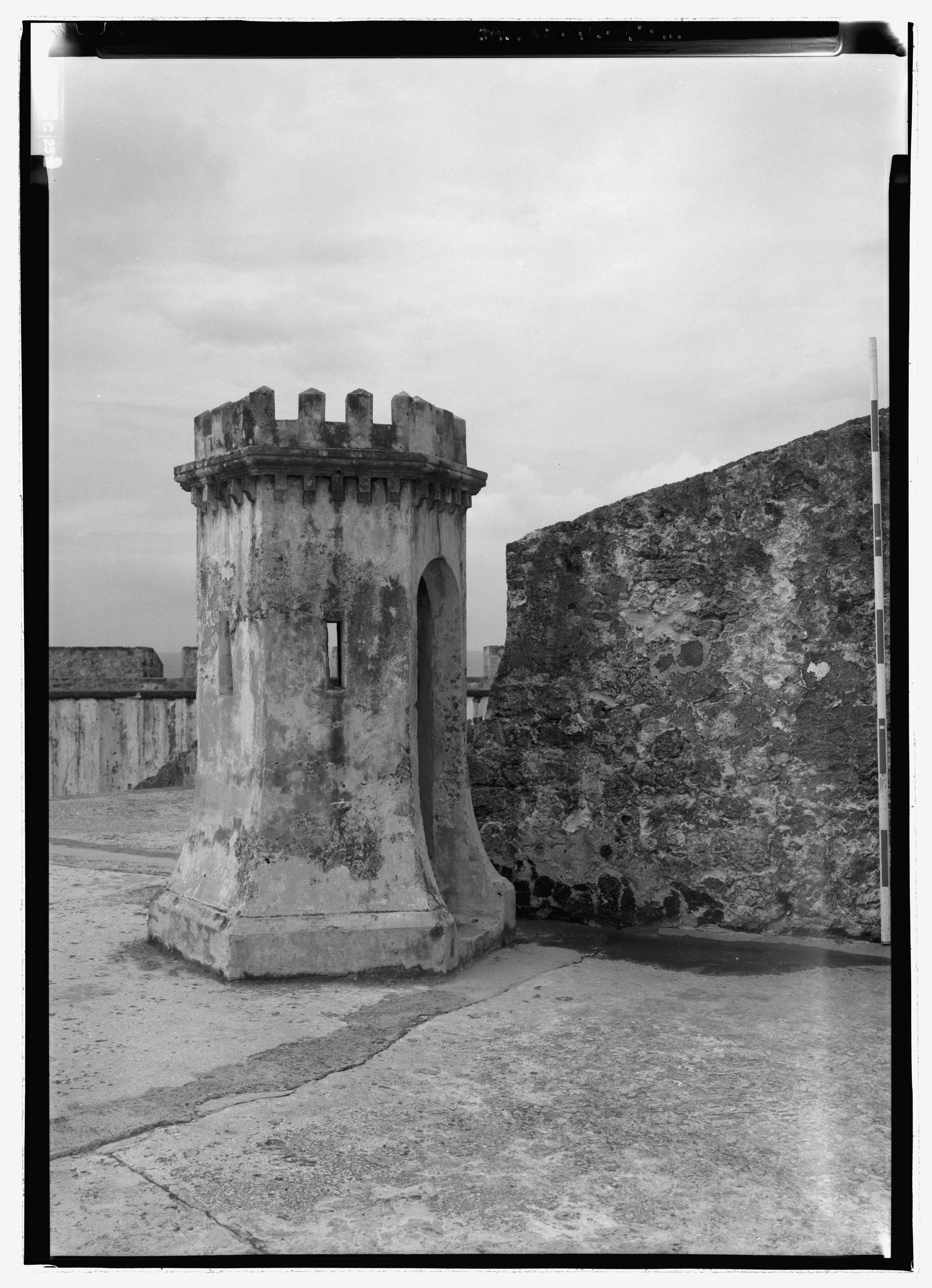
Photo of 1933

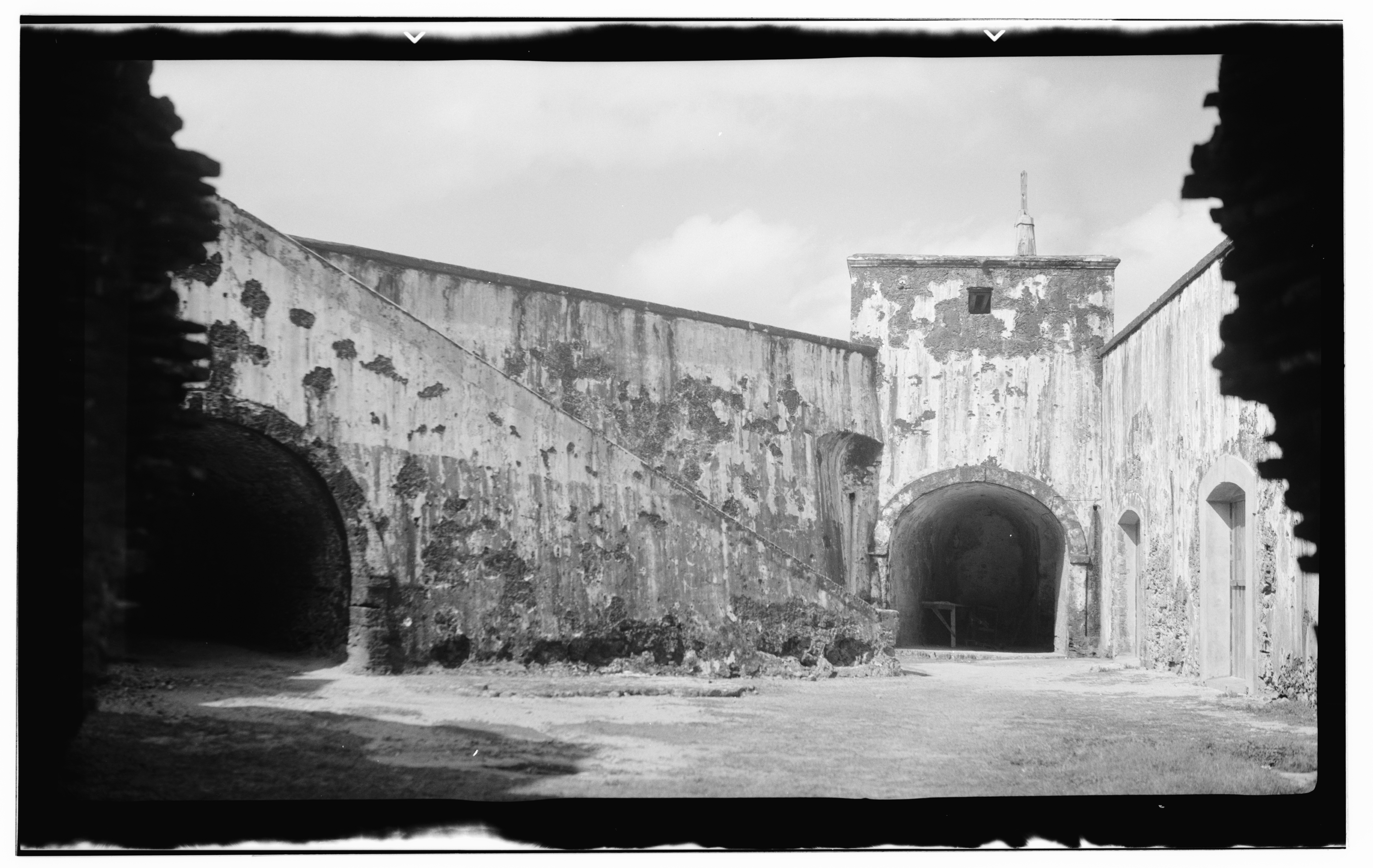
Photo of 1933.

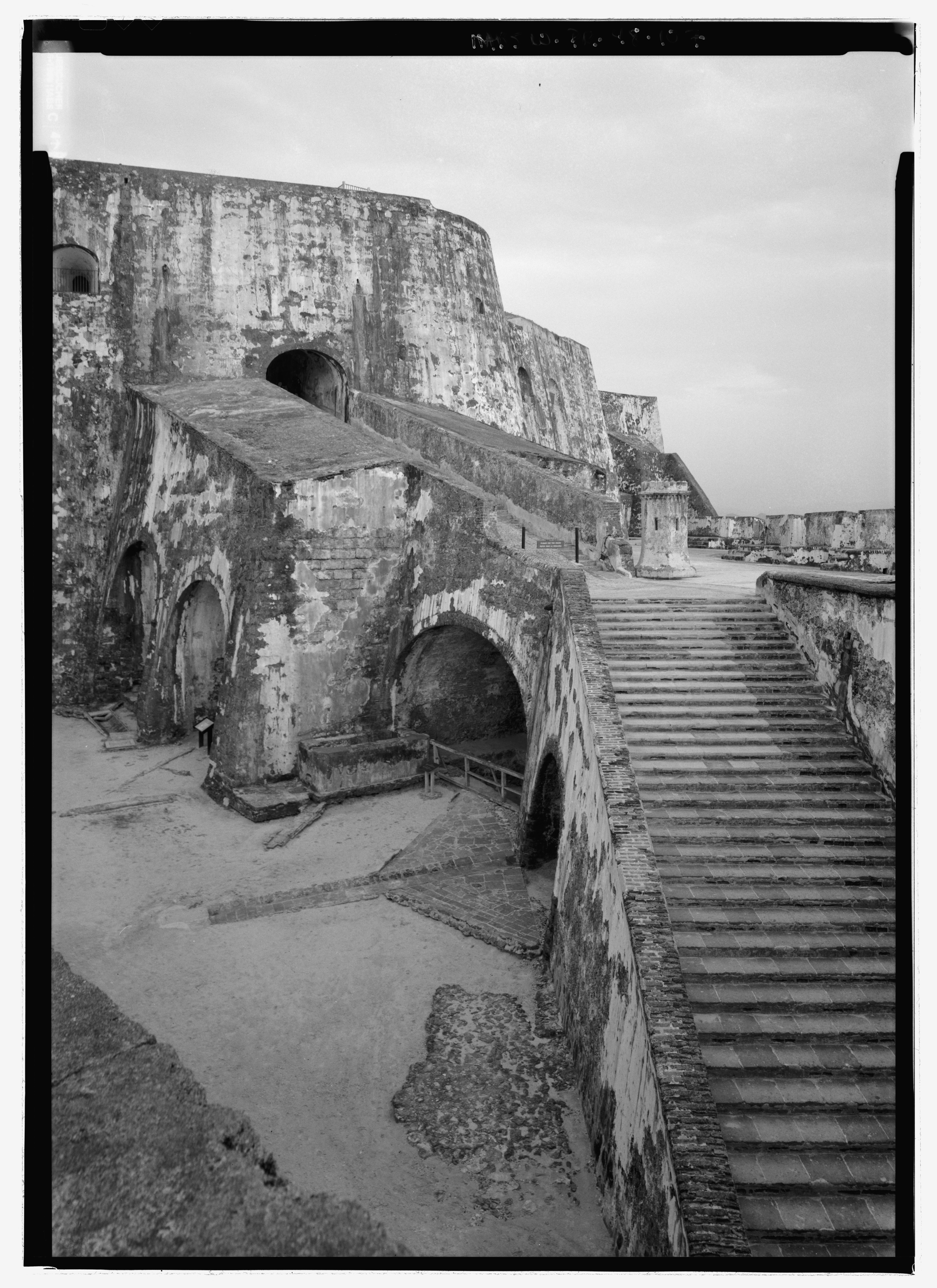
Photo of 1933.

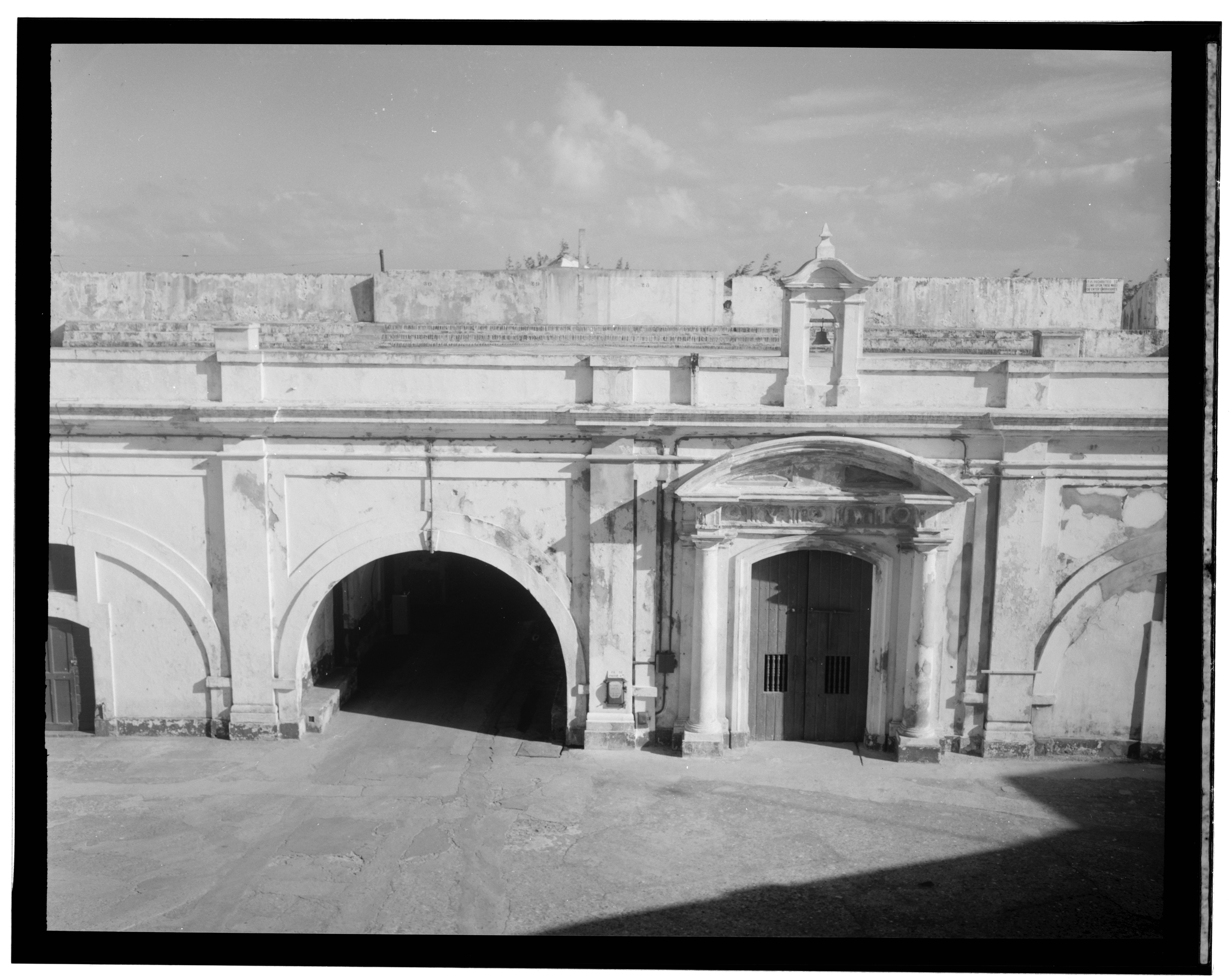
Chapel of the courtyard of the castle in 1933.

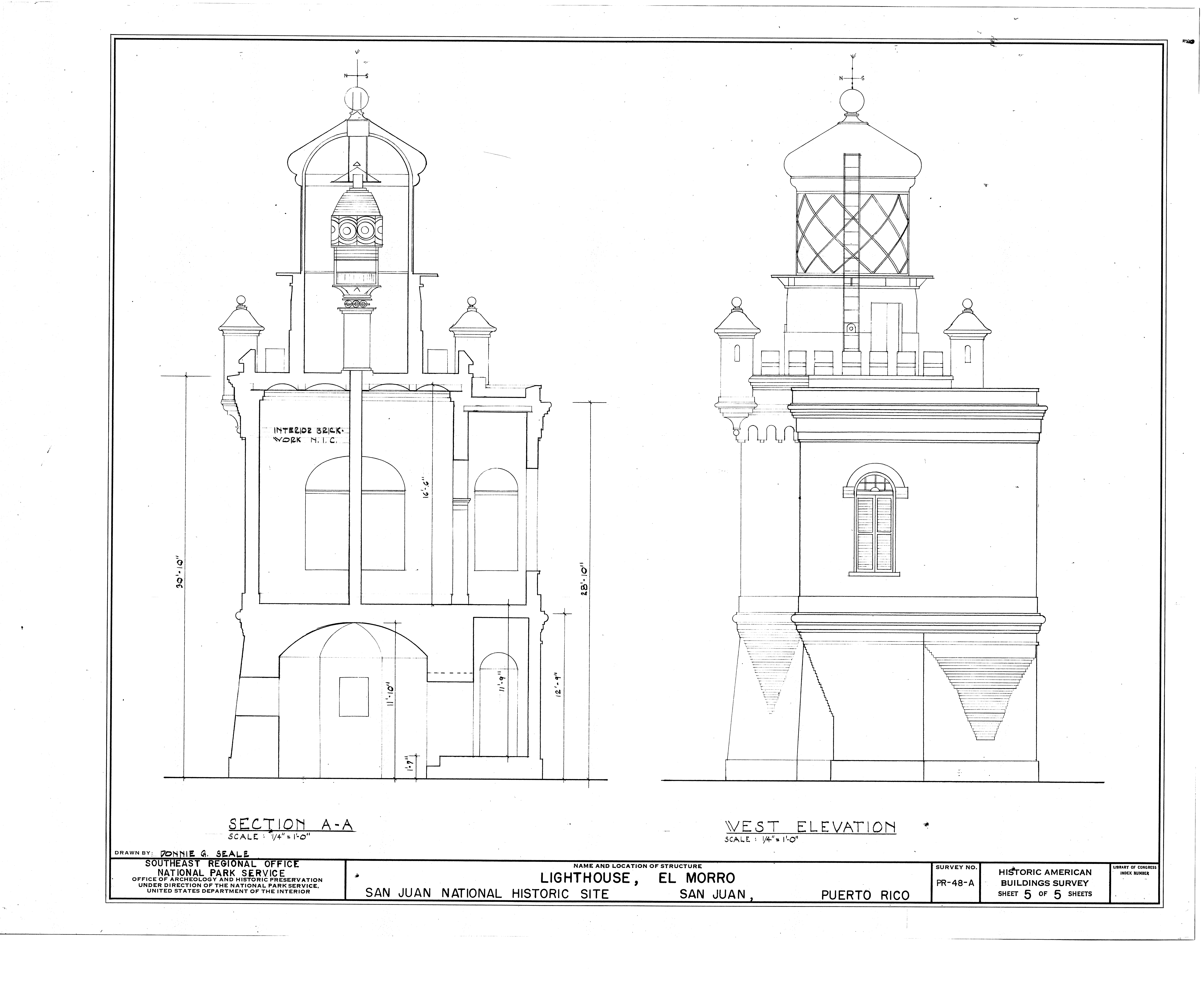
Architectural drawings of the Lighthouse produced in the HABS San Juan, Puerto Rico field office

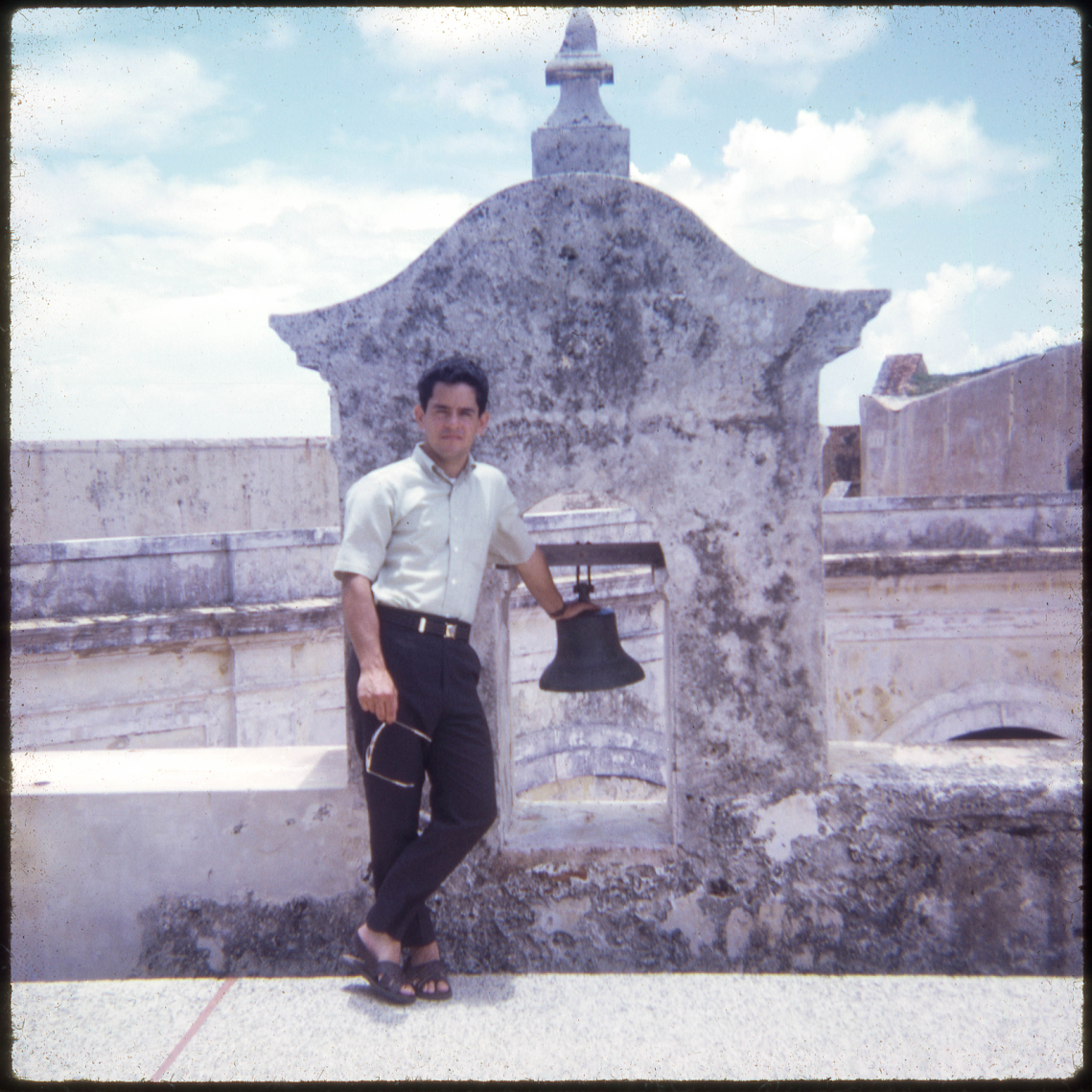
Bell, 1969

== See also ==
Some other forts in San Juan:

- Castillo San Cristóbal
- Fortín de San Gerónimo
- Escambrón Battery

- Ballajá Barracks
- Puerto Rico Campaign
- List of the oldest buildings in Puerto Rico
