= Puerto Rico Ilustrado – Edificio El Mundo =

- Puerto Rico Ilustrado–Edificio El Mundo
- U.S. National Register of Historic Places
- U.S. National Historic Landmark District – Contributing property
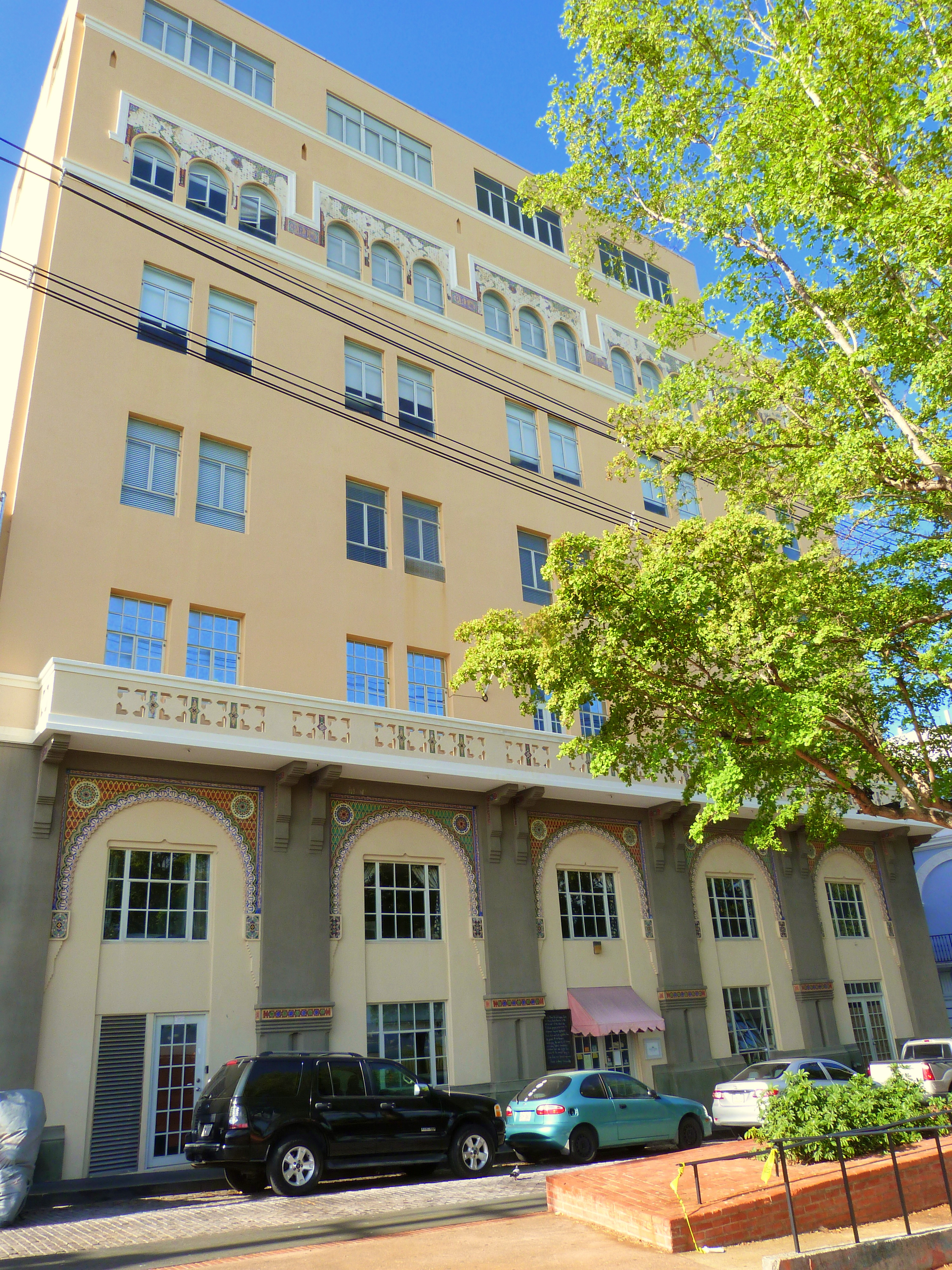
- El Mundo Building in 2017.

- Location within Puerto Rico
- Location: 254 San José Street San Juan, Puerto Rico
- Coordinates: 18°27′51″N 66°07′01″W
- Built: 1923
- Architect: Francisco Roldan
- Architectural style: Art Deco Chicago School Mission/Spanish Revival
- Part of: Old San Juan Historic District
- NRHP reference No.: 97001137
- Added to NRHP: September 25, 1997

Puerto Rico Ilustrado/El Mundo Building (Spanish: Edificio El Mundo/Puerto Rico Ilustrado) is a historic Art Deco high-rise building located in the Old San Juan historic district of the city of San Juan, Puerto Rico. The building was erected in 1923 to serve as the headquarters of the El Mundo newspaper and the Puerto Rico Ilustrado magazine. The architecture of the building blends numerous styles that represent the conjunction of various artistic movements and architectural schools of the late 19th century and the early 20th century. It is located in a high-rise block that faces the elevated La Palma Bastion portion of the city wall of San Juan which, when observed from beyond, makes the building look taller than it is in reality. The building was added to the National Register of Historic Places in 1997 for its architectural and historic importance.

== History ==
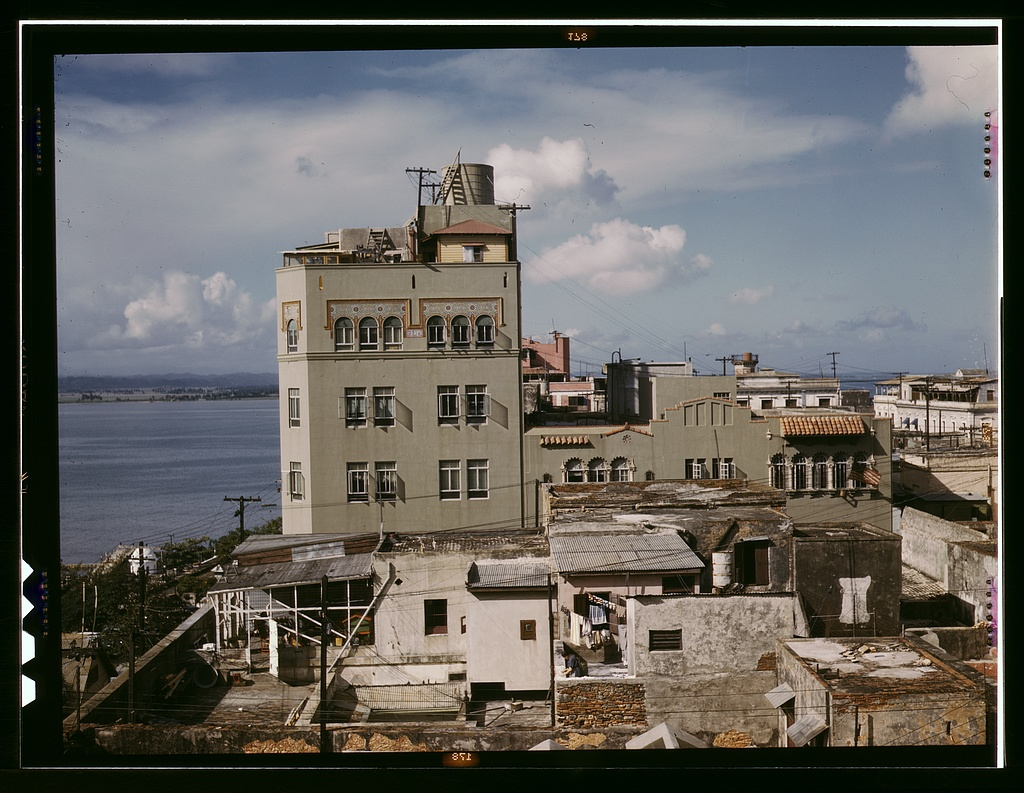
El Mundo Building in 1941.

Historically, the Puerto Rico Ilustrado/El Mundo Building was one of the first high rise buildings to be erected in the island along with several neighbors such as the original headquarters for Banco Popular. The Puerto Rico Ilustrado magazine was first launched in 1910 by Romualdo Real and Manuel Real, a pair of siblings from Tenerife in the Canary Islands who originally worked for various Spanish newspapers such as Heraldo Español. They first moved to Puerto Rico in 1904 where, after acquiring the printing press of El País newspaper, they decided to establish their own publications. Architect Francisco Roldán was commissioned in the early 1920s to design a high rise building that would house both the offices and production machinery for the newly established Puerto Rican magazine and El Mundo, which would become one of the most widely circulated newspapers in the island. This happened during a short but intense boom of high-rise building constructions in Old San Juan. It was built by Frank B. Hatch and his firm, who were also responsible for several civic edifications of the time such as the Brambaugh School in Puerta de Tierra. The building was inaugurated in 1923 and, in addition to the staff offices and machinery, contained communications facilities, archives and photography workshops for both publications. These facilities spearheaded the then modern development of photojournalism in Puerto Rico.

The building served as the headquarters and main printing press for El Mundo until the company, as many others at the time, moved to new facilities at the recently established Hato Rey central business district, the so-called Milla de Oro, in 1966. Puerto Rico Ilustrado ran until 1952, while El Mundo was last published in 1986. The municipal government of San Juan became the new tenants of the building until it was finally sold to private investors in 1979 and, soon after, became abandoned until 1985 when it turned into a multiple office space with private apartments at the top level by Copali, Inc. (today The Copal Group).

== Architecture ==
The Puerto Rico Ilustrado/El Mundo Building represents the embodiment of all the architectural trends of Puerto Rico during the 1920s. As with the other high-rise buildings established at the time in the area, it closely follows the typology of the Chicago school of architecture such as the use of steel-frame buildings with terracotta cladding. While this typology of building in the United States incorporated elements of Neoclassical architecture, El Mundo Building localized by incorporating elements of the Mission and Spanish Revival styles instead. Francisco Roldán also incorporated elements of Art Deco and Moorish design in the ornamentation and geometric window frames.

Structure and ornamentation

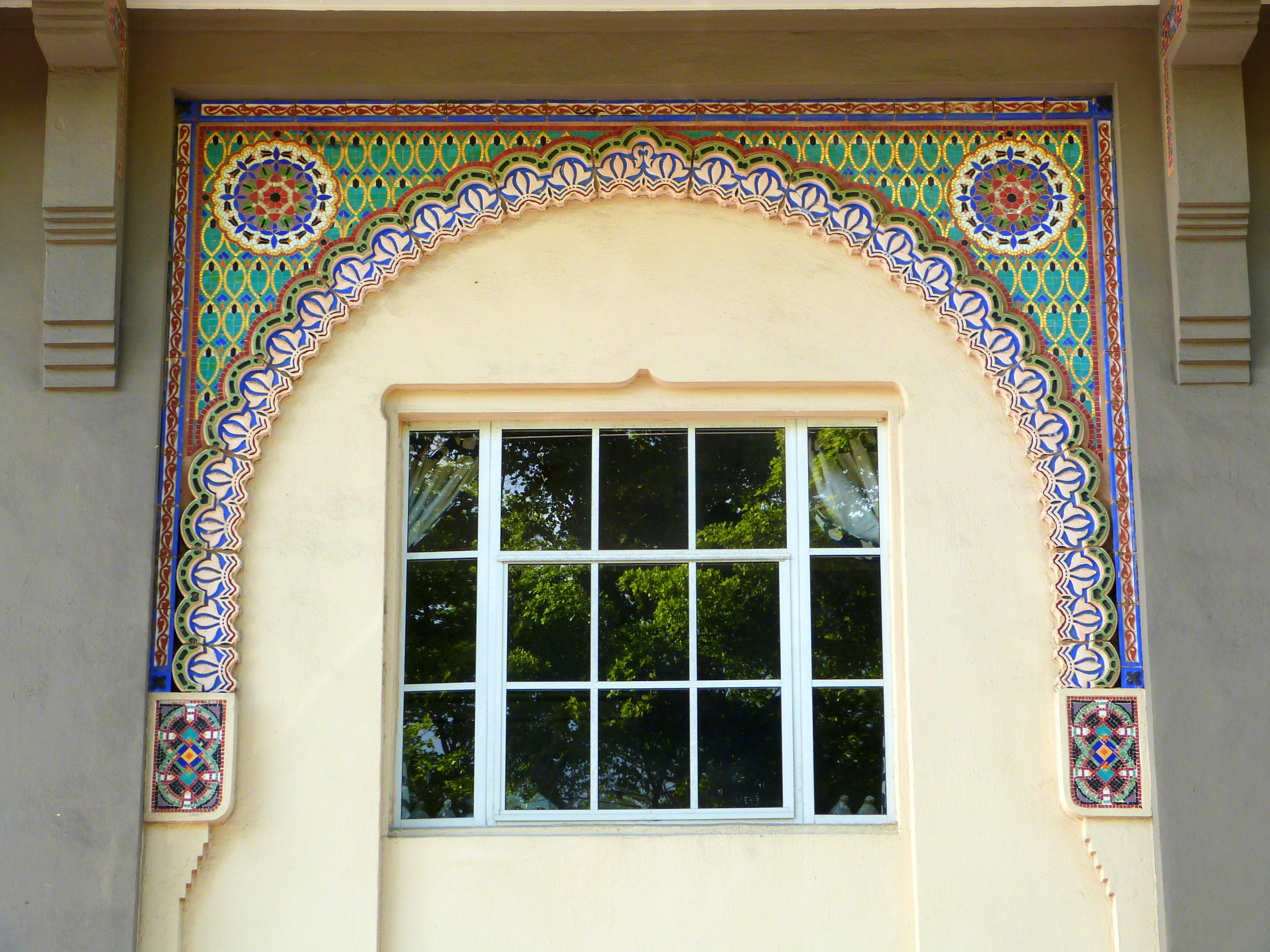

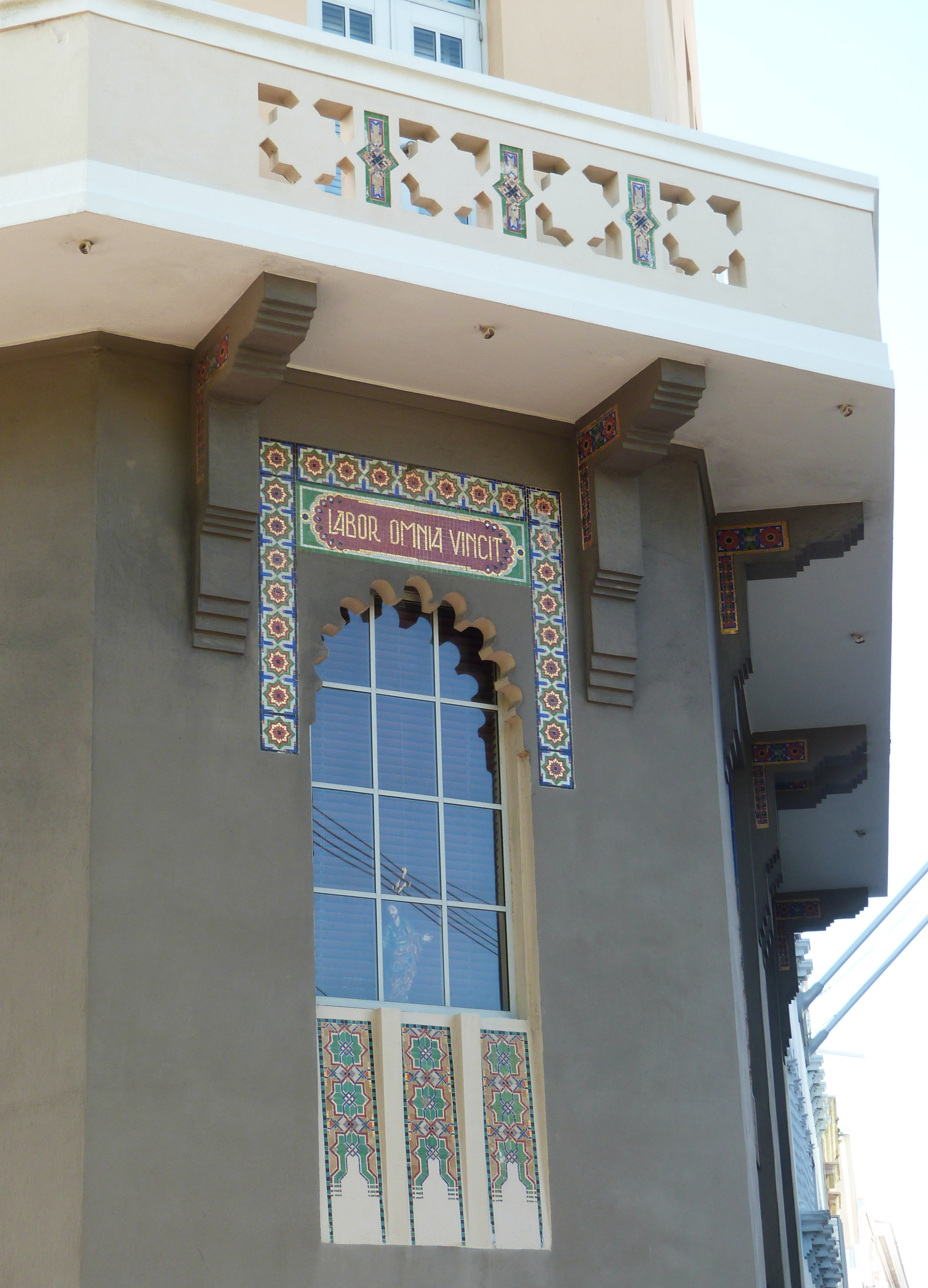

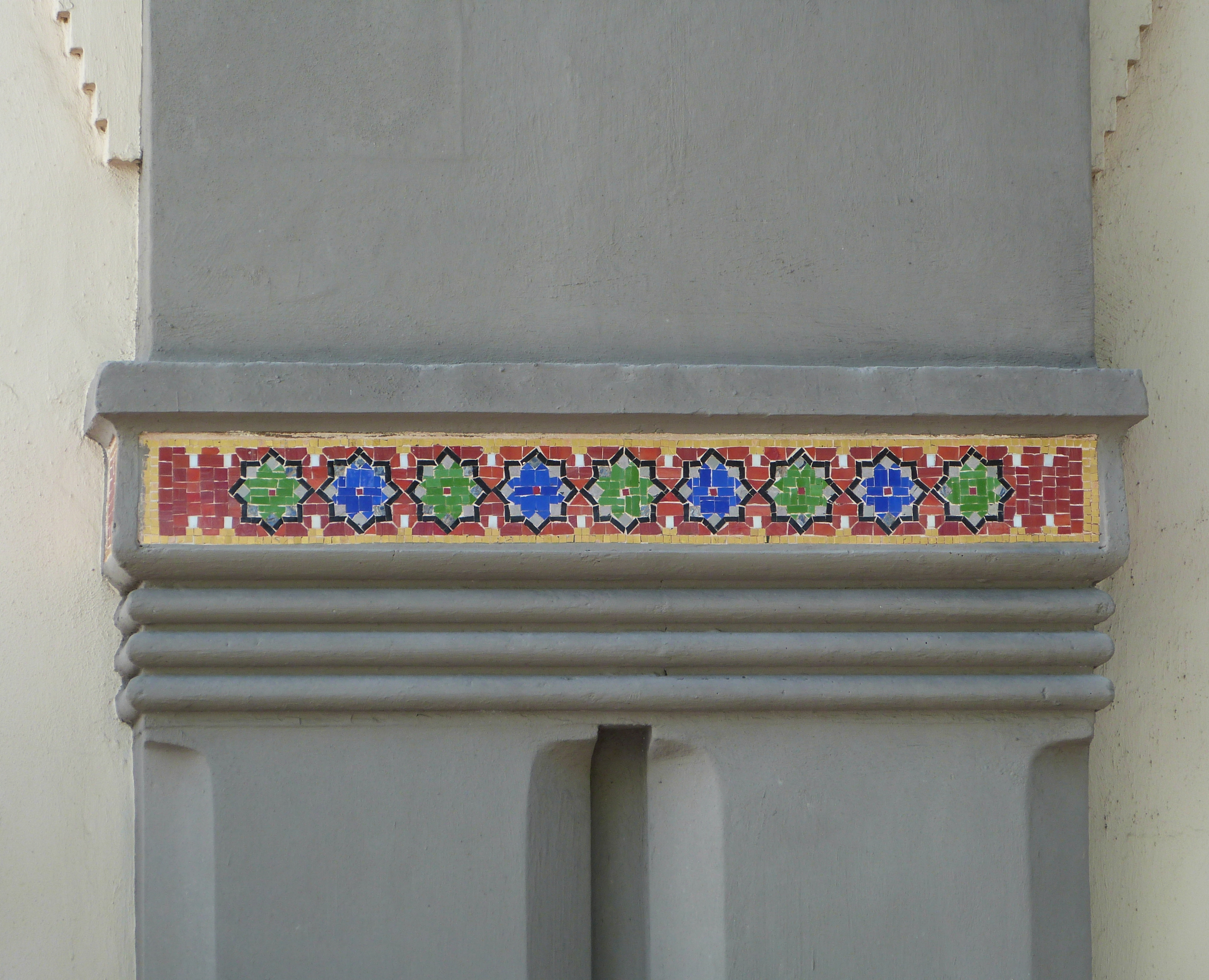

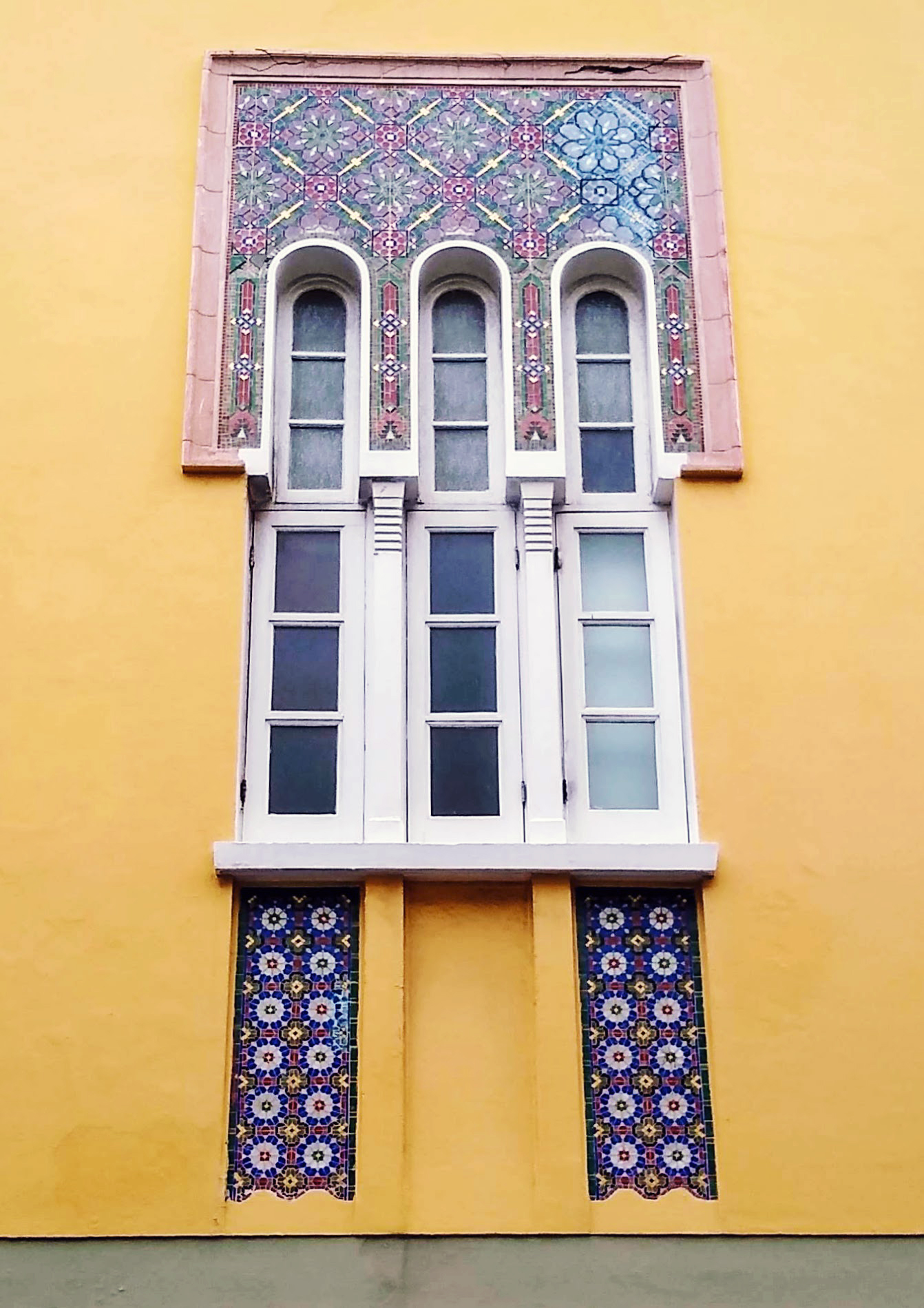

== See also ==
- Architecture of Puerto Rico
- Media of Puerto Rico
