= San Juan Islet =

Small island congruent with San Juan Antiguo barrio of San Juan in Puerto Rico

Native name: Isleta de San Juan
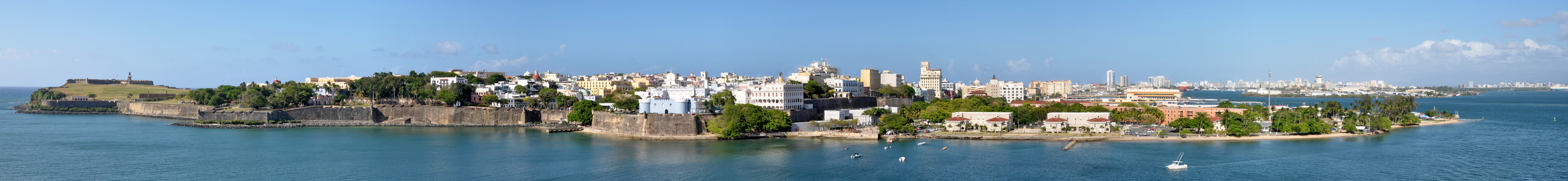
- San Juan Islet from El Morro fortress in the Old San Juan historic quarter, 2012 West end of San Juan Islet with Old San Juan quarter from San Juan Bay, 2011

- Satellite image of San Juan Islet, 2016
- Interactive map of San Juan Islet
- Other name: La Isleta ("The Islet")

Geography
- Location: Caribbean Sea
- Coordinates: 18°28′0.43″N 66°6′26.47″W
- Archipelago: Puerto Rico
- Adjacent to: Isla de Cangrejos (east); Isla de Cabras (west)
- Area: 7.8 km^{2} (3.0 sq mi)
- Length: 2.6 mi (4.2 km)
- Width: 0.15–0.60 mi (0.24–0.97 km)
- Highest elevation: 34 m (112 ft)
- Highest point: Loma de las Ánimas (Las Ánimas Hill)
- Territory: Puerto Rico

Demographics
- Population: 6,383 (2020)

San Juan Islet (Spanish: Isleta de San Juan) is a small, narrow island on the northeastern coast of the main island of Puerto Rico, bordered by the Atlantic Ocean to the north, San Juan Bay to the west and south, and Condado Lagoon to the east. Covering 3 sq mi (7.8 km^{2}) of steeply-sloped terrain along the north and west, and flat, sea-level terrain along the south and east, the islet is organized as the San Juan Antiguo barrio of San Juan, the capital city and municipality. It is generally divided into two districts, namely Puerta de Tierra in the east and Old San Juan in the west, which comprises the original limits of the capital city as established by Spanish Empire during the Age of Discovery and Sail in 1521. It is the site of the oldest permanent European settlement in Puerto Rico, and the second-oldest European-established continuous capital city in the Americas, after Santo Domingo in Hispaniola.

== History ==
San Juan Islet had been inhabited since before the Spanish arrival to the Caribbean in 1492. Remains of a shell shed and a fishing site were uncovered in 1937 (near the modern-day Puerto Rico National Guard Museum) in by archaeologist Irving Rouse from Yale University.

The island was first mapped in 1519 with the intention of surveying possible sites for a future home for the settlers of Caparra. Road connection with the main island of Puerto Rico was not completed until 1519. The town of Puerto Rico de San Juan Bautista was officially founded on July 20, 1521. Construction of La Fortaleza, the Casa de la Contratación and Juan Ponce de León's residence of Casa Blanca began the same year. With the establishment of a port and other militaristic infrastructure, the original colonial settlement of San Juan kept growing in size until the 18th century when the town of El Roble (today Río Piedras) took its place as the largest urban center in the region.

== Geography ==
View of western half of the San Juan Islet from Aguas Buenas

San Juan Islet is a small island measuring 3-square-mile (7.8 km^{2}). It is separated from the main island of Puerto Rico by El Boquerón and the San Antonio Channel (Caño de San Antonio). The island is hilly and rocky. With the exception of its western end and its south coast, the island is partially surrounded by cliffs, and promontories such as El Morro in its northwestern end.

The population center of San Juan Islet can be divided into west and east. Its western part includes the neighborhoods (subbarrios) of Ballajá, Catedral, Mercado, San Cristóbal, San Francisco and Marina that constitute Old San Juan, and its eastern part constitutes the neighborhood of Puerta de Tierra, location of many of Puerto Rico's government buildings such as its capitol building.

== Culture ==
The historic Normandie Hotel and Caribe Hilton Hotel are located in the San Juan Islet.

== Demographics ==
Its population in 2010 was about 7,000.

== Transportation ==
San Juan Islet is connected to the main island of Puerto Rico by three bridges and a causeway. Dos Hermanos Bridge connects it to El Condado, while the San Antonio Bridges connect it with Isla Grande. Although no longer in use, the San Antonio Railroad Bridge is still preserved today. It used to provide railway connection between Old San Juan's Covadonga Terminal and the rest of Puerto Rico.

Traffic into the island is normally closed during the San Sebastián Street Festival.

== Gallery ==
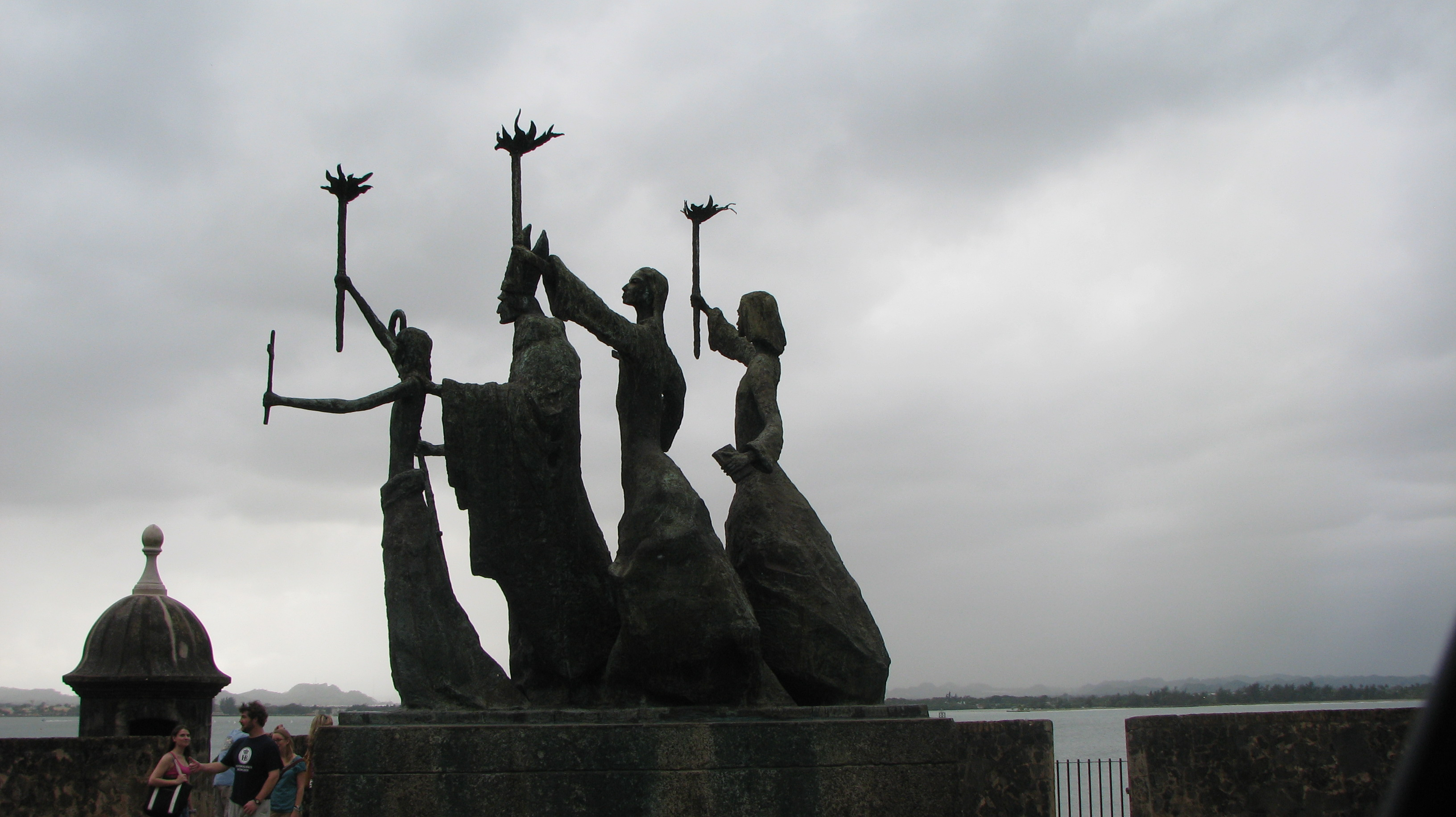
Silhouette of Statues in Isleta de San Juan

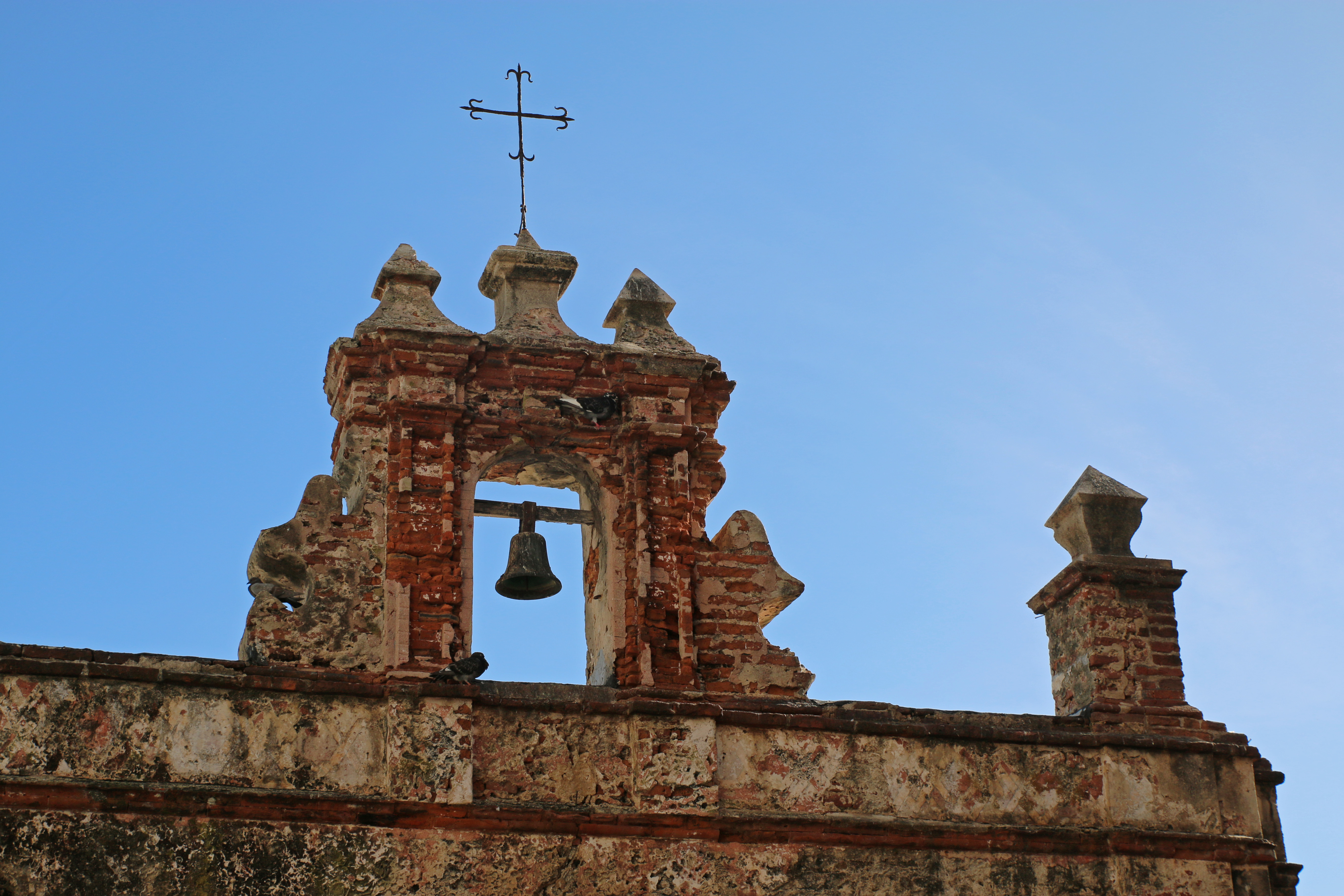
Capilla del Cristo

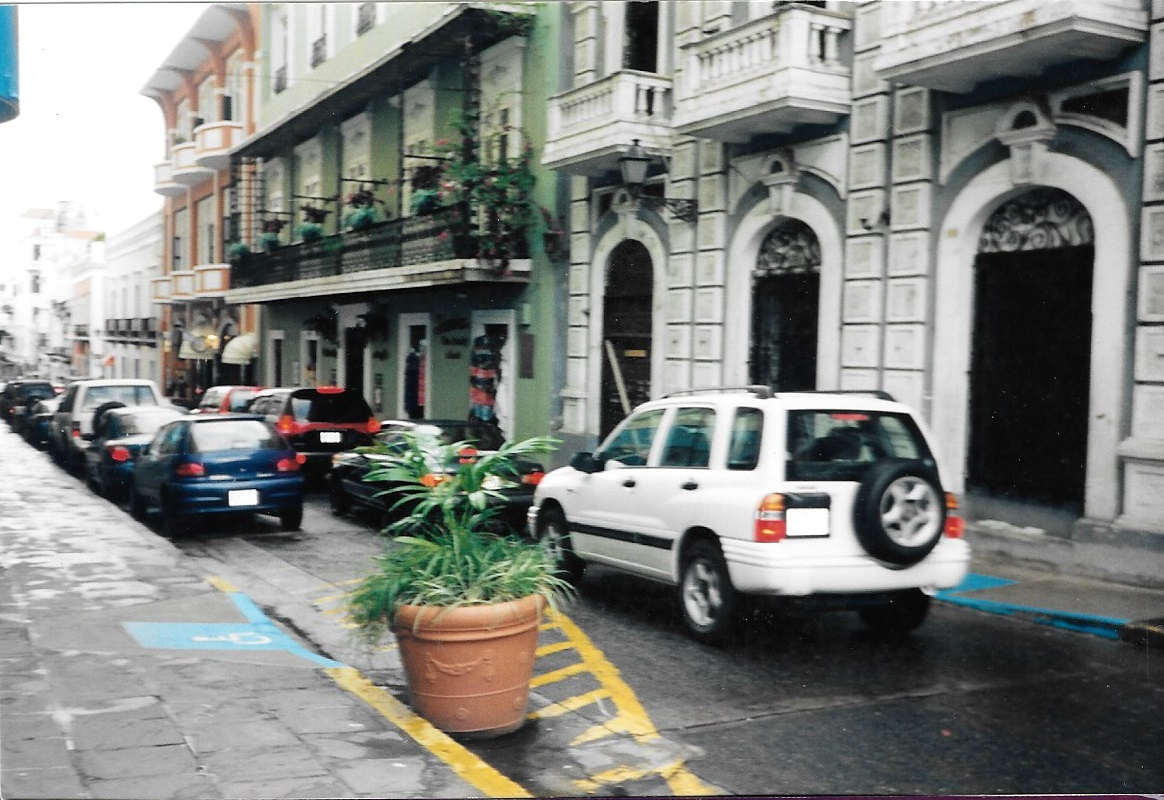
Traffic in Isleta de San Juan

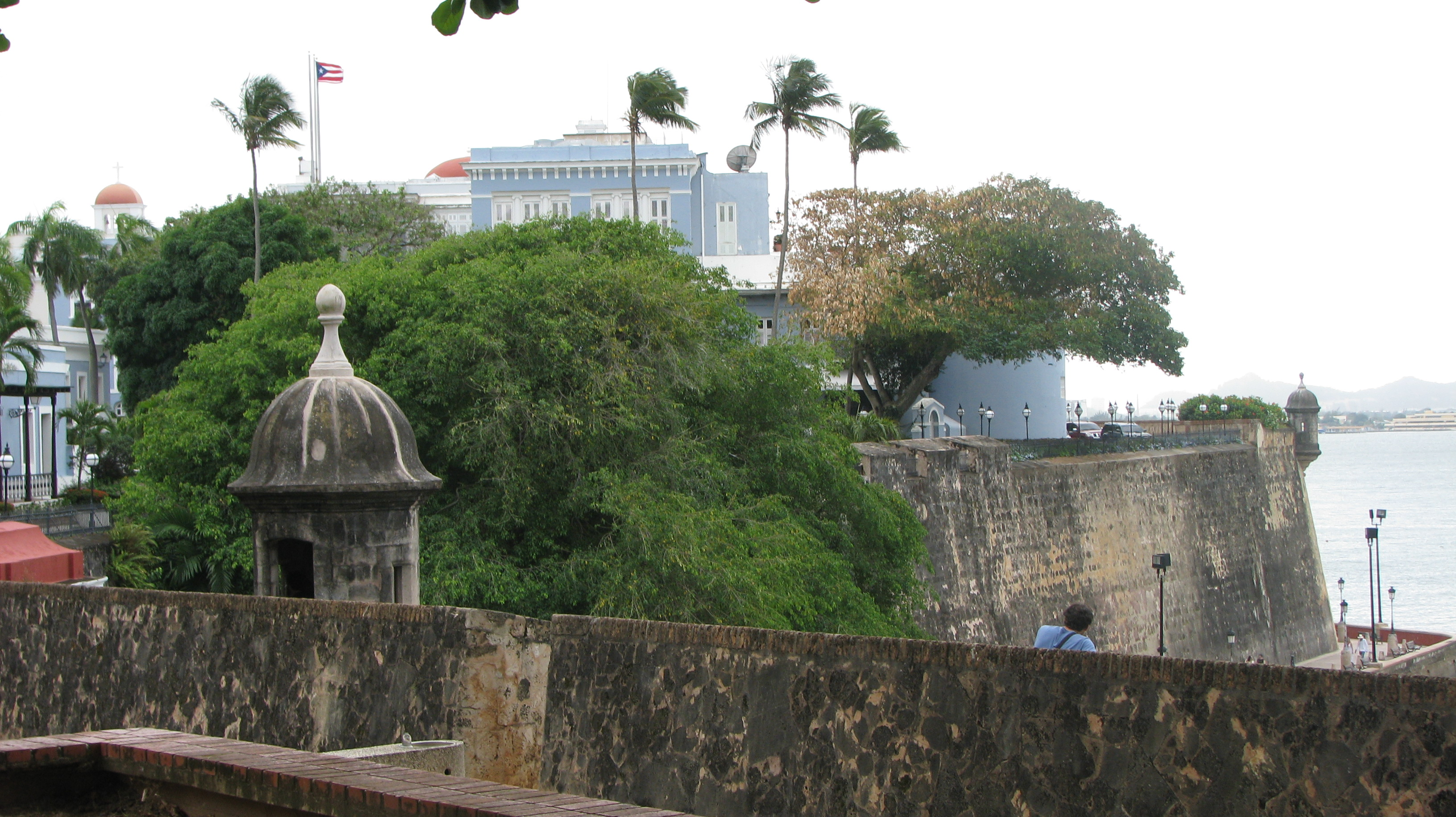
La Fortaleza and City Wall of San Juan in Isleta de San Juan

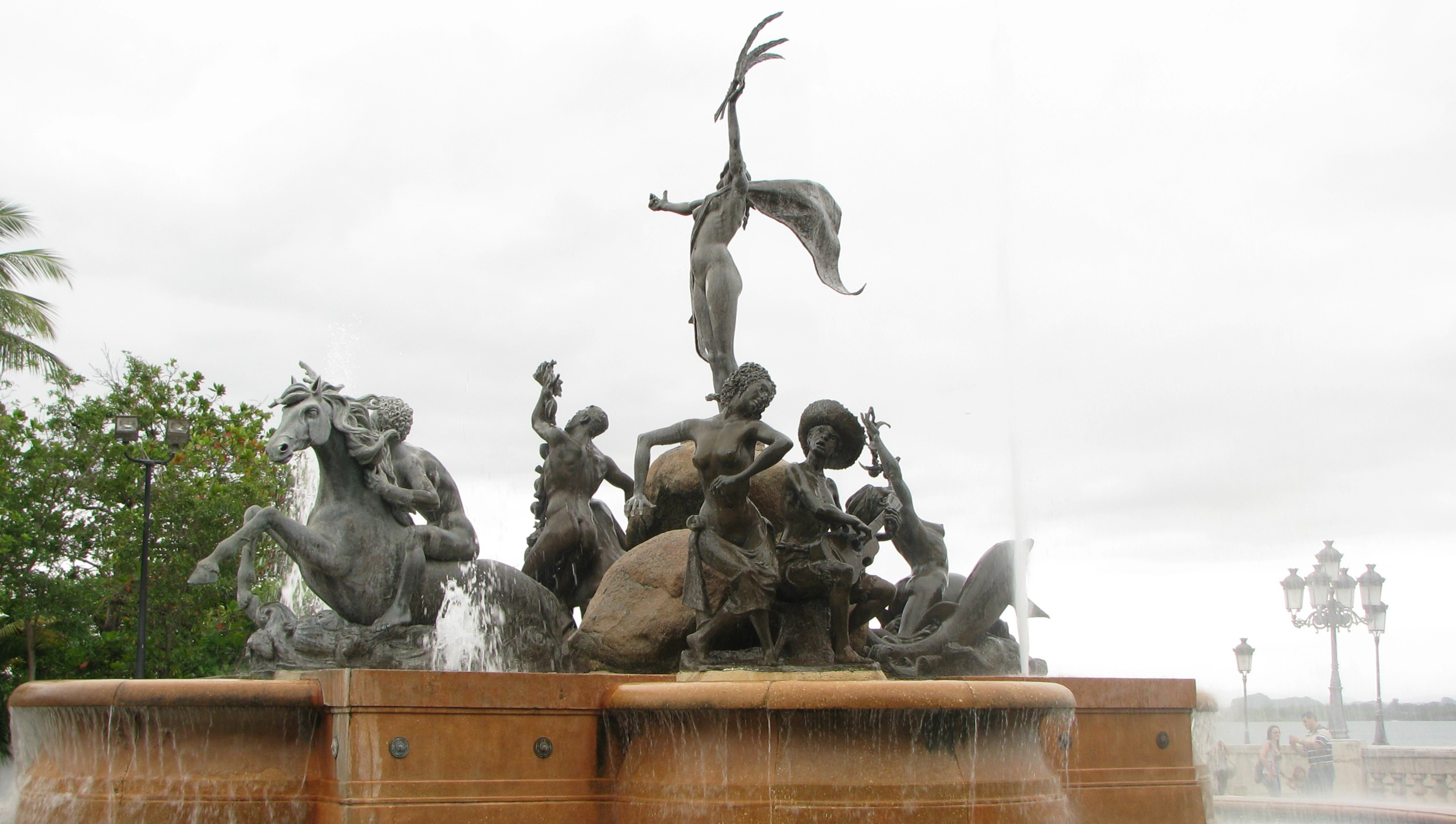
Fuente Raíces (Roots Fountain) on Paseo de La Princesa in Old San Juan

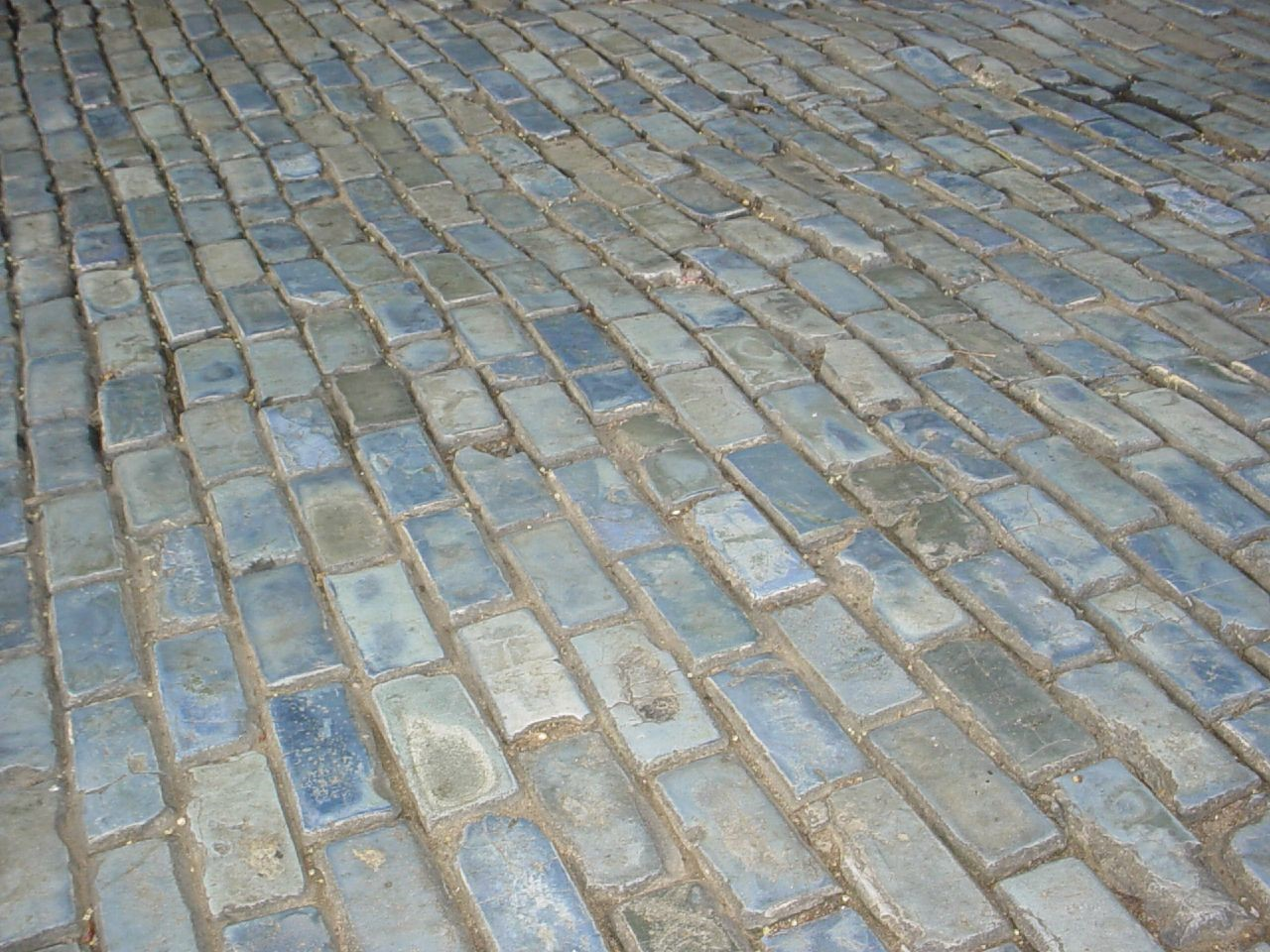
Blue cobblestone streets of Old San Juan
