= Puerta de Tierra, San Juan =

Subbarrio of San Juan Antiguo in Puerto Rico

Puerta de Tierra
- Subbarrio
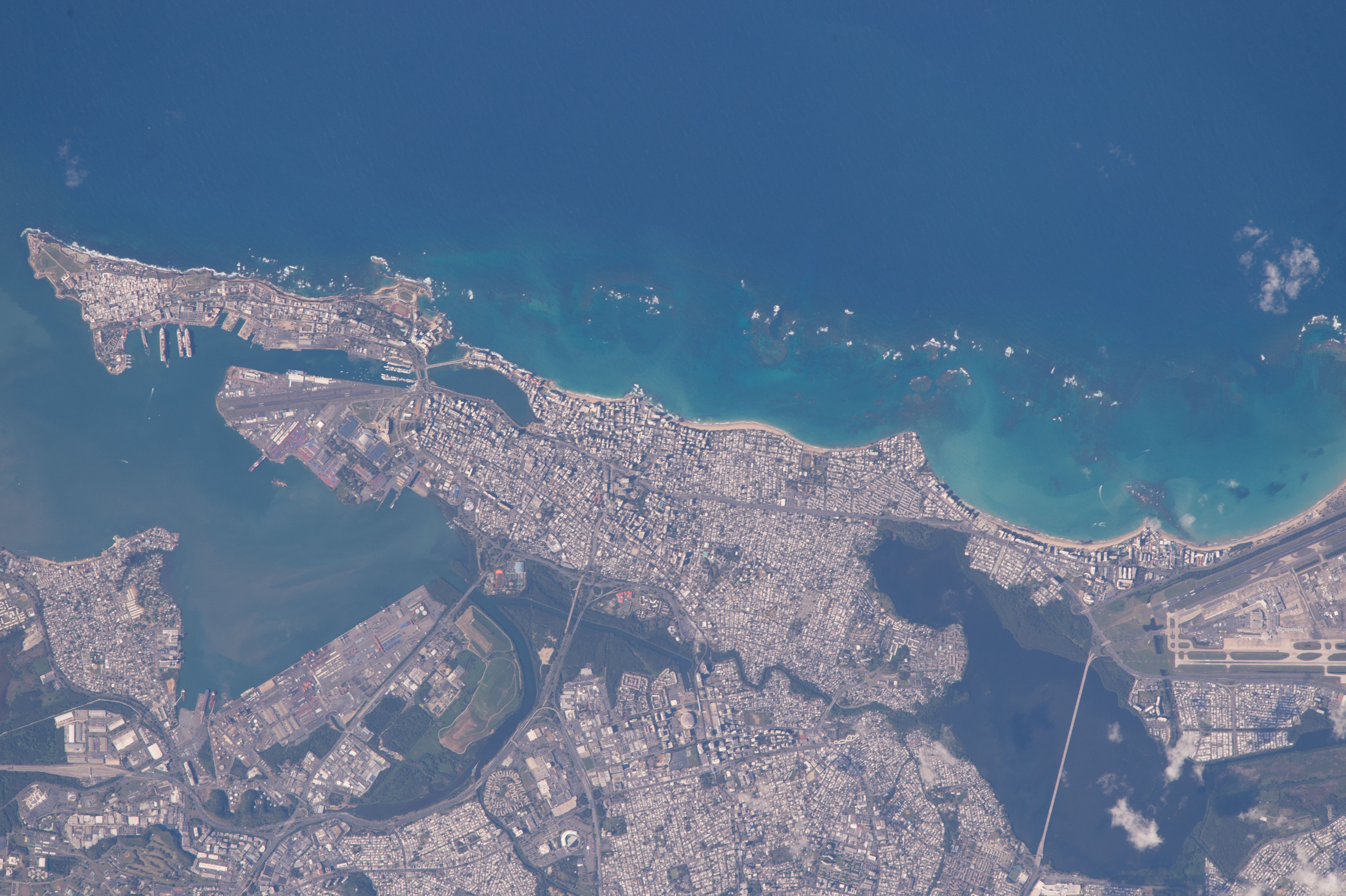
- Satellite image of Puerta de Tierra within San Juan Antiguo alongside Santurce

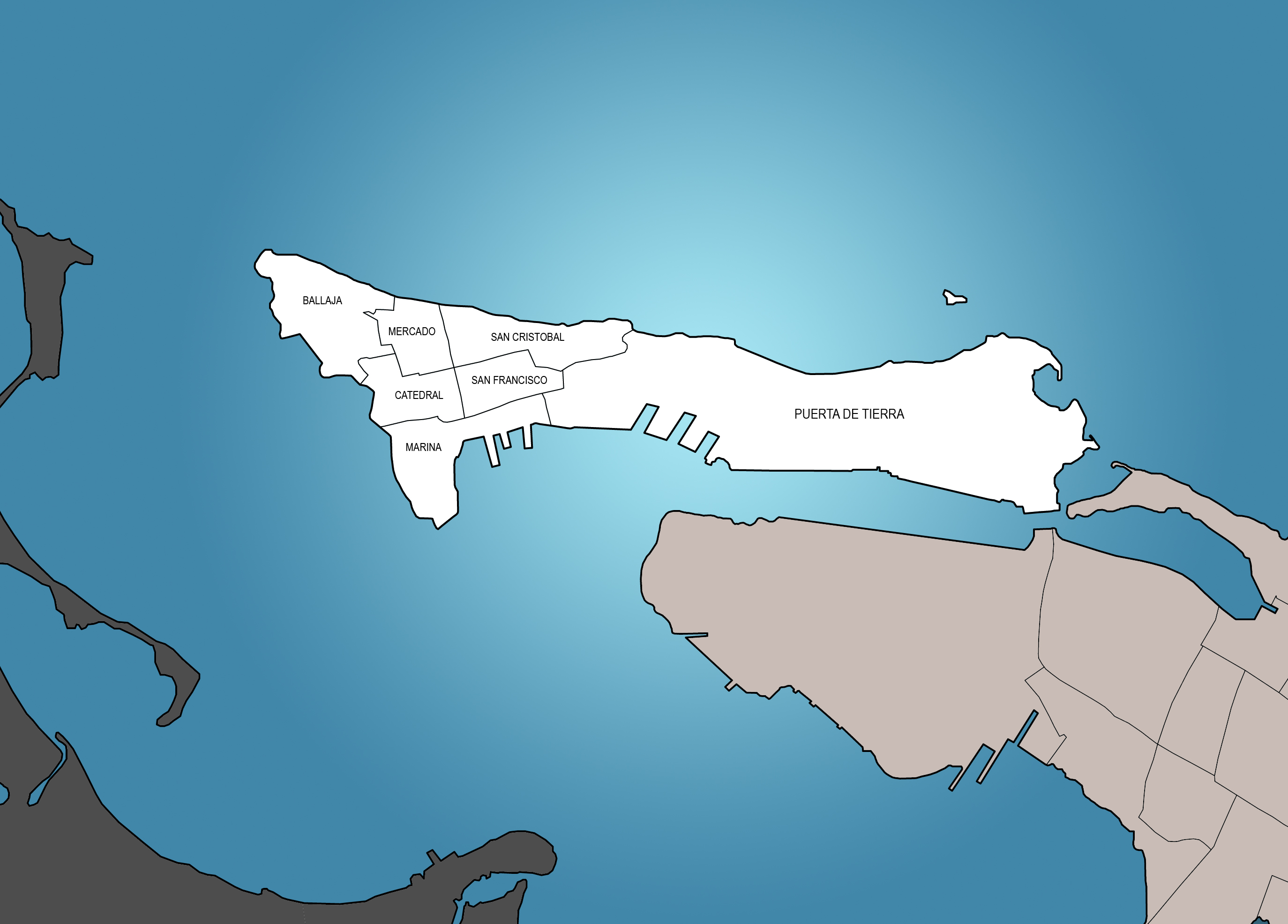
- Puerta de Tierra within San Juan Antiguo

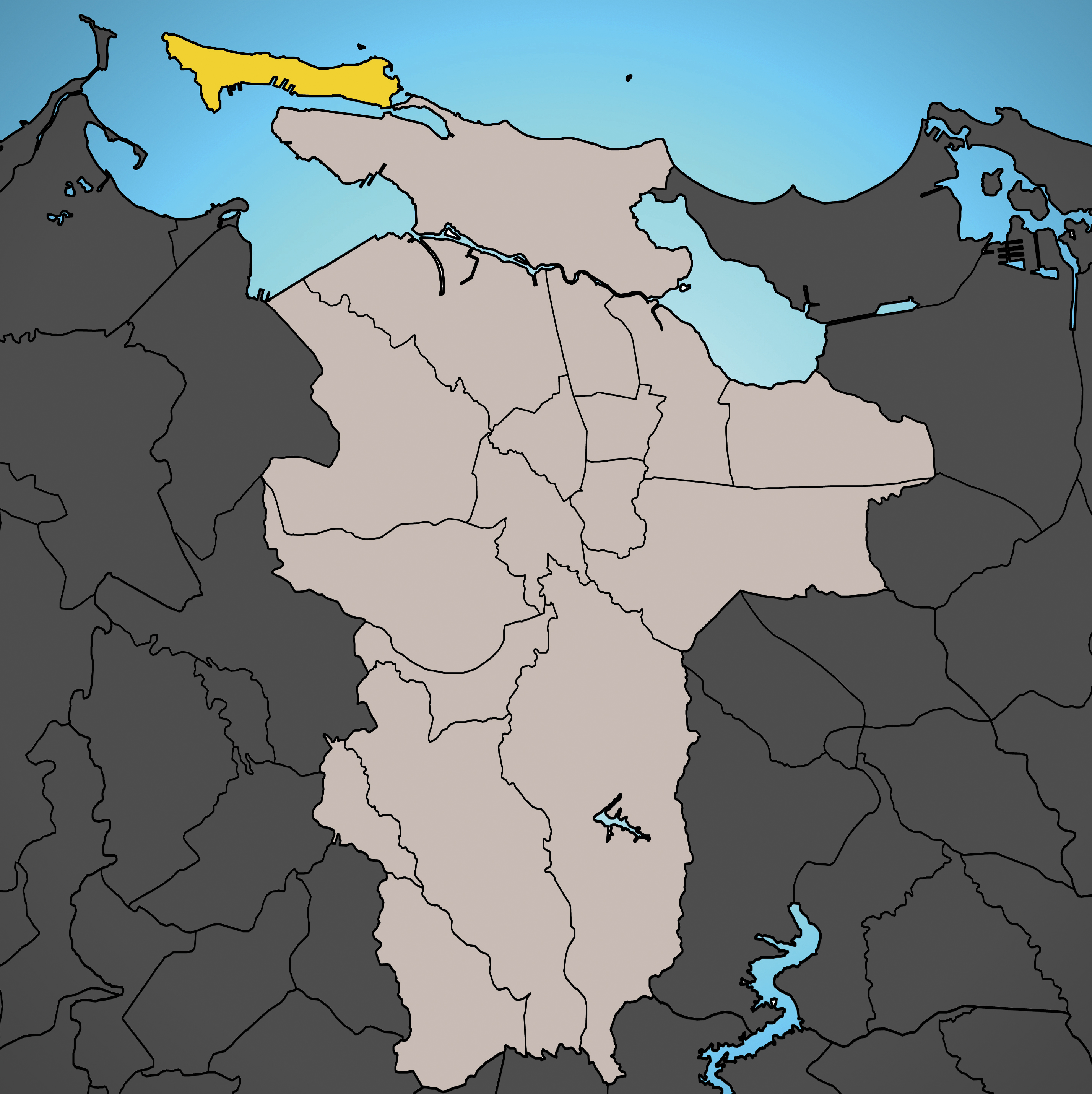
- San Juan Antiguo shown in yellow within San Juan shown in light gray

- Puerta de Tierra, San Juan Antiguo, San Juan, Puerto Rico
- Coordinates: 18°27′42″N 66°05′47″W
- Commonwealth: Puerto Rico
- Municipality: San Juan

Area
  - Land: 0.60 sq mi (1.6 km^{2})

Population (2010)
  - Total: 2,924
- Time zone: UTC−4 (AST)
- Area code: 00906
- Puerta de Tierra Historic District
- U.S. National Register of Historic Places
- U.S. Historic district
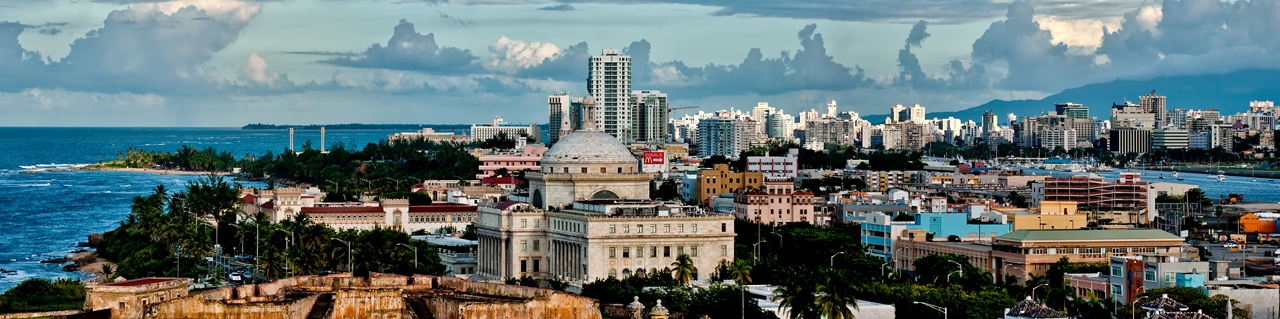
- Puerta de Tierra skyline with the Puerto Rico Capitol in the foreground
- Architectural style: various
- NRHP reference No.: 100002936
- Added to NRHP: October 15, 2019

Puerta de Tierra is a subbarrio (subdistrict) occupying the eastern portion of the Islet of San Juan and the barrio of San Juan Antiguo in the municipality of San Juan, Puerto Rico. The name Puerta de Tierra (Spanish for land gate) derives from the former eastern gated entrance to the walled city of San Juan where Plaza Colón (formerly Santiago Square, named after the Puerta de Santiago) is today. With a population of 2,924 as of 2010, this is the most populated area of San Juan Antiguo. On October 15, 2019, it was added to the National Register of Historic Places.

== History ==
=== Indigenous history ===
Before the arrival of the Europeans to Puerto Rico, Puerta de Tierra (along with Old San Juan) formed part of a smaller islet which was populated by the Taíno. Remains of a small indigenous fishing village have been found where the Puerto Rico National Guard Museum stands today, however most archaeological sites in the area have been destroyed and lost during the construction of the Muñoz Rivera Avenue and surrounding buildings.

=== Spanish colonization ===
The Spanish began the colonization of Puerto Rico in 1508 when Juan Ponce de León founded Caparra, the first permanent settlement in the island, located in the southern part of the Bay of San Juan (today part of Guaynabo). This Spanish village was abandoned in 1519 when the Spanish founded the settlement of Puerto Rico de San Juan Bautista (modern-day Old San Juan) across the bay. The area where Puerta de Tierra is located became critical for the settlement and the defense of the Islet of San Juan as it represented the closest part of the islet to the main island of Puerto Rico. This area, later referred to as El Boquerón, was separated from the main island by the San Antonio strait (today known as the San Antonio Channel). The first bridge across the San Antonio Channel was built by enslaved Taínos between 1520 and 1521 as entrusted by the Order of Saint Jerome (or Hieronymites).

One of the first witch-hunts in the New World occurred in Puerta de Tierra in 1594 when bishop and inquisitor Don Nicolás Ramos accused a group of people of African descent of celebrating pagan rituals just outside of the settlement of San Juan. The accused were tortured and forced to reject their beliefs, although three women who did not comply were burned at the stake by orders of the Holy Inquisition.

=== San Juan's eastern expansion ===
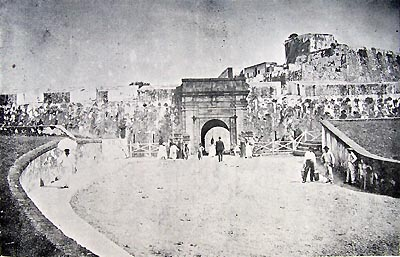
Puerta de Santiago, also known as Puerta de Tierra, today Plaza Colón, is the namesake of this subdistrict.

Construction of the fortified wall system of San Juan began in 1634. Although the area outside the city walls occupying the east side of Old San Juan was almost uninhabited prior to the 19th century, this area represents the first urban expansion of San Juan during the colonial period. Some of the settlers of the area around this time were freed families originating from the British, Dutch and Danish colonies in the Caribbean. While most residences were wooden huts and bohíos, this represents the first eastward demographic expansion of the colonial city of San Juan. Most of the huts were located along the eastern walls and the Puerta de Santiago (Santiago Gate). Due to the fact that this was the main entrance by land to the fortified city, the gate was referred to as Puerta de Tierra.

The area was further settled after the eastward expansion of the batteries of Fort San Cristóbal in 1771 and the construction of the Camino Real (today the Ponce de León Avenue) later in 1810. The area was attacked by the British during the 1797 Battle of San Juan under the command of Sir Ralph Abercromby and Sir Henry Harvey, during the Coalition Anglo-Spanish War. The British invasion was thwarted by the local Spanish militia and regiments of Afro-Puerto Ricans after an unsuccessful siege of San Juan. This event led to the re-fortification of El Boquerón in the eastern end of Puerta de Tierra. Remnants of these military installations can still be seen today in the Luis Muñoz Rivera Park. By 1838, Puerta de Tierra had a population of 168 residents, mainly of African descent.

=== 1867 earthquake and wall demolitions ===
Although the military installations in San Juan were modernized in 1865, the eastern portion of the walls were no longer deemed necessary due to the eastward expansion of the city and were consequently partially demolished. The 1867 Virgin Islands earthquake destroyed the remaining eastern military installations in the area, and a new road and railway station were built with the name of Paseo Virgen de Nuestra de Señora de Covadonga and the Covadonga Terminal, respectively. The Paseo Covadonga exists today under the name of Covadonga Avenue. The San Juan streetcar system was developed along the Camino Real in 1880, during a time when the southern coast of Puerta de Tierra began to be industrially developed as piers and docks were installed along the San Antonio Channel. During this time, Puerta de Tierra became the most populated area in the Islet of San Juan, which is reflected through the construction of a new parish church (Church of San Agustín), bullfight arenas, schools and new streets. Although the area was quickly developing, most of the residential structures were unplanned, something that also happened along the northern walls of the city in La Perla.

=== Spanish–American War ===
The United States took control of Puerto Rico from Spain in the aftermath of the Spanish–American War under the terms of the Treaty of Paris of 1898. In 1899, the United States conducted its first census of Puerto Rico, finding that the population of Puerta de Tierra was 5,453. Puerta de Tierra was badly damaged during the path of the San Ciriaco hurricane (also known as the 1899 Puerto Rico Hurricane).

=== 20th century ===
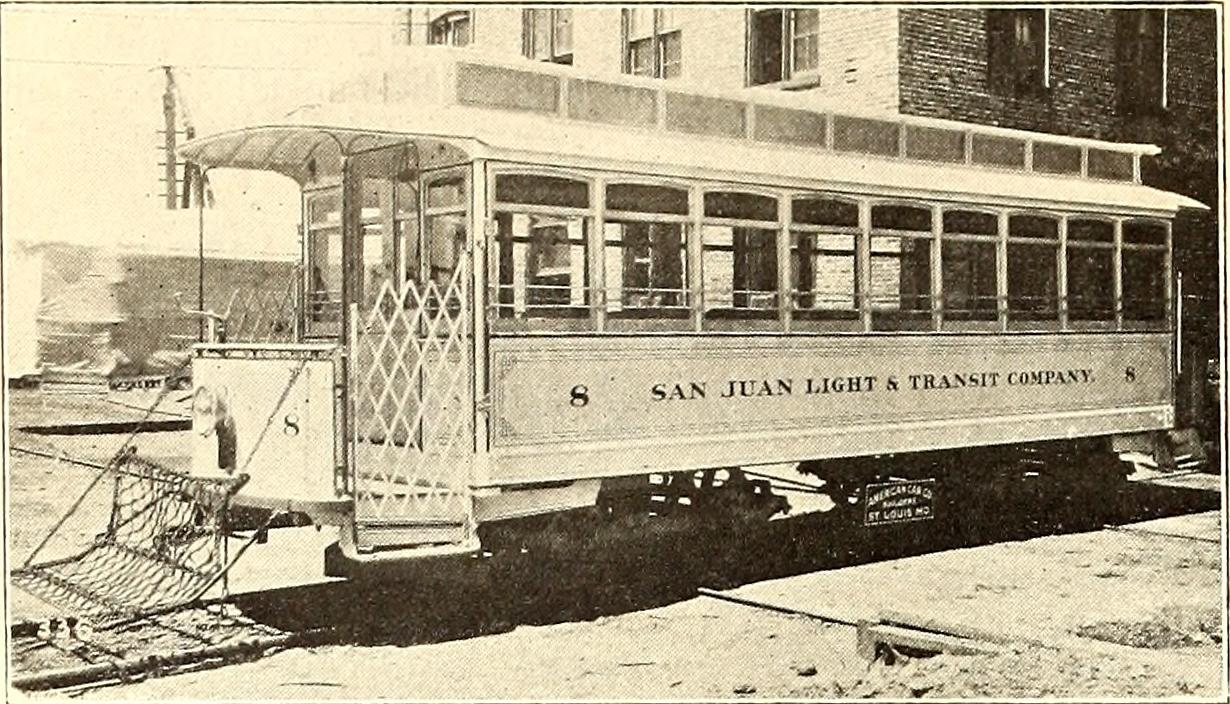
San Juan streetcar in 1901.

Puerta de Tierra went through large changes during the beginning of the 20th century. Barriada Miranda was the first formally established public residential area in the zone in 1903 along the Camino Real, now called the Carretera Central. Politician Luis Muñoz Rivera suggested in 1907 that the territorial capitol of Puerto Rico should be built in the largest of the empty parcels of land where the eastern city walls used to be, next to the Tapia Theater. The first public elementary school, José Julián Acosta School, was also built here in 1907. The portion of this road that passed through Puerta de Tierra was popularly known as the Broadway of Puerto Rico by the media due to the large number of theaters and cultural performing institutions being built at the time. Tres Banderas Theater, for example, was the first cinema to be established in the area in 1910. Some of the first non-Catholic Christian institutions were also established here in the 1910s such as the first Methodist church and the first Lutheran church in San Juan.

The 1928 Okeechobee hurricane (known locally as the San Felipe Segundo hurricane) caused approximately 300 deaths in Puerta de Tierra. This and other disasters such as disease outbreaks negatively affected the development of the area in the first half of the 20th century. Puerta de Tierra and its docks were also the site of large and important workers' protests during this time. The Second World War, however, brought an increase in the industrial activity in the area. The first use of condominiums as public housing in the United States also occurred during this time in Puerta de Tierra, the first of which was the Condominio San Luis, and multi-level housing soon replaced wooden single-family houses.

== Cityscape ==
Historical population
Year	Pop.	±%
1899	5,435	—
1910	10,836	+99.4%
1920	15,716	+45.0%
1930	11,936	−24.1%
1935	13,356	+11.9%
1940	11,480	−14.0%
1950	9,114	−20.6%
1960	8,075	−11.4%
1970	6,143	−23.9%
1980	5,522	−10.1%
1990	5,366	−2.8%
2000	4,135	−22.9%
2010	2,924	−29.3%
Populations of military and naval reserves are not included from 1899 through 1940.

Puerta de Tierra conforms the eastern portion of the Islet of San Juan and it is connected to the mainland by bridges (Dos Hermanos and San Antonio) and a causeway. It is bordered by the Atlantic Ocean to the north, El Boquerón and El Condado to the east, the San Antonio Channel to the south and Old San Juan immediately to the west. Puerta de Tierra is the site of many of Puerto Rico's government buildings, including the Capitol of Puerto Rico. With a 2000 census population of 4,135 and a land area of 0.60 sq. miles (1.55 km^{2}), Puerta de Tierra is the largest and most populous subbarrio of San Juan Antiguo barrio.

In October 2017, Puerta de Tierra won an award from the International Union of Architects, a non-governmental body based in Switzerland which represents the world's architects. Puerta de Tierra was awarded "best public spaces".

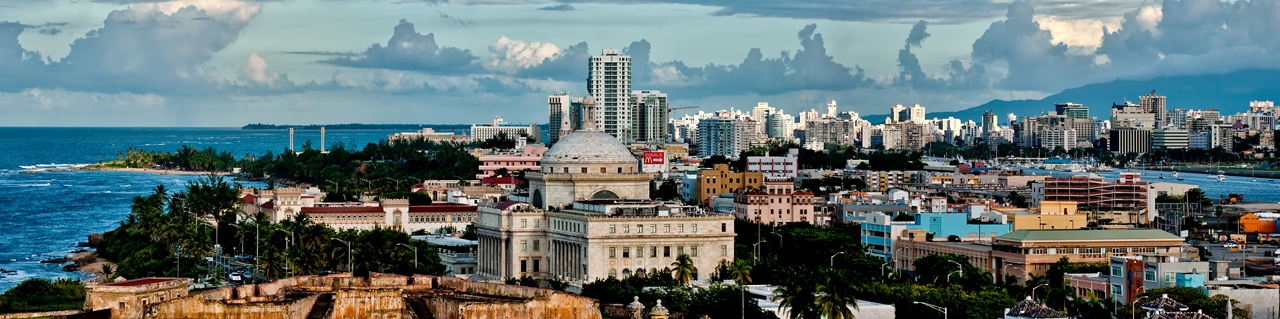
Skyline of San Juan with the Capitol of Puerto Rico and Puerta de Tierra in the foreground.

== National Register of Historic Places ==
On October 15, 2019, Puerta de Tierra was officially added to the National Register of Historic Places. According to Puerto Rican newspaper El Nuevo Dia, Bibiana Hernández had worked for decades to have Puerta de Tierra added to the US National Register of Historic Places (NRHP) and was overjoyed at the news. Many people such as artist and community spokesman, Jesús “Bubu” Negrón, have worked along with Arleen Pabón-Charneco, a Puerto Rican architect and author of the NRHP nomination forms, to bring more visibility to the area.

The community expressed concerns saying the area was starting to experience gentrification. This designation now makes the entire Isleta de San Juan (San Juan Islet) a historic district, along with the Old San Juan Historic District (which is also on the small isle) and the designation should make it easier to prioritize its care with federal funds for these purposes. There were already thirteen structures in Puerta de Tierra on the NRHP, including El Falansterio, Brambaugh School and the José Celso Barbosa Graded School.

There is a phrase seen on murals around Puerta de Tierra that says Aquí vive gente ("People live here") and the community has been planning to create a museum about Puerta de Tierra.

== Attractions ==
=== Hotels and Beaches ===
- Caribe Hilton Hotel
- Normandie Hotel
- Escambrón Beach Club
- Escambrón Beach

=== Parks and Recreation Sites ===
- Luis Muñoz Rivera Park
- Third Millennium Park
- Sixto Escobar Stadium

== Government Service Sites ==
=== Federal Government of the United States ===
- U.S. Food and Drug Administration Office
- U.S. National Guard Office

=== Commonwealth of Puerto Rico Legislative Branch ===
- Capitol of Puerto Rico (Capitolio de Puerto Rico)

=== Commonwealth of Puerto Rico Judicial Branch ===
- Supreme Court of Puerto Rico (Tribunal Supremo de Puerto Rico)

=== Autonomous Municipality of San Juan ===
- Casa Cuna (former US Navy Radio Station)
- City Center for Children Protection Shelter
- Dr. Quevedo Báez Health Center
- Medical Primary Care and Emergency Room Services

== Notable people from Puerta de Tierra ==
- Antonia Pantoja – educator, social worker, feminist, civil rights leader and founder of ASPIRA, the Puerto Rican Forum, Boricua College and Producer, first Puerto Rican woman to receive the American Presidential Medal of Freedom

== Gallery ==
Sites in and around Puerta de Tierra:

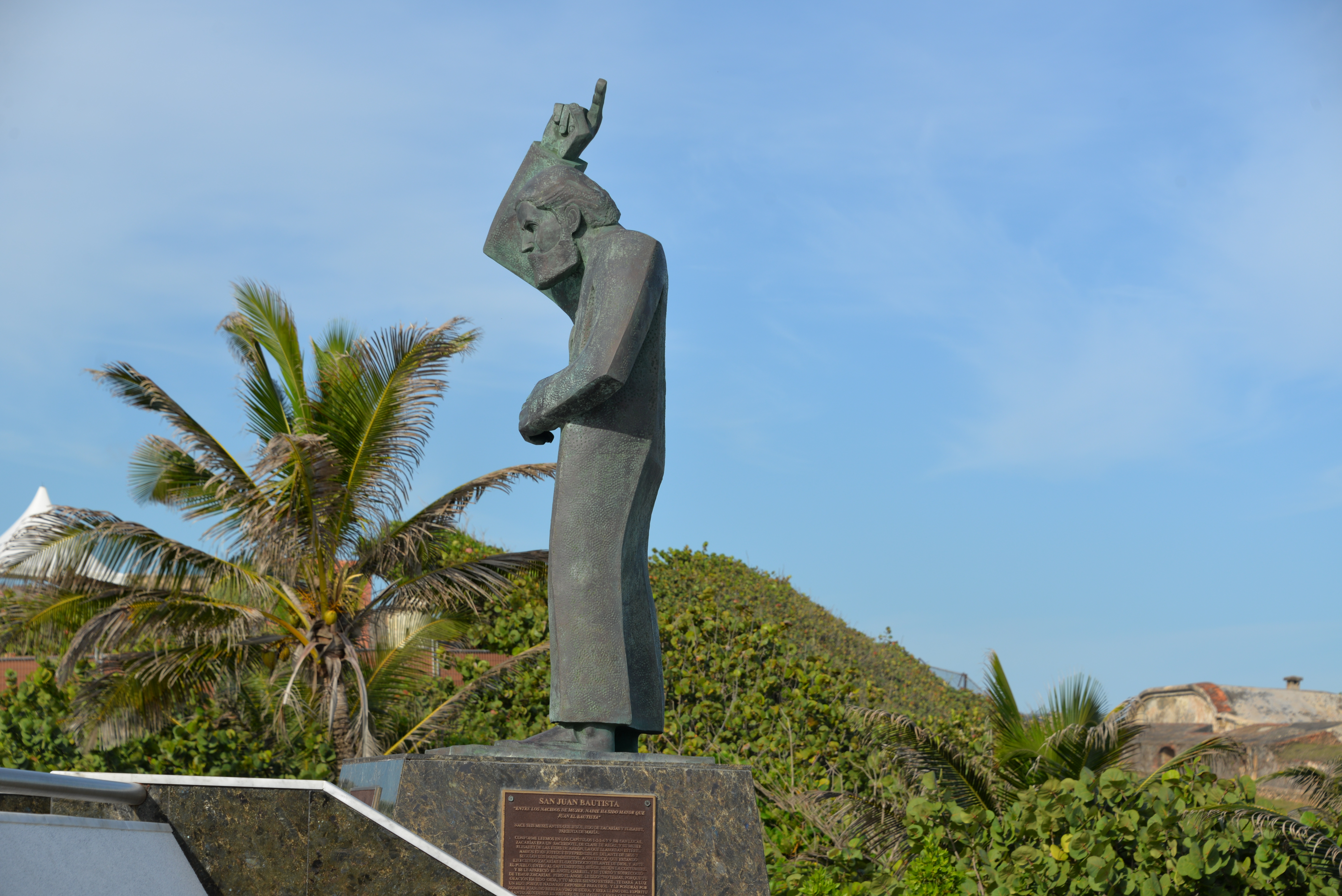
Statue at Plaza San Juan Bautista, near the Capitol of Puerto Rico

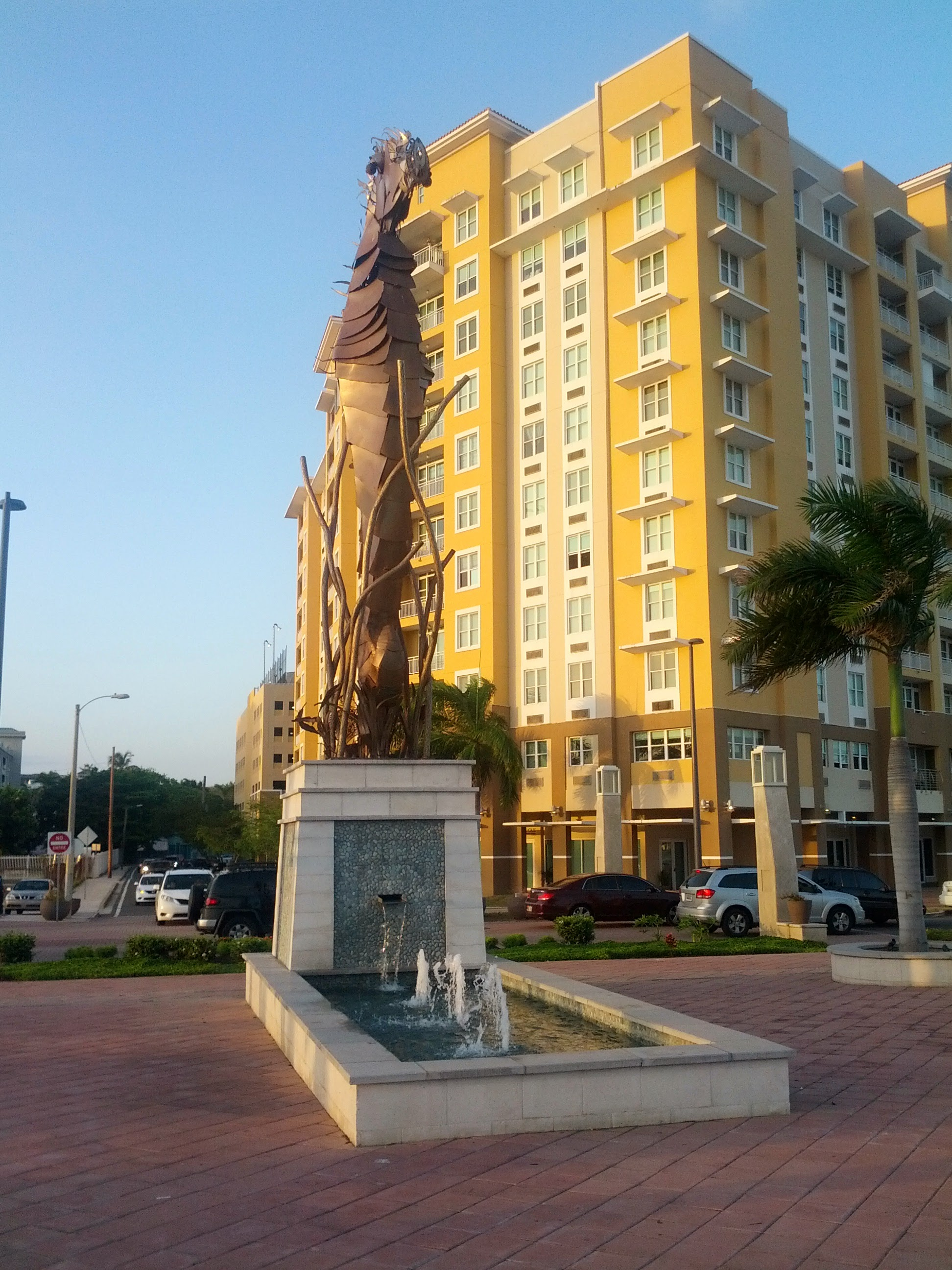
Building

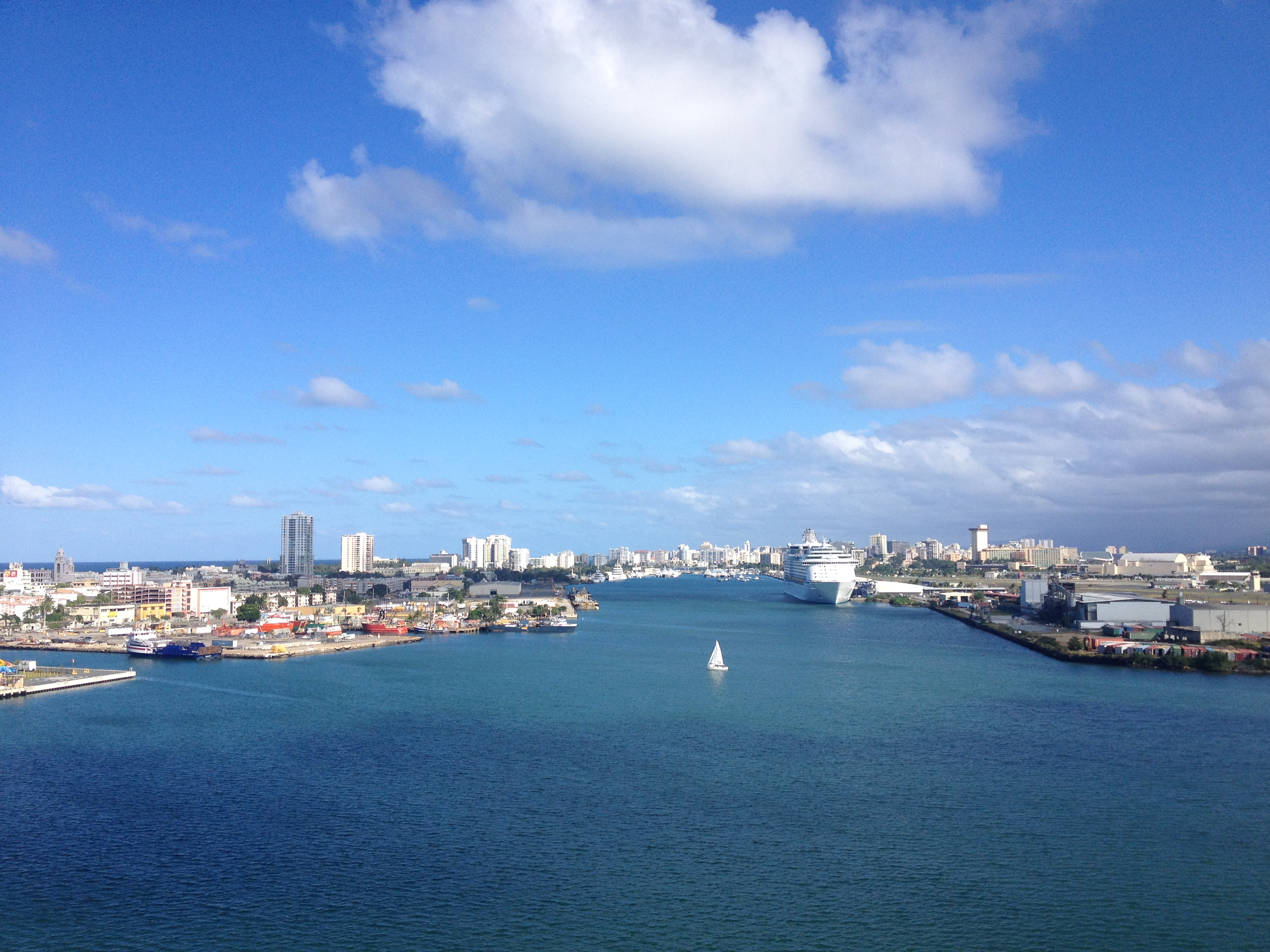
Ship

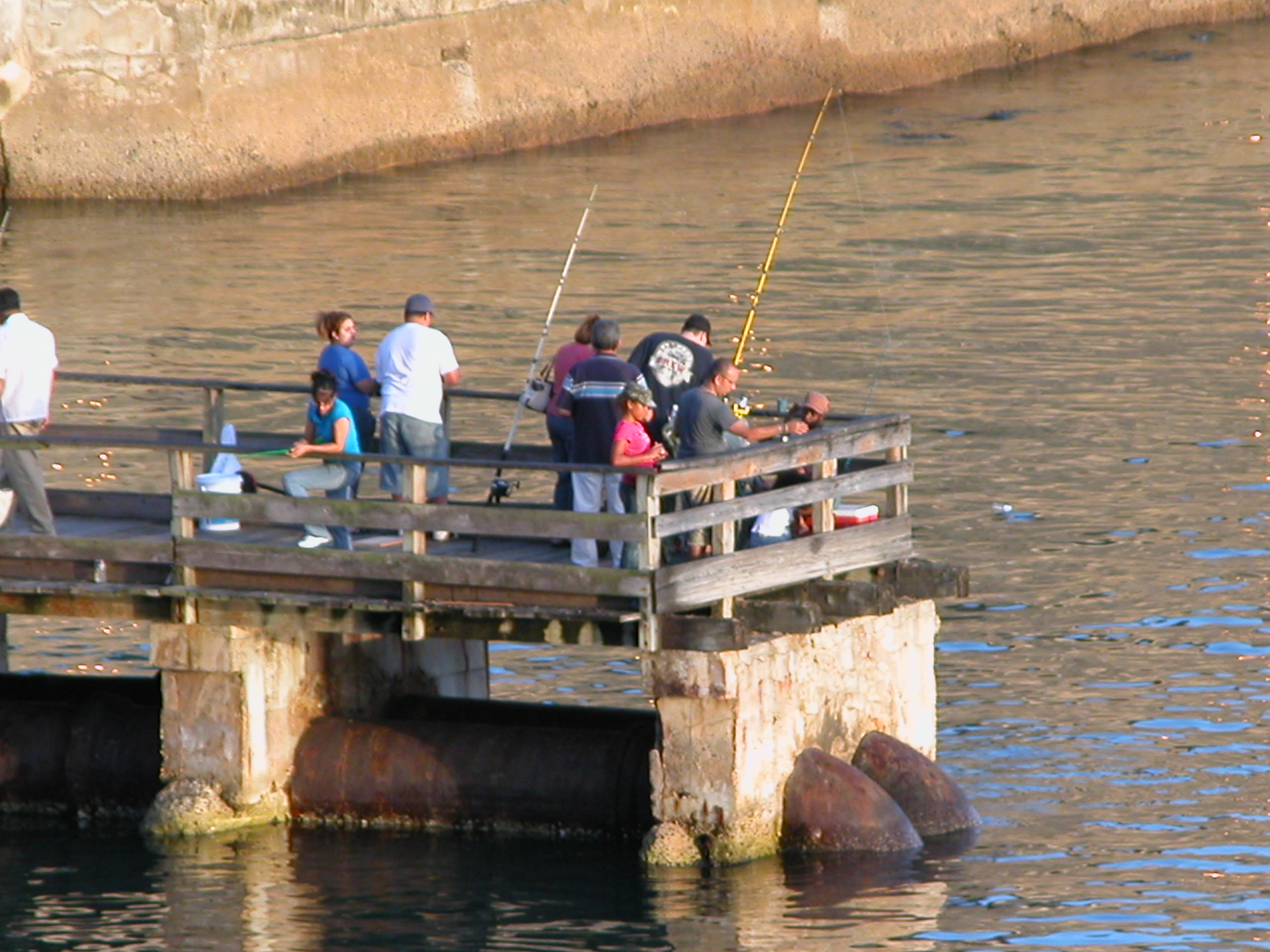
Fishing from a pier

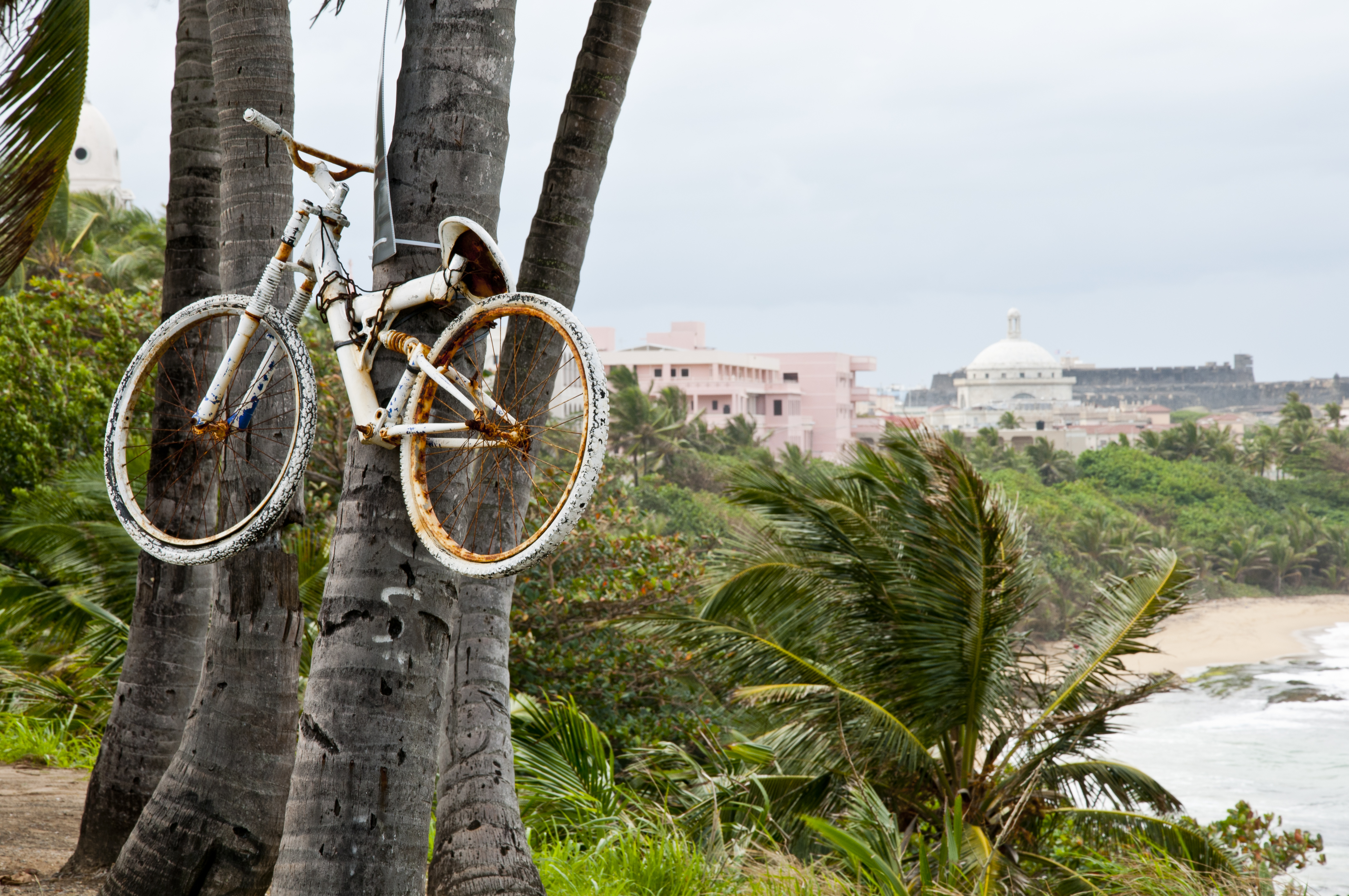
Bike (memorial on tree)

== See also ==
- San Juan Bay
