= José Celso Barbosa Graded School =

- Escuela Graduado Jose Celso Barbosa
- U.S. National Register of Historic Places
- U.S. Historic district – Contributing property
- Puerto Rico Historic Sites and Zones
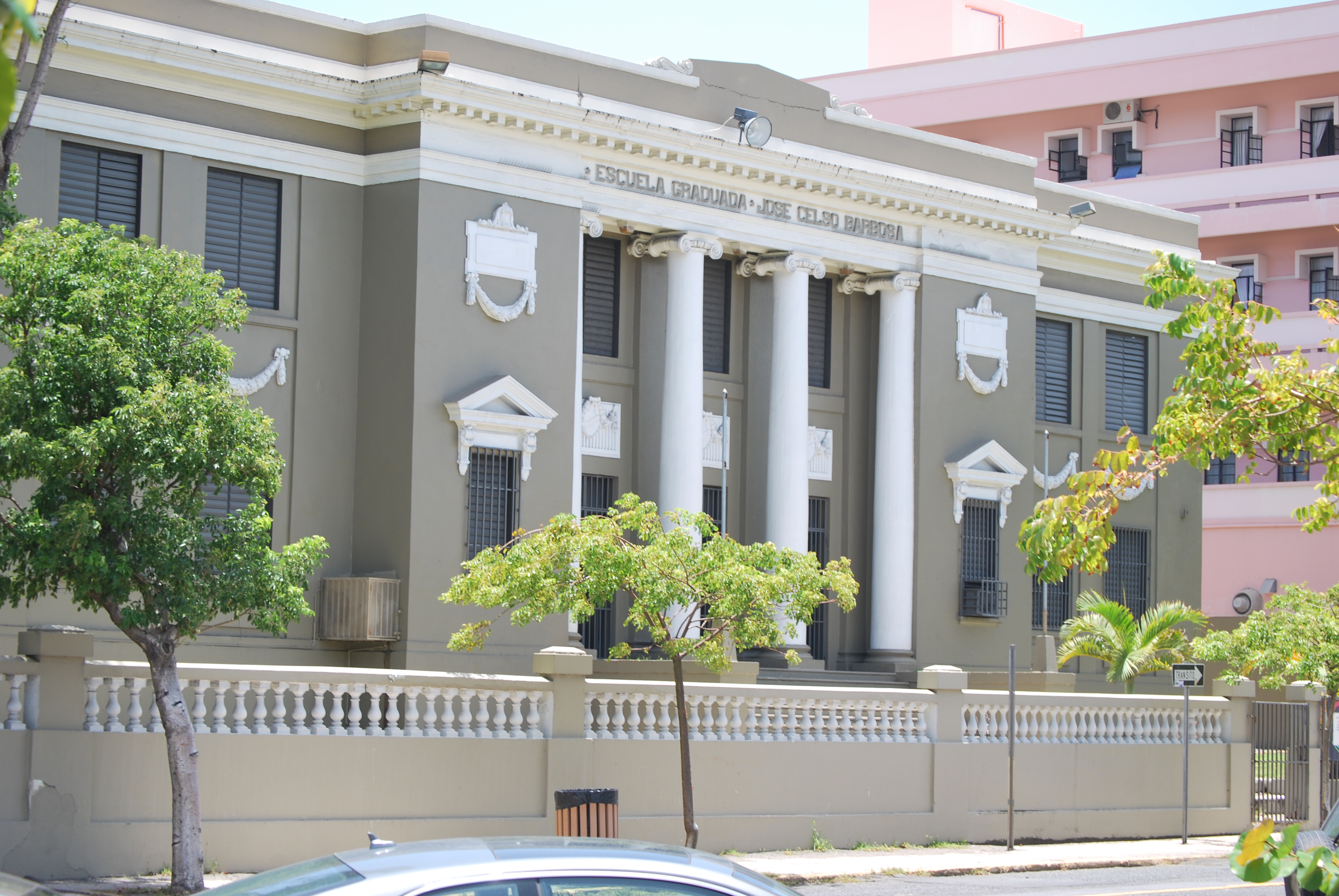
- José Celso Barbosa in 2014.

- Location within Puerto Rico
- Location: Ponce de León Ave. in Puerta de Tierra, San Juan, Puerto Rico
- Coordinates: 18°27′58″N 66°06′05″W
- Built: 1927
- Architect: del Valle & Co.
- Architectural style: Classical Revival
- Part of: Puerta de Tierra Historic District (ID100002936)
- NRHP reference No.: 89000406
- RNSZH No.: 2000-(RMSJ)-00-JP-SH

Significant dates
- Added to NRHP: May 19, 1989
- Designated CP: October 15, 2019
- Designated RNSZH: February 3, 2000

The José Celso Barbosa Graded School (Spanish: Escuela Graduada José Celso Barbosa) is a historic school building located in the Puerta de Tierra historic district in the city of San Juan, Puerto Rico. The school is named after Puerto Rico statehood movement founder Dr. José Celso Barbosa and has been listed in the National Register of Historic Places since 1989, and on the Puerto Rico Register of Historic Sites and Zones since 2000. The school was built between 1924 and 1927 and designed by the firm del Valle & Co. in a Neoclassical-style with the intention of making it a public secondary school for recently graduated students from the nearby Brambaugh School. It forms part of the monumental sequence of buildings and memorials that contribute to the Puerta de Tierra Historic District, which also includes the Capitol of Puerto Rico.

== See also ==
- National Register of Historic Places listings in San Juan, Puerto Rico
