= Puerto Rico National Guard Museum =

- Established: August 18, 2002
- Location: San Juan, Puerto Rico
- Type: Military museum
- Owner: Puerto Rico National Guard
- Website: http://www.puertadetierra.info/edificios/museo/museo.htm
- Puerto Rico National Guard Museum
- U.S. Historic district – Contributing property
- Part of: Puerta de Tierra Historic District (ID100002936)
- Designated CP: October 15, 2019

The Puerto Rico National Guard Museum (Spanish: Museo de la Guardia Nacional de Puerto Rico) is a museum in San Juan, Puerto Rico dedicated to the Puerto Rico National Guard. The museum was inaugurated on August 18, 2002 by Major General Emilio Díaz Colón.

The museum takes visitors through the history of Puerto Rico's National Guard tracing its lineage to the Spanish colonial militia predating the English colonies in North America. The story line begins in the sixteenth century and the exhibits highlight the episodes in the military history of Puerto Rico and the impact that Puerto Rican militia and guardsmen have made.

The museum is maintained at two sites, one in San Juan, and the other at the Camp Santiago Training Site in Salinas. The San Juan facility focuses on the history of the Puerto Rican National Guard, and the Salinas facility covers the earlier militia period in Puerto Rico's past. Camp Santiago displays a small collection of aircraft and armored vehicles.
