= Puerto Rico Ilustrado =

Defunct weekly magazine

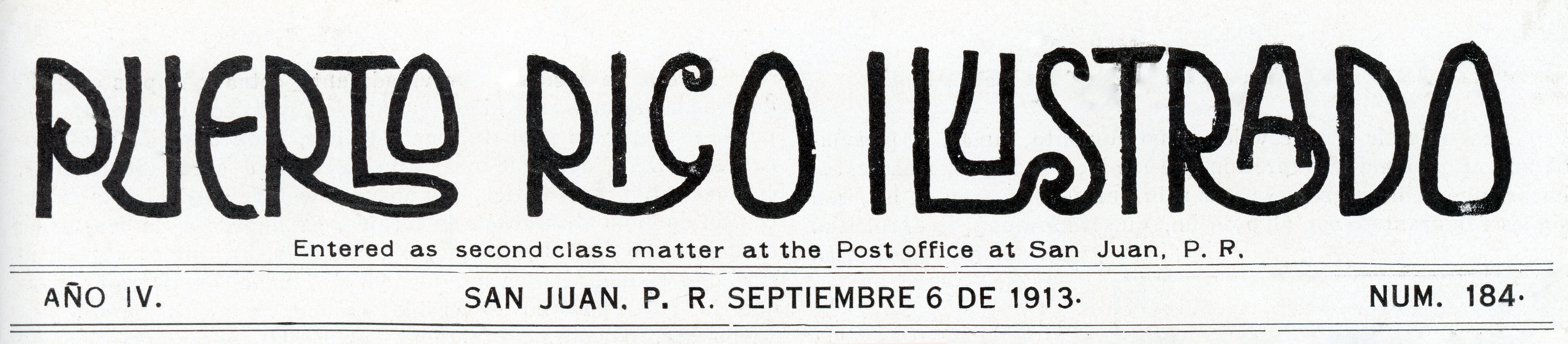
- Director: Jose S. Alegria
- Staff writers: Benjamin Ortiz; Marina Molina; Pura Cecile Lamoutte; Francisco Gonzalez Fagundo; Juan Vicente Rafael; Arturo Castro
- Photographer: Bachrach
- Categories: History, Culture
- Frequency: Weekly
- Publisher: Puerto Rico Ilustrado, Inc.
- Founder: Juan M. Saavedra
- Founded: 6 March 1910
- First issue: 6 March 1910
- Final issue: 2 December 1990
- Company: Puerto Rico Ilustrado
- Country: Puerto Rico
- Based in: San Juan
- Language: Spanish
- OCLC: 17194285

Puerto Rico Ilustrado was a weekly magazine in Puerto Rico. Its first issue was published 6 March 1910 in San Juan, Puerto Rico, with Juan M. Saavedra as administrator. The final issue of Puerto Rico Ilustrado as an independent publication was número 2227, published 27 December 1952.

On 29 January 1966, Puerto Rico Ilustrado returned to publication as a Saturday supplement (suplemento sabatino) within issues of El Mundo newspaper. Puerto Rico Ilustrado changed to a Sunday supplement (suplemento dominical) on 7 June 1970, and remained so until its publication was discontinued by El Mundo in September 1975.

On 20 January 1985, El Mundo resumed publication of Puerto Rico Ilustrado as an insert of the Sunday issues. The final issue of Puerto Rico Ilustrado was published on 2 December 1990, since El Mundo was absorbed by El Nuevo Día less than a week later.
