= Plaza Colón (San Juan) =

Square in San Juan, Puerto Rico

Coordinates: 18.4662°N 66.1121°W

- U.S. Historic district – Contributing property
- U.S. National Historic Landmark District – Contributing property
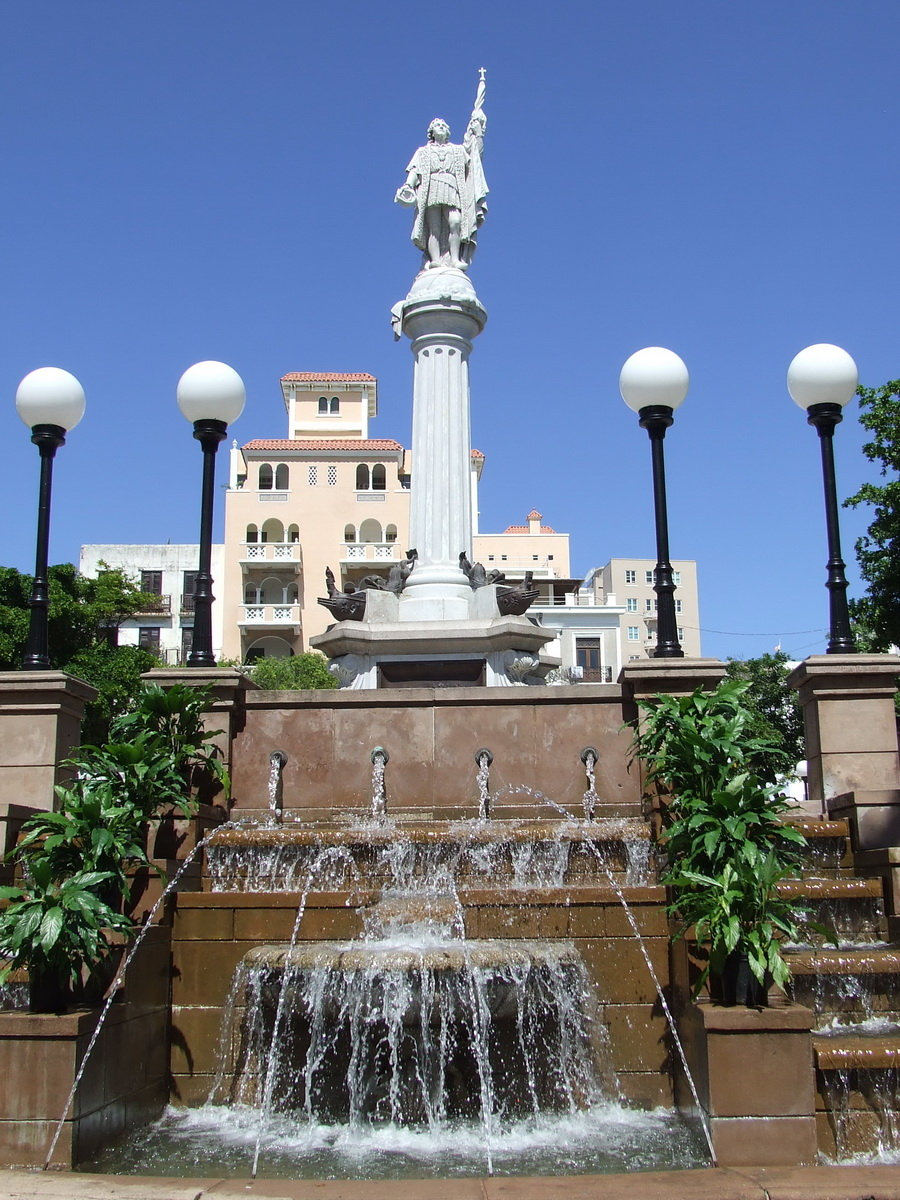
- Christopher Columbus statue and column at the center of the square.
- Location: San Juan Antiguo, San Juan, Puerto Rico
- Built: 1897
- Part of: Old San Juan Historic District (ID72001553 & ID13000284)

Significant dates
- Designated CP: October 10, 1972
- Designated NHLDCP: February 27, 2013

Plaza Colón (Spanish for Columbus square or plaza), formerly called Santiago Square, is a plaza or public town square located in Old San Juan where the easternmost city walls and main city gate (Puerta de Santiago) used to be located. The square today is a popular meeting place and is often used as a starting point for sightseeing in Old San Juan as it is located close to the main cruise ship docks, numerous restaurants, cafés and gift shops, and important landmarks such as San Cristóbal Castle, Tapia Theater, the Old Casino and the Puerto Rico Capitol.

== History ==
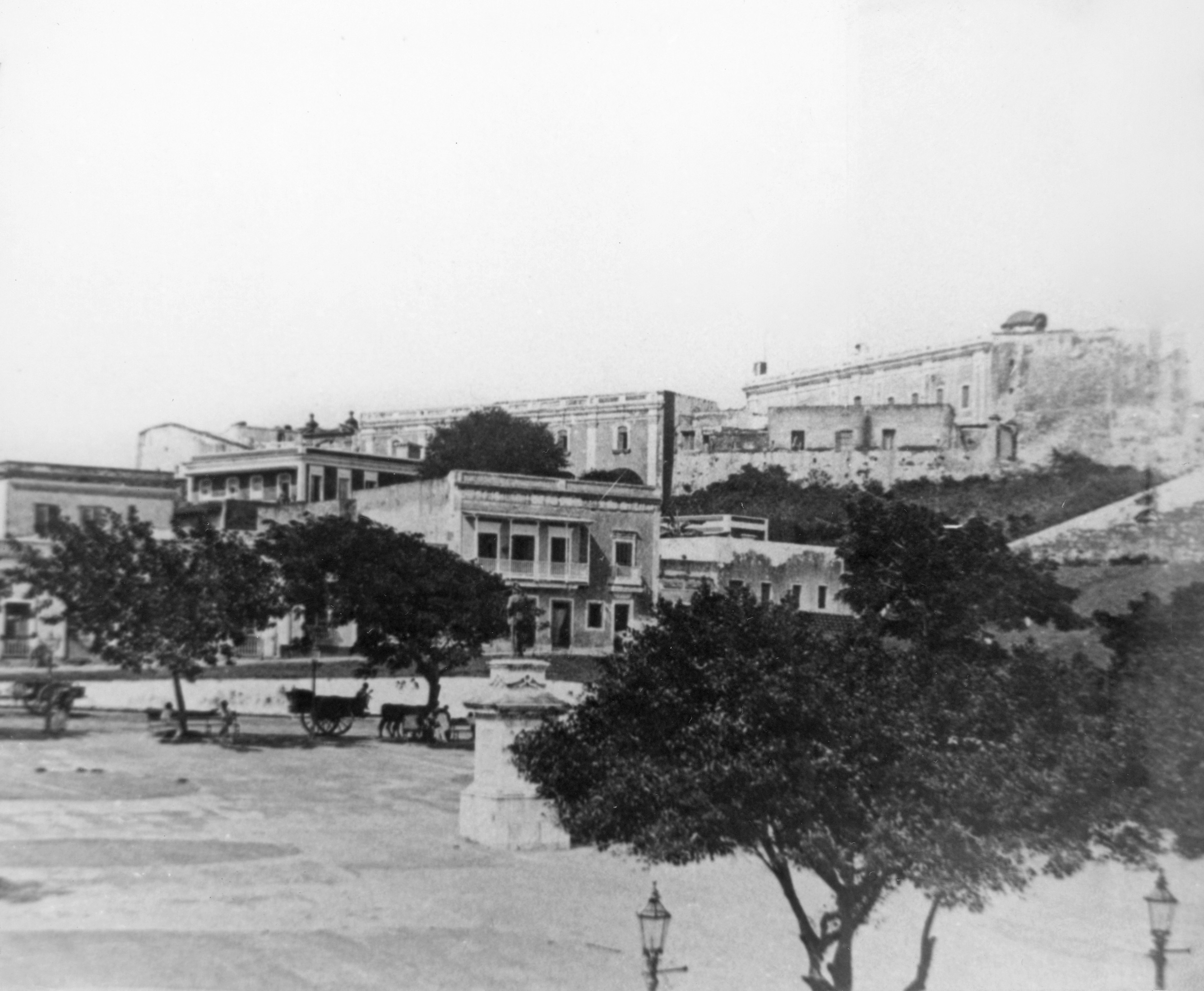
View of Santiago Square in 1892.

The area was originally considered an important transportation and social center in San Juan. The Tapia Theater was built around this time and inaugurated in 1832. The Christopher Columbus statue was first erected in the area in 1893 to celebrate the 400th anniversary of the European "discovery" of Puerto Rico. The statue of Juan Ponce de Leon that used to be located in the center of the square was moved to Plaza San Jose (next to San Jose Church). Before its construction in 1897, the plaza used to be the eastern end of the defensive wall system that surrounded San Juan. It used to be the location of one of the main city gates, Santiago Gate (Spanish: Puerta de Santiago). This section of the wall was torn down in the May of 1897 as it was deemed unnecessary and it was considered an obstacle to San Juan's economic growth as the walled district was isolated from the rest of the modern city. The statue of Columbus atop its column at the center of the square caused people to start referring to the plaza as Plaza Colón rather than Plaza Santiago. The square today is paved with marble tiles and lighted by adorned lamp posts which were installed during the revitalization of the area in the latter half of the 20th century.

== Gallery ==
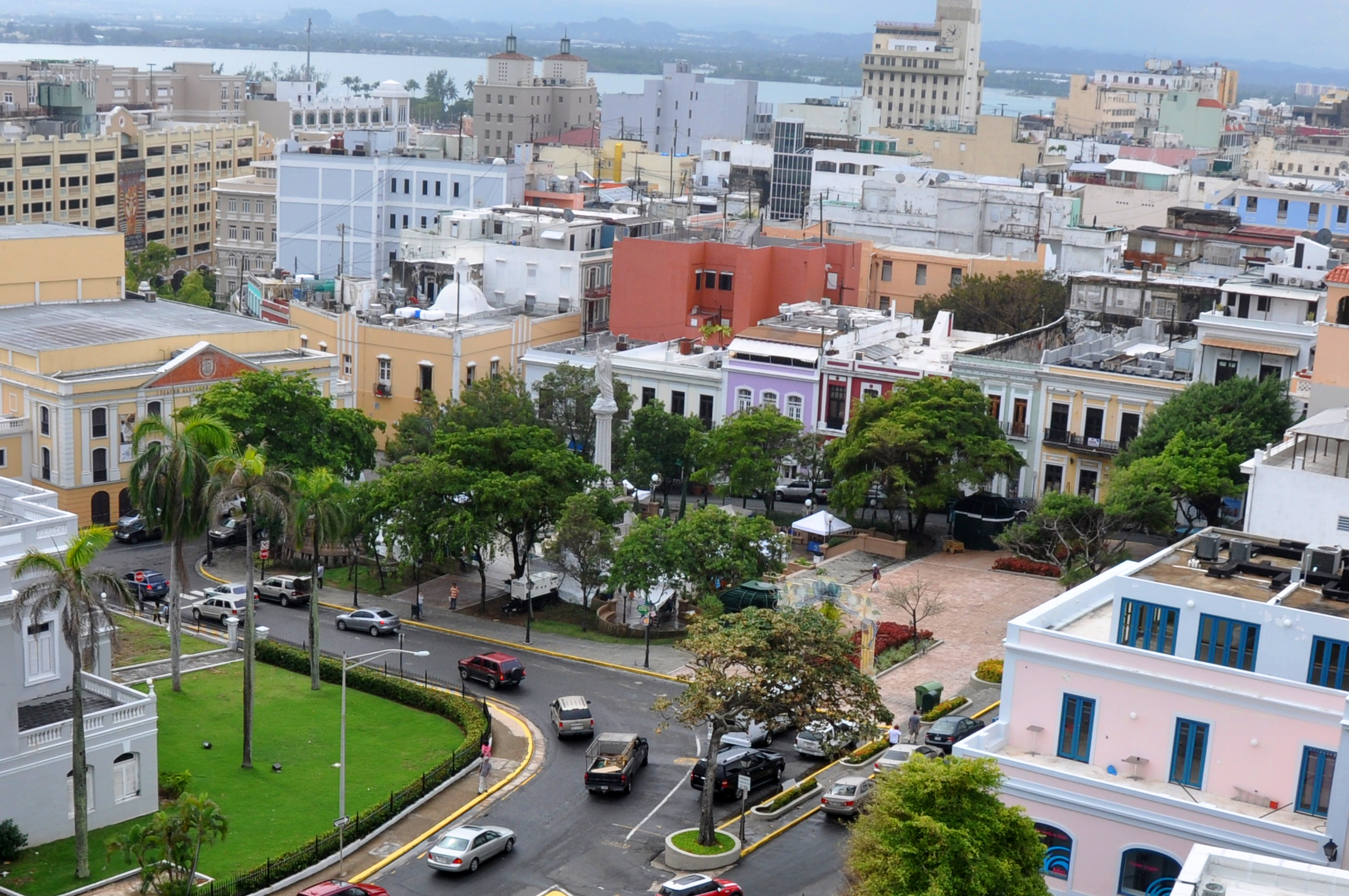
View of the square from San Cristobal Castle.

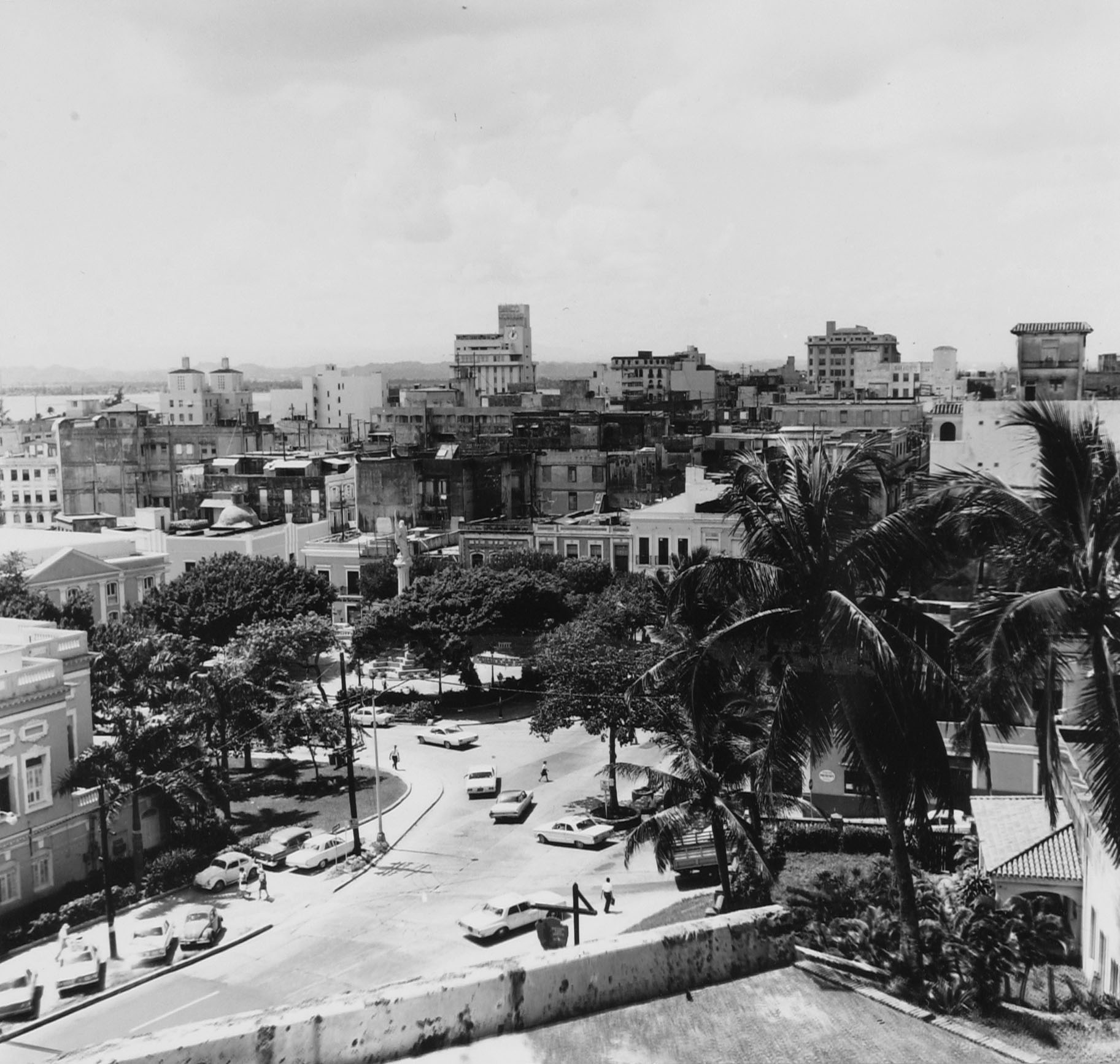
View of the square from San Cristobal Castle in 1964.

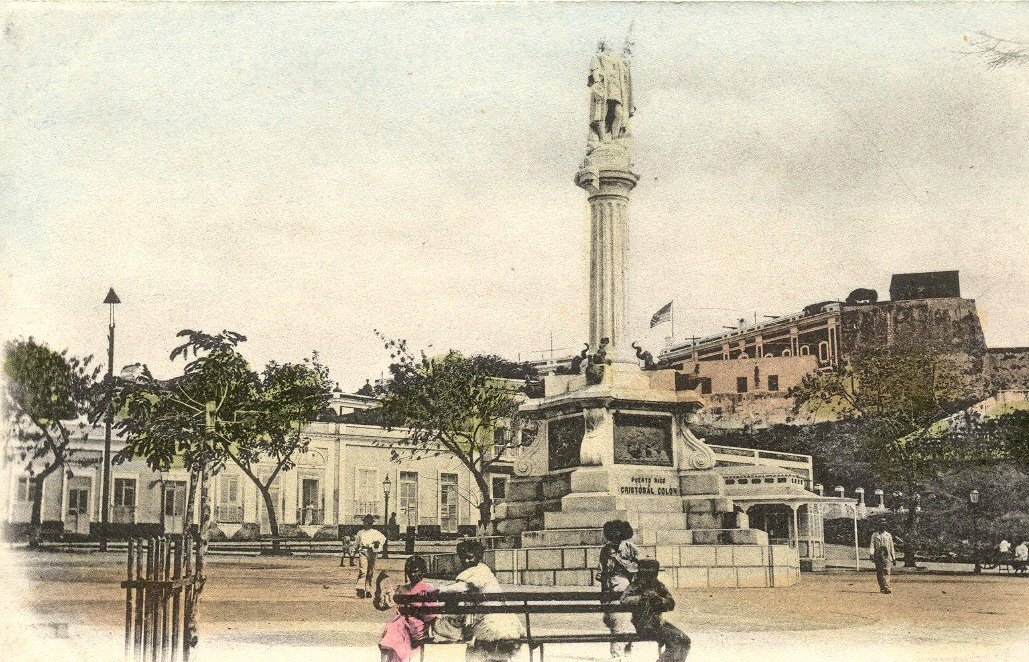
View of the square in a postcard dated approx. from 1900-1915.

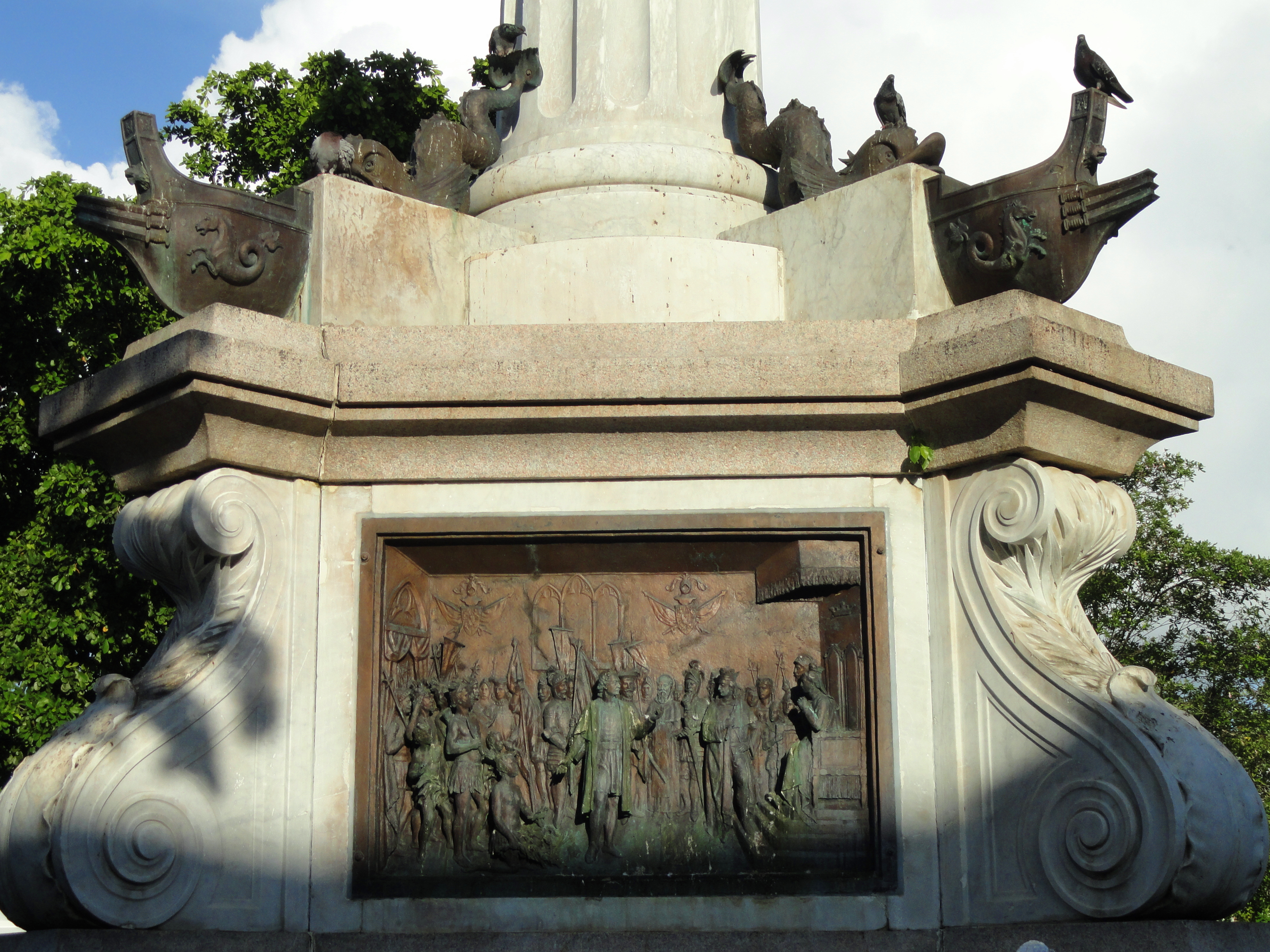
Closeup of one of the plaques of the Columbus column.

== See also ==
- Old San Juan
- Plaza de Armas de San Juan
