= San Juan Bay =

Harbor in Puerto Rico

- Bahía de San Juan (Spanish)
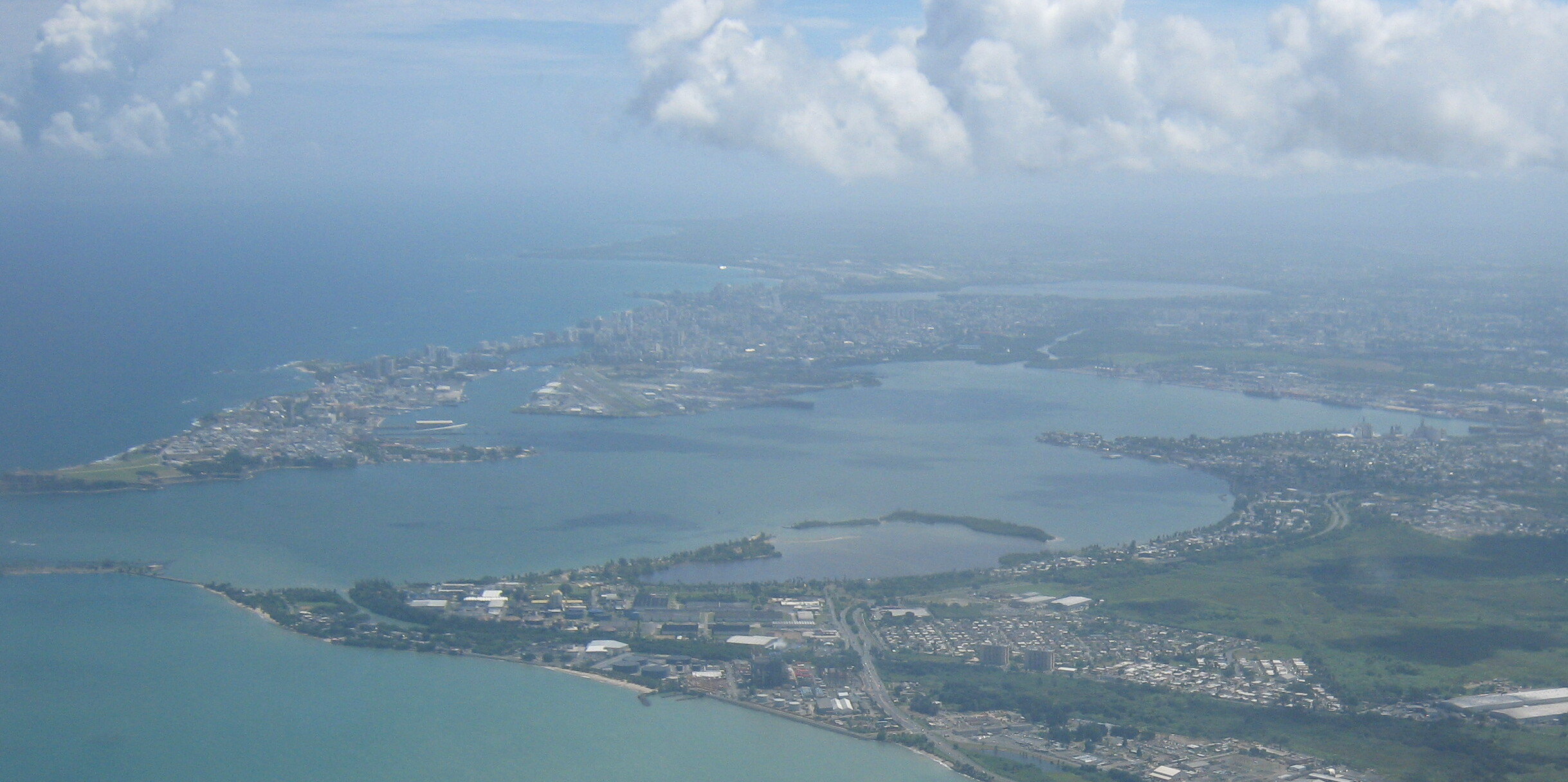
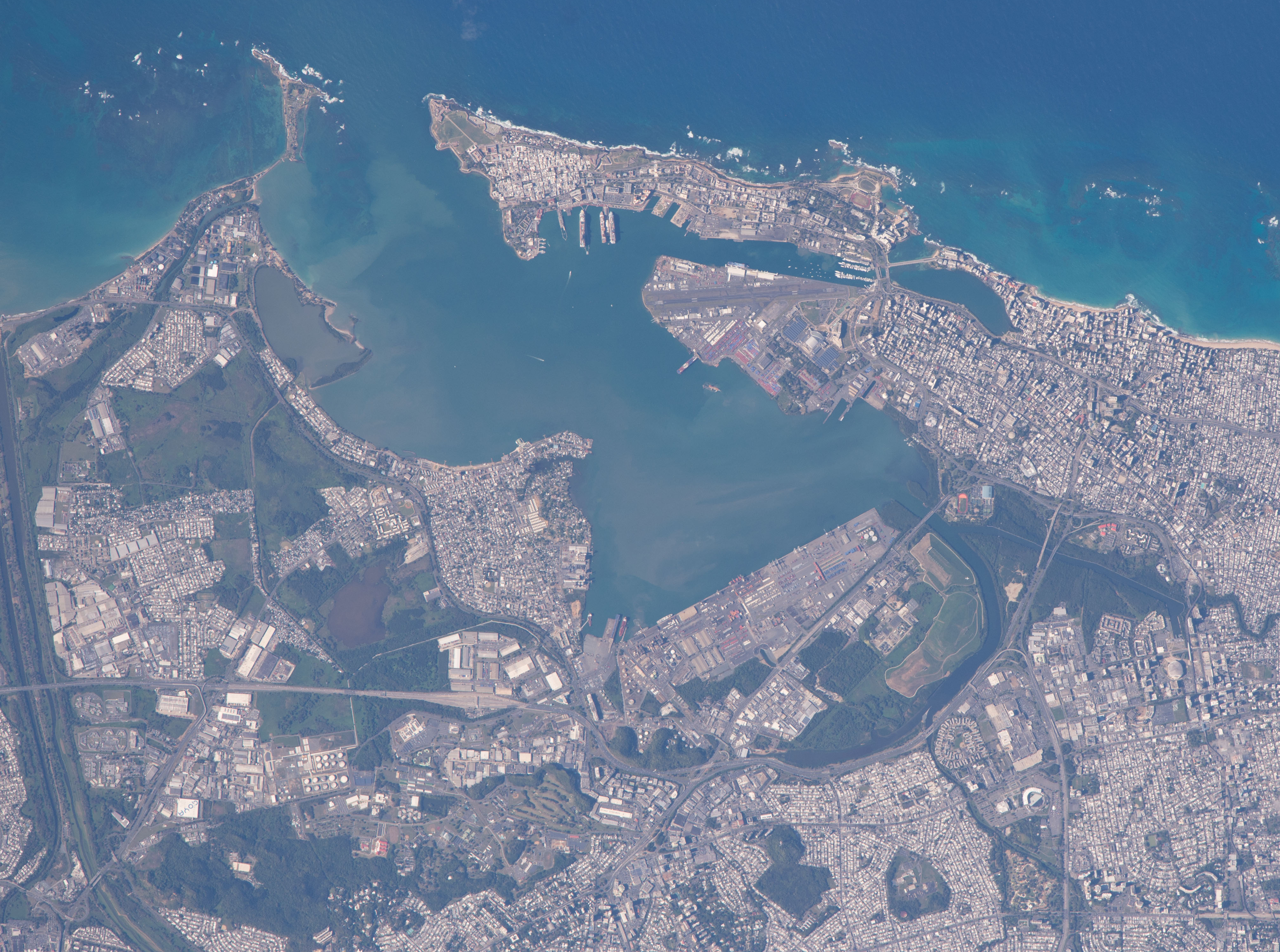
- Aerial view of San Juan Bay, 2009 Satellite view of San Juan Bay, 2016

- NOAA nautical chart of San Juan Bay, 2016
- Interactive map of San Juan Bay
- Location: Metropolitan area of San Juan, Puerto Rico
- Coordinates: 18°27′7.95″N 66°6′51.04″W
- Type: bay, estuary, harbor
- Ocean/sea sources: North Atlantic Ocean
- Managing agency: Department of Natural and Environmental Resources, Puerto Rico Ports Authority
- Salinity: 34.5 (Note: Surface salinity at surface temperature of 27.5°C, as measured on 14 April 1971.)

San Juan Bay (Spanish: Bahía de San Juan) is a deep semi-enclosed bay, estuary, and harbor connected to the North Atlantic Ocean in the northeastern coastal plain of the main island of Puerto Rico. Surrounded by the capital city and municipality of San Juan and adjacent municipalities within its metropolitan area, namely Guaynabo, Cataño, and Toa Baja, the bay is home to Port of San Juan, the primary seaport in the archipelago and island. About 3.5 miles (5.6 km) in length and 0.55 to 2 miles (0.89 to 3.22 km) in width, it is the largest body of water of several interconnected lagoons, channels, rivers, and creeks in the San Juan Bay Estuary, which covers about 83 square miles (215 km^{2}) of land and 14 square miles (36 km^{2}) of water in the San Juan metropolitan area in northeastern Puerto Rico.

Named after John the Baptist, whose name explorer Christopher Columbus gave to the main island of Puerto Rico as San Juan Bautista (Saint John Baptist) upon its discovery during his second vovage in 1493, San Juan Bay was first discovered and explored by Spanish conquistador Juan Ponce de León, who began the European colonization of the archipelago along its shorelines.

In 1508, Ponce de León established the capital city of Caparra, also called Puerto Rico (Rich Port), in the southern side of the Bay, currently part of the Pueblo Viejo barrio of the Guaynabo municipality. In 1521, the city was transferred to San Juan Islet in the northern side of the Bay under the name of San Juan Bautista de Puerto Rico (Saint John Baptist of Rich Port), today the Old San Juan historic quarter in the San Juan capital municipality. The entrance to the bay is guarded by the El Morro fortress in Old San Juan and the El Cañuelo fort in Isla de Cabras in the Palo Seco barrio of the Toa Baja municipality.

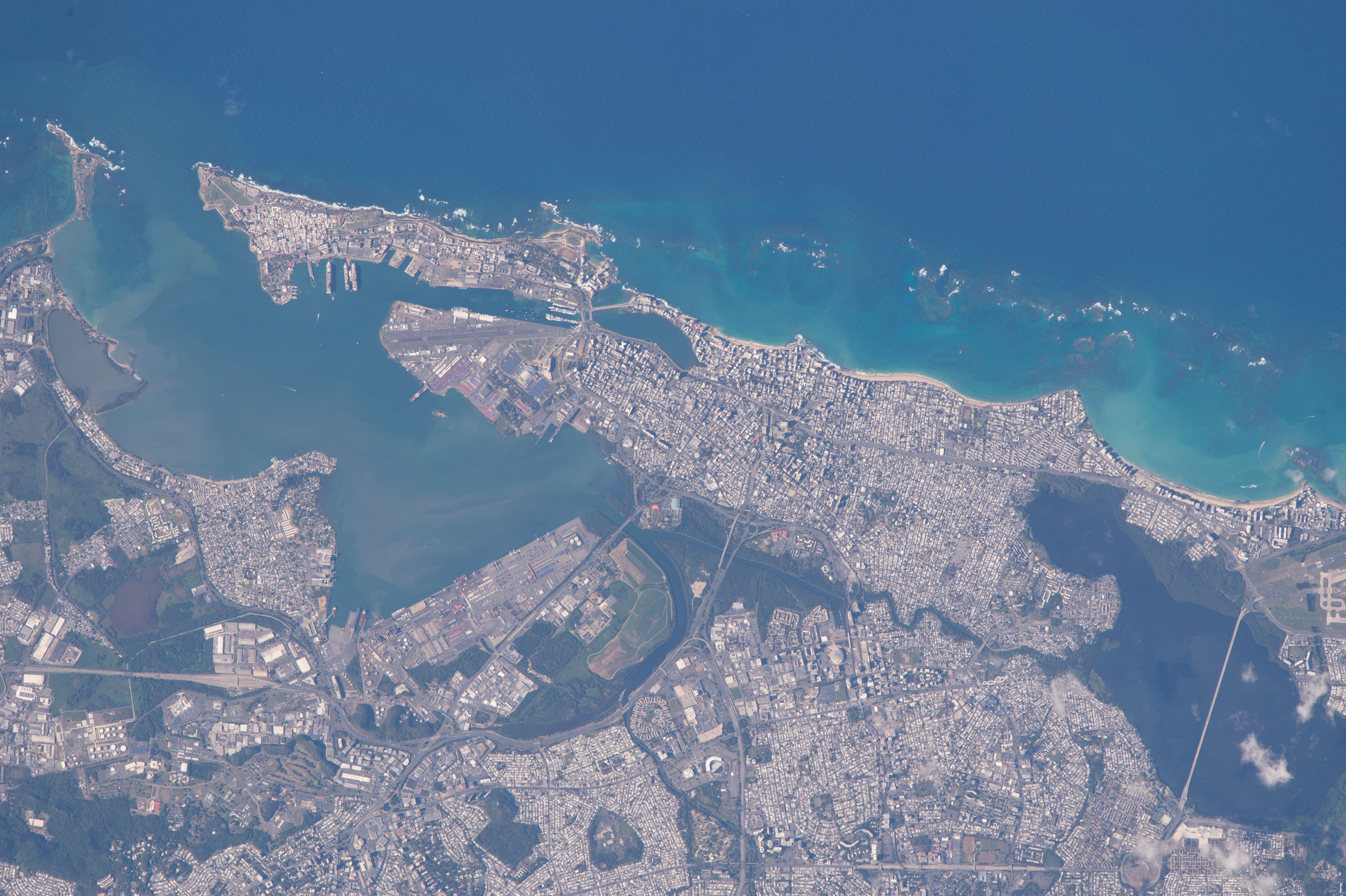
Satellite view from entrance to San Juan Bay (upper left) between Isla de Cabras in the Toa Baja municipality and Old San Juan historic quarter in San Juan Islet in the San Juan capital municipality to Isla Verde resort area (upper right) in the Carolina municipality with several lagoons and channels of the San Juan Bay Estuary visible, 2016

== San Juan Bay Estuary ==
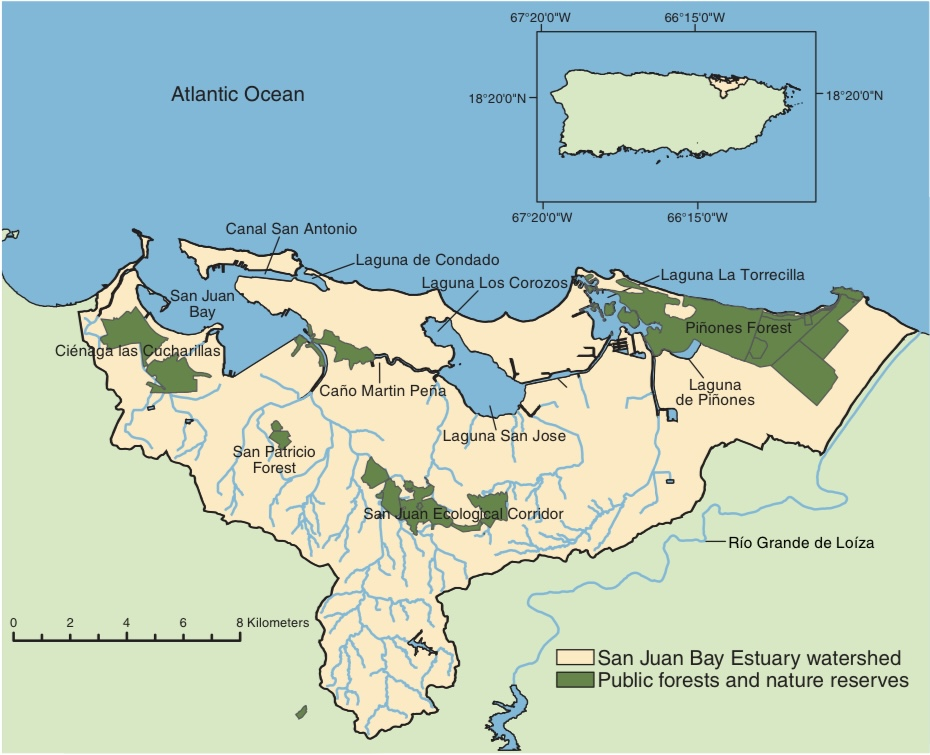
Map of San Juan Bay Estuary, encompassing San Juan Bay and several interconnected lagoons, channels, rivers, and creeks surrounded by the San Juan metropolitan area in the northeastern coastal plain of the main island, 2014

About 3.5 miles (5.6 km) in length and 0.55 to 2 miles (0.89 to 3.22 km) in width, San Juan Bay is the largest body of water of the San Juan Bay Estuary, an extensive system of mostly interconnected lagoons, channels, rivers, creeks, and inlets that includes coral reef environments, shallow open-ocean lagoons, rocky intertidal areas, dunes and beaches, sand flats, swamps and salt marshes, brackish marshes, freshwater swamps, mangroves, forested wetlands, and freshwater lagoons or ponds.

The San Juan Bay Estuary, which covers about 83 square miles (215 km^{2}) of land and 14 square miles (36 km^{2}) of water in the capital municipality of San Juan and neighboring municipalities within its metropolitan area, namely Bayamón, Guaynabo, Cataño, Toa Baja, Carolina, Trujillo Alto, and Loíza, from west to east in the northeastern coastal plain of the main island of Puerto Rico. The estuary consists principally of San Juan Bay, and the Condado, Los Corozos, San José, Torrecilla, and Piñones lagoons. These are interconnected by the Aguas Frías, La Malaria, San Fernando, San Antonio, Margarita, Martín Peña, Suárez, Blasina, and Piñones channels. The estuary is fed by fresh water from the Puerto Nuevo and Piedras rivers, and several creeks, including the Juan Méndez, San Anton, and Blasina creeks. In addition to the mouth of San Juan Bay, the estuary is directly connected to the North Atlantic Ocean by the El Boquerón and Boca de Cangrejos inlets.

Hydraulically, the San Juan Bay Estuary is a complex system dominated by the ebb and flow of seawater controlled by the tides in the area. There are significant differences in salinity between the bodies of water that make up the estuary, as well as variations in time and space. San José and Torrecilla lagoons exhibit the highest salinity concentrations and variations due to multiple indirect connections to the ocean and urban runoff discharges. Also, due to previous dredging, pockets of seawater remain in San José lagoon in areas where excavations impede water circulation and mixing. By comparison, salinity in San Juan Bay is similar to that found in the open ocean (35 parts per thousand, ppt). Near the mouth of Martín Peña Channel in San Juan Bay, salinity decreases in response to freshwater discharges from the Puerto Nuevo and Piedras rivers. In this channel, freshwater predominates at the channel surface, floating over higher-density saline water, a highly contaminated mixture with sewage discharges.

As a result of the increased urban and commercial expansion, and acelebrated environmental stress on the region, the estuary has been the focus of restoration ecology projects. In 2015, the San Juan Estuary Program began using green flags to mark the condition of the waters of the estuary.

== History ==
=== Spanish conquest and settlement ===
The Spanish conquistadors of the New World thought in terms of urban landscapes and municipal organization. They did not launch their colonization of the Americas from ocean-going caravels or itinerant campsites. The Spanish needed solid dwellings, preferably surrounded by rock walls, as they had in Europe. Juan Ponce de León spent days searching for the best place to build a settlement, the blueprint for a colonial city. Santo Domingo governor Nicolás de Ovando had appointed him to pacify and evangelize the nearby island, which Christopher Columbus had named San Juan Bautista after John the Baptist during his second voyage to the Americas. A frontier with dreaded, cannibalistic natives known as the Caribs on its coast, it was an opportunity to demonstrate machismo and glorify God and country. Following de Ovando's recommendation, Ferdinand II of Aragon made Ponce de León an adelantado and authorized him to conquer the main island of Puerto Rico, which was inhabited by the indigenous Taíno people. Boriquén, the native name of the island, would be the second Caribbean island to become part of the Spanish Empire.

In 1508, Ponce de León sailed into the Bay of Guanica, on the southwestern corner of the island, where local cacique Agüeybaná I welcomed his men as allies against the Caribs. However, the Spanish did not find a suitable place to settle there. The adelantado and his small team of hidalgos traversed the unexplored northern coast of the island until they saw a spacious, almost-landlocked bay on the northeastern shore. No indigenous peoples seemed to claim the area, since it was subject to Carib raids. Ponce de León reportedly named the body of water the Bay of the Rich Port (Spanish: Bahía de Puerto Rico).

Ponce de León pushed inland and founded the first Spanish settlement on the island, about 1.5 miles (2.4 km) from the bay in the area that today occupies the Villa Caparra suburbs in the Pueblo Viejo barrio of the Guaynabo municipality. Following de Ovando's suggestion, he named the settlement Caparra after the ancient Roman city of Cáparra in Cáceres, the Spanish province where Ovando was born. However, King Ferdinand II of Aragon referred to the village as Ciudad de Puerto Rico (City of Rich Port). The explorer chose the site because of its proximity to the sea and "to the gold mines and farms of the Toa Valley".

Caparra proved to be an inauspicious venture. Mendicant friars appealed to Governor Ponce de León to move the settlement closer to the bay (and its sea breezes), saying that its present location was lethal to children. The governor was adamantly opposed, since he had had a house built in Caparra. In 1511, the Spanish Crown appointed a new governor, Juan Cerón, who received royal permission to relocate the village.

The villagers resettled on a 3-mile (4.8 km) blustery, wooded islet, today San Juan Islet in the capital municipality of San Juan, at the entrance to the bay. In 1521, the residents completed the resettlement and named the new settlement San Juan Bautista de Puerto Rico (Saint John Baptist of Rich Port), but was often commonly referred to Ciudad de Puerto Rico (City of Rich Port). Colonial engineers fortified the islet with masonry walls, today the Walls of Old San Juan, and fortresses, like the El Morro and San Cristóbal castles, connecting it to mainland Puerto Rico with a fort and bridge known named San Antonio, today Puente Guillermo Esteves. The city came to be known as "the walled city".

Sixteenth-century Spanish historian and indigenous activist Bartolomé de las Casas described the bay and its surrounding area names different from those presently used: La isla que llamamos de San Juan, que por vocablo de la lengua de los indios, vecinos naturales della, se nombraba Boriquén ... tiene algunos puertos no buenos, si no es el que llaman Puerto-Rico ("That island we call San Juan, which according to the native Indian language was called Boriquén, has but a few inferior harbors, except the one called Puerto-Rico"). According to de las Casas, the Indians called their island "Boriquén"; the Spanish called it "San Juan", and its harbor "Puerto Rico". Over time, the island became Puerto Rico and its harbor (and bay) San Juan; the Indian name changed to Borinquen, with no diacritic and an extra n.

=== Colonial period ===
Although the Atlantic winds may have provided a healthier climate on San Juan Islet, moving the settlement from inland to the entrance of San Juan Bay did not protect the settlers further from Carib attacks. The Caribs, understanding the impact of European colonization on their survival, stormed the new settlement fiercely.

By the eighteenth century, the population of the islet had expanded into the modern City of San Juan, largely due to the proximity of the bay and its port. The city and the bay's entrances were fortified; the bay and its walls isolated the Spanish inhabitants from the rest of the main island's population, encouraging a casta.

For the last 500 years, the bay's most important function has been to link Puerto Rico and the outside world, and detachments of the Spanish treasure fleet connected the island colony to the Spanish colonial network. With its strategic location, it was a target for pirate attacks and a site for imperial great powers to demonstrate military might. On the east side of the bay's mouth, the Castillo San Felipe del Morro still guards its narrow entrance.

=== Present day ===
The Port of San Juan is among the busiest Caribbean ports. Thousands of fishermen ply the brackish waters where fresh water meets the sea. San Juan Bay's beauty and ecological diversity attracts tourism and a variety of recreational activities.

A result of exploitation, however, has been the degradation of a significant portion of the bay's natural resources; the area is also susceptible to seismic activity. A restoration project has returned the bay's water to "safe at contact" status and has integrated the city's renovated coastal infrastructure into the bay's shoreline.

== Historical maps ==
The following list includes historical sketches and maps of San Juan Bay and the colonial capital city of San Juan Baustista de Puerto Rico, today the Old San Juan historic quarter in San Juan Islet in San Juan, the capital municipality of the archipelago and island:

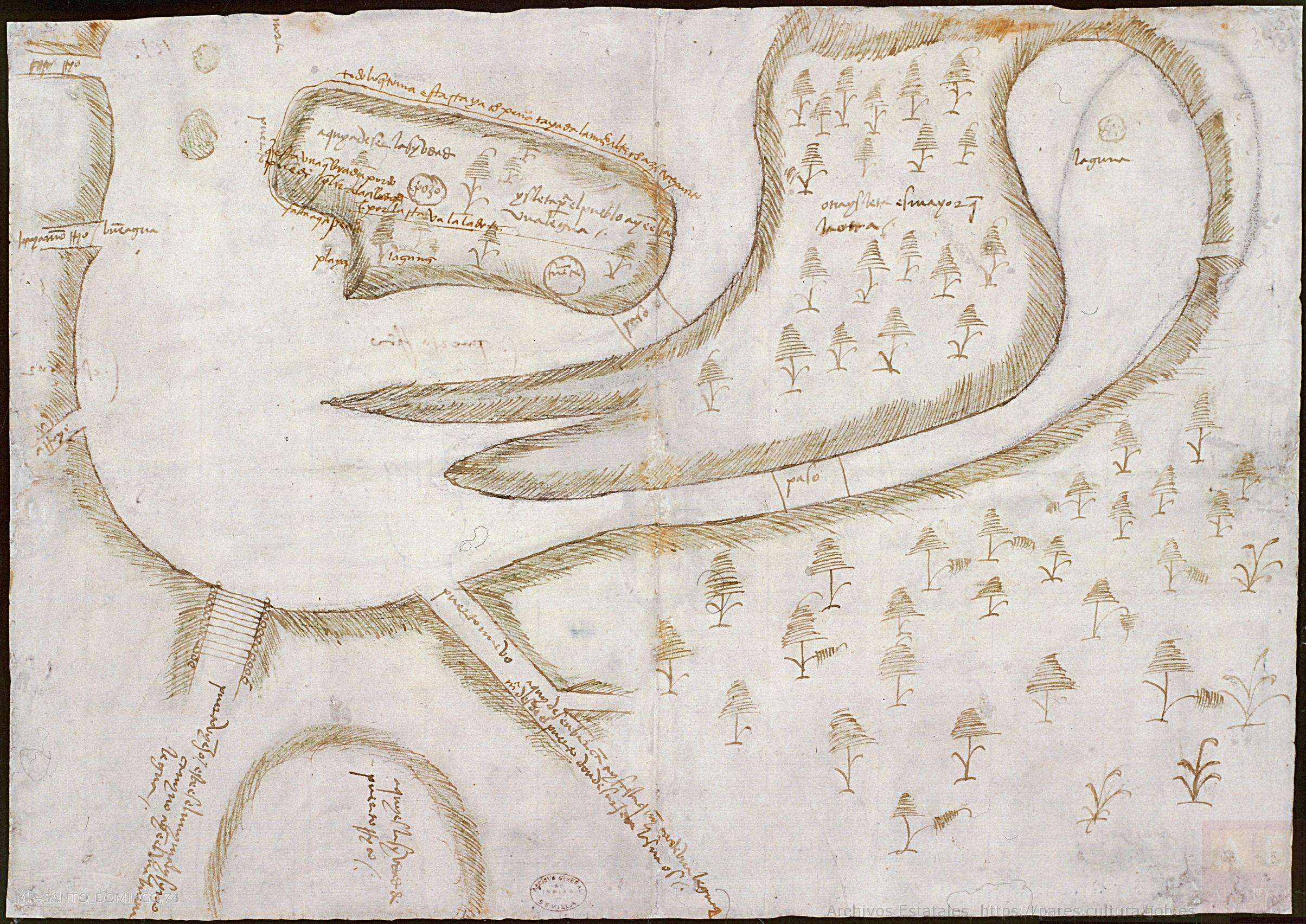
Rodrigo de Figueroa, 1519. It marks the original village of Caparra or city of Puerto Rico (circle in lower left), and the new city of San Juan Bautista de Puerto Rico, today Old San Juan (islet in upper center).

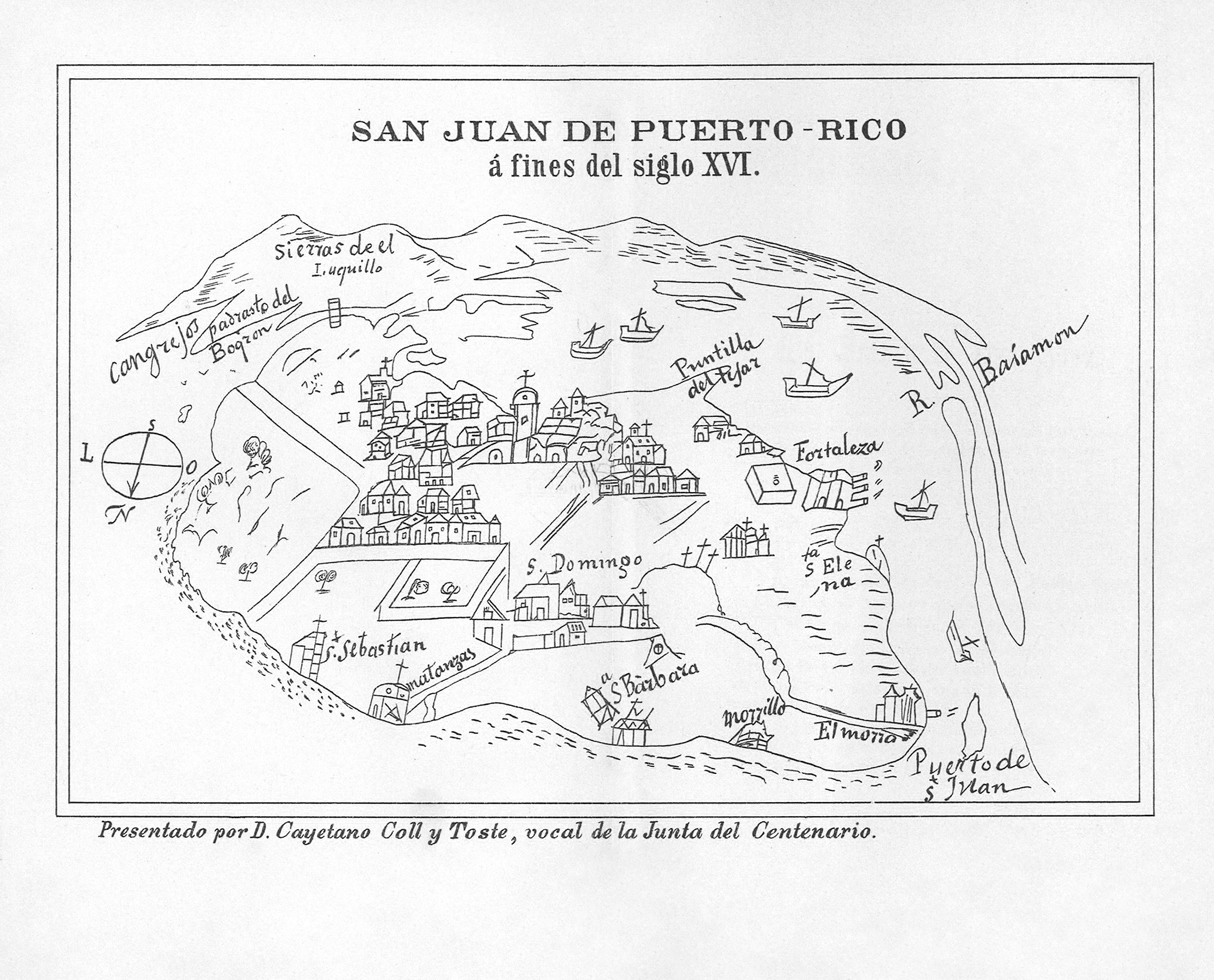
Juan Escalante de Mendoza, 1575 (inverted)

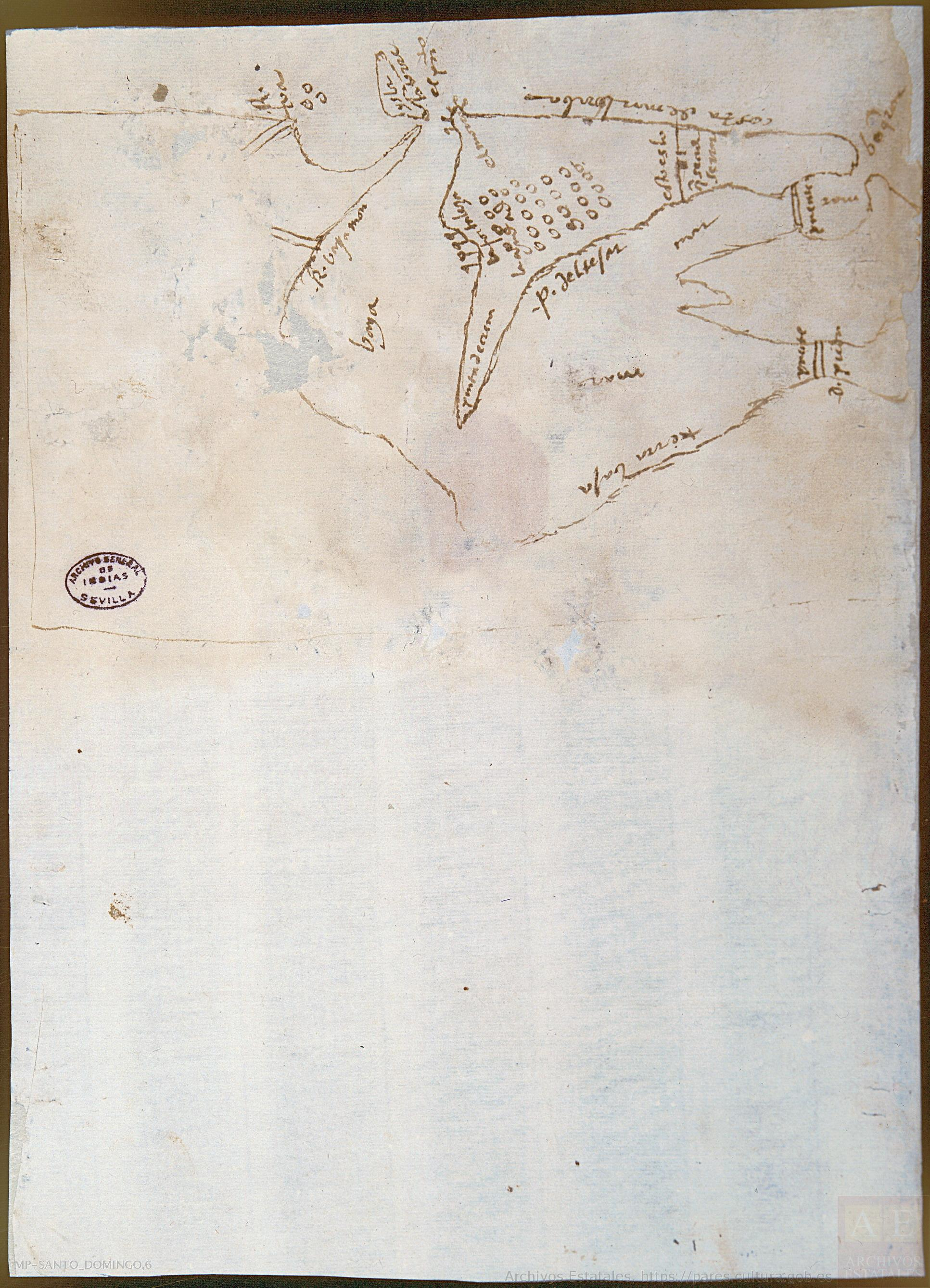
Unknown, 1579

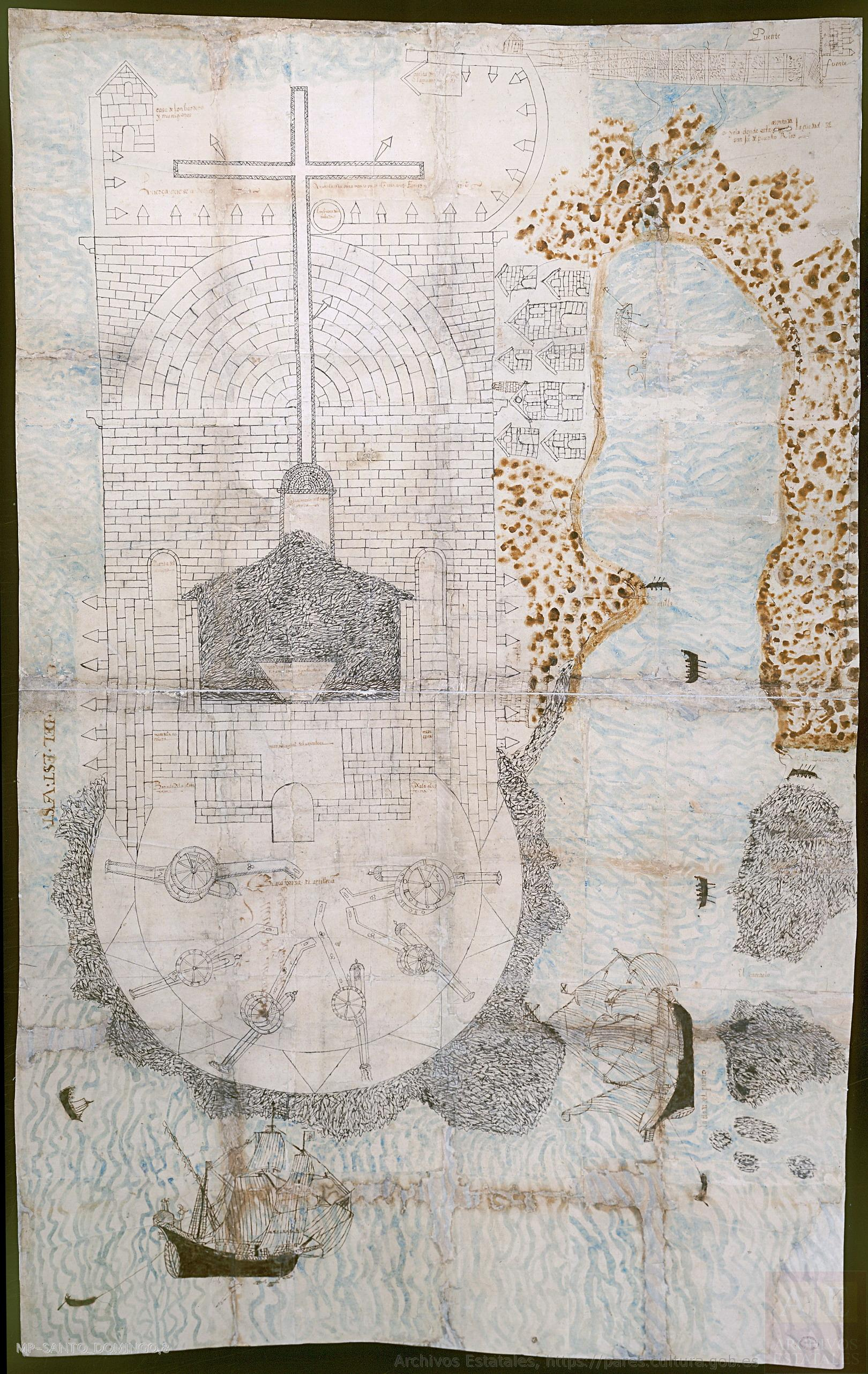
Unknown, c. 1582

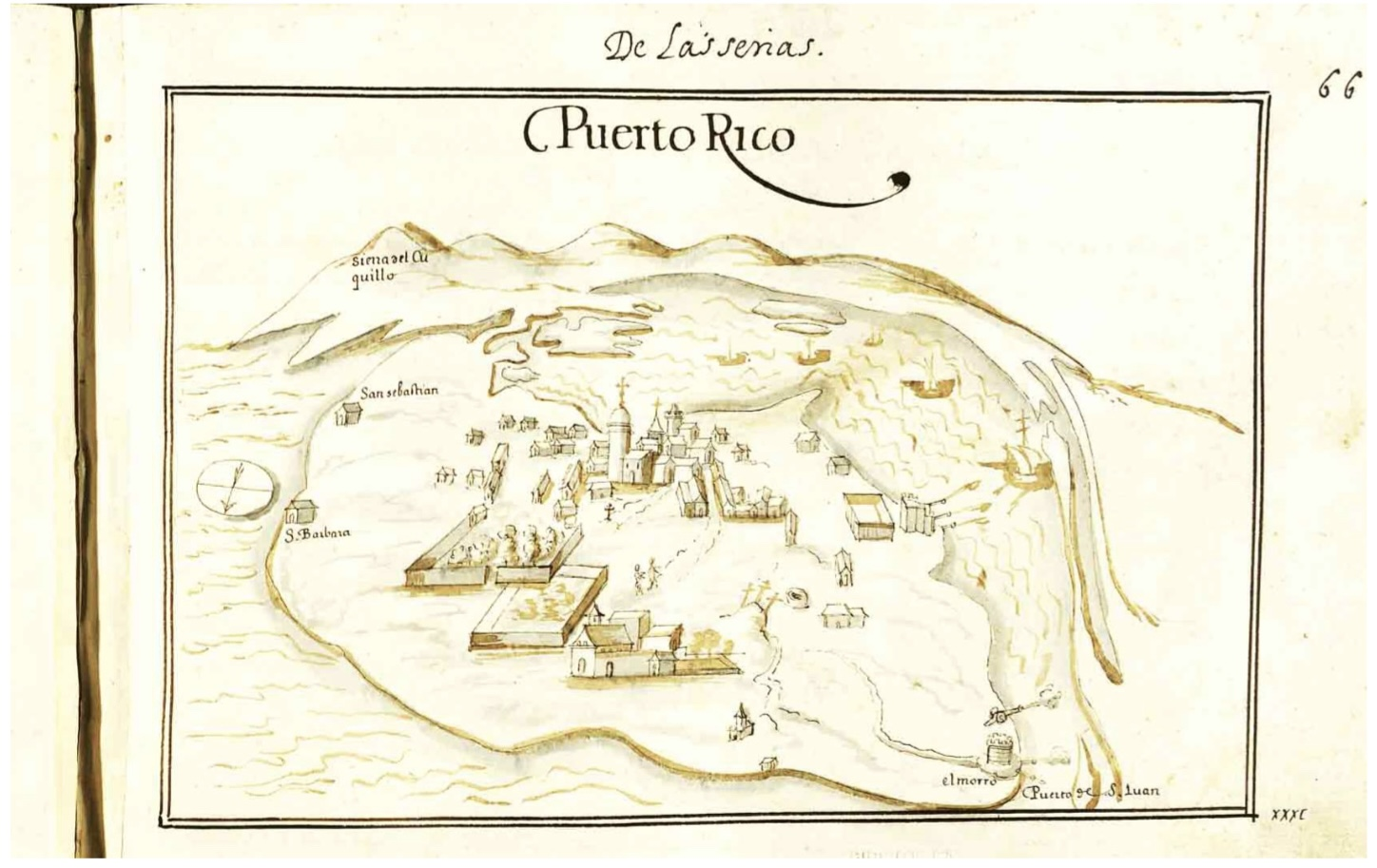
Baltasar Vellerino de Villalobos, 1592 (inverted)

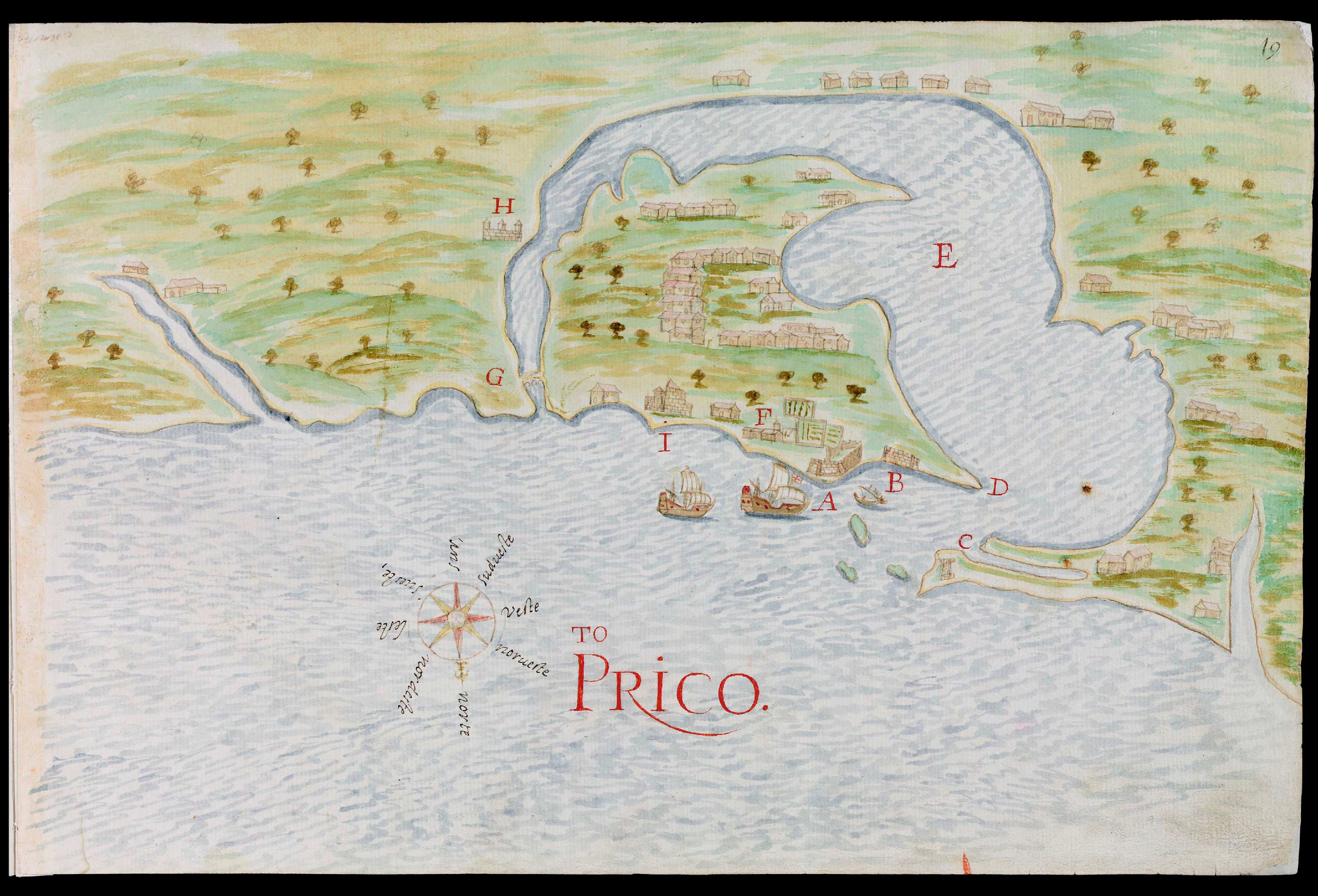
Nicolás de Cardona, 1632 (inverted)

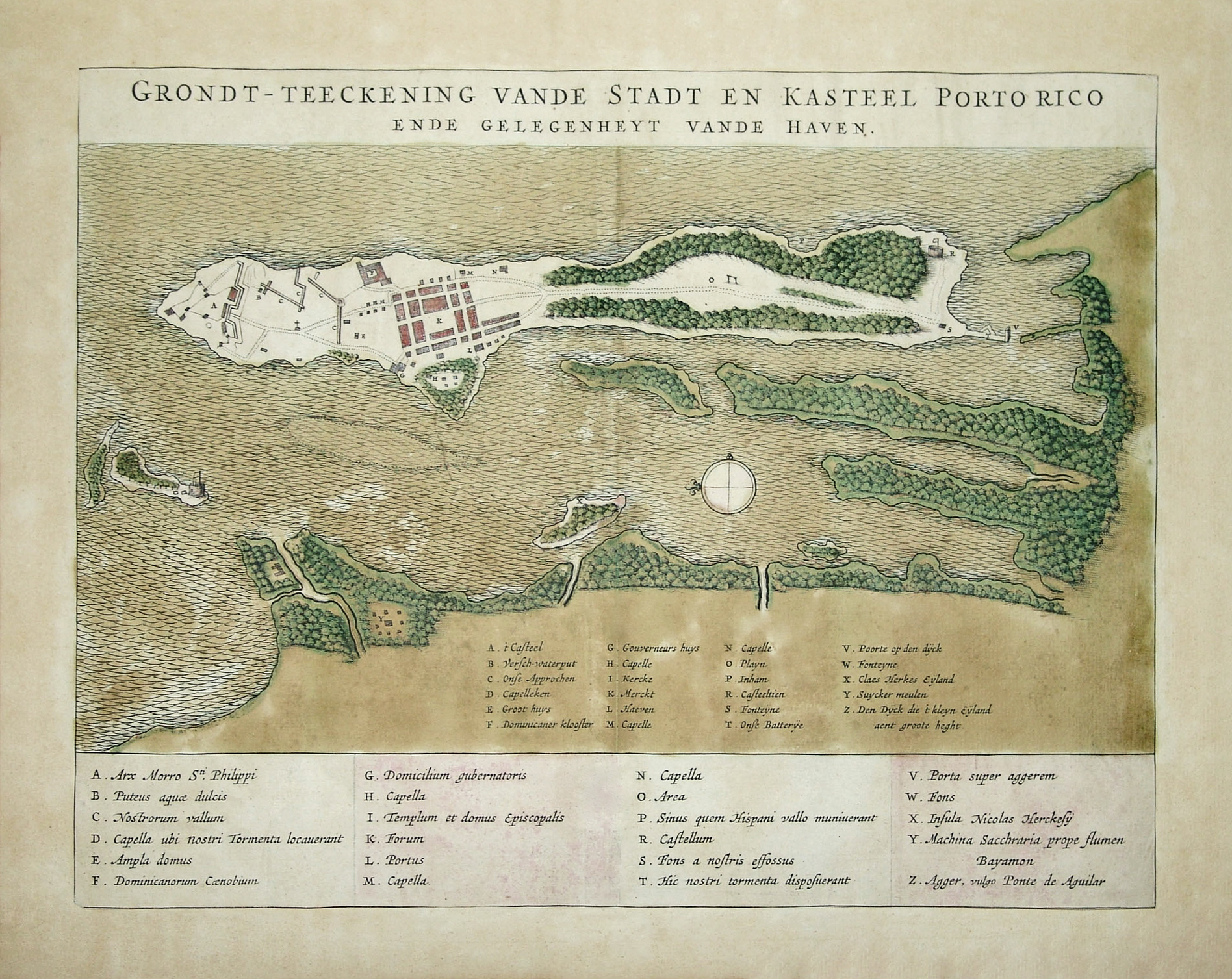
Joannes de Laet, 1644

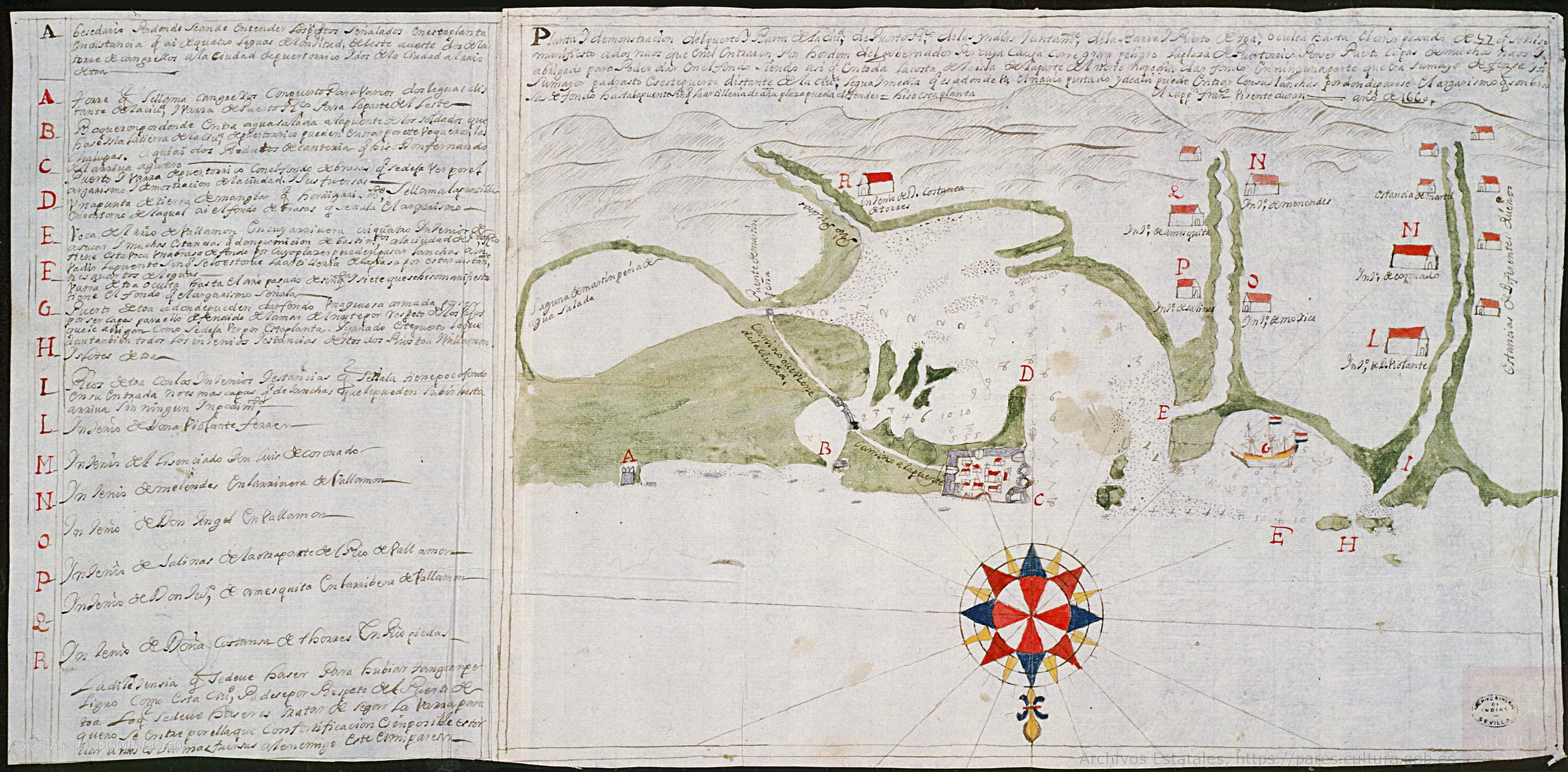
Francisco Vicente Durán, 1660 (inverted)

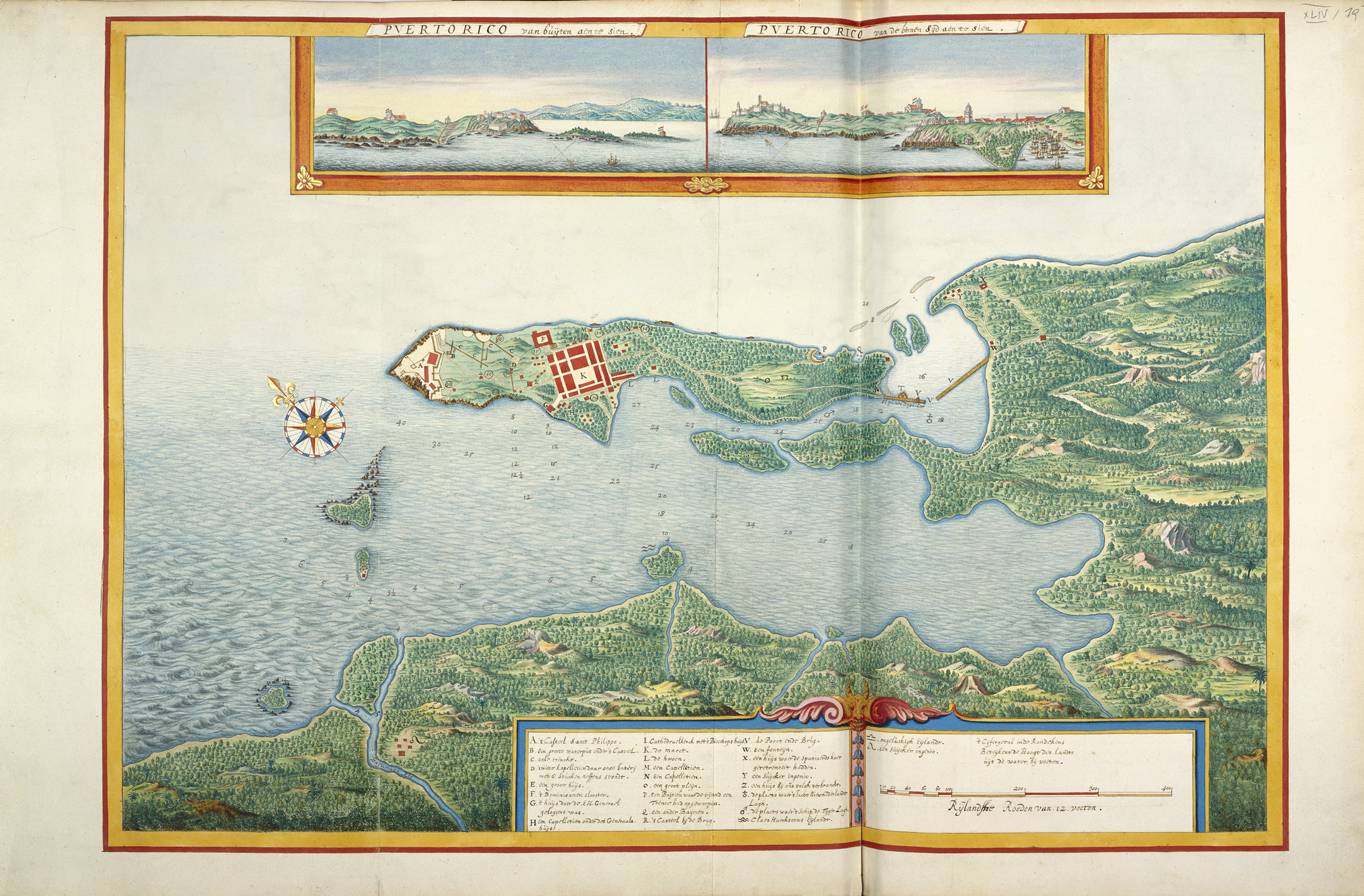
Joan Blaeu and Laurens van der Hem, c. 1660

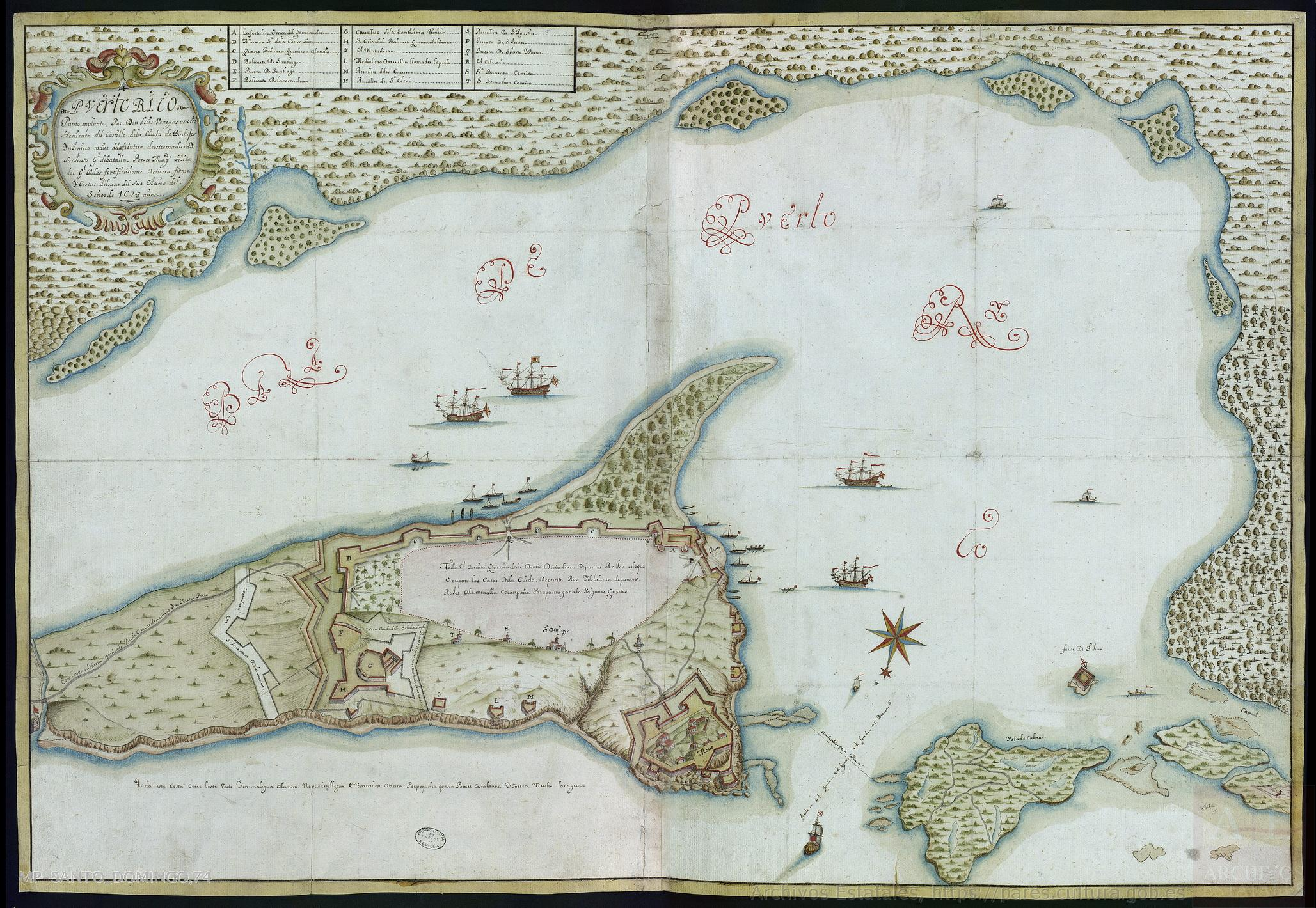
Luis Venegas Osorio, 1678 (inverted)

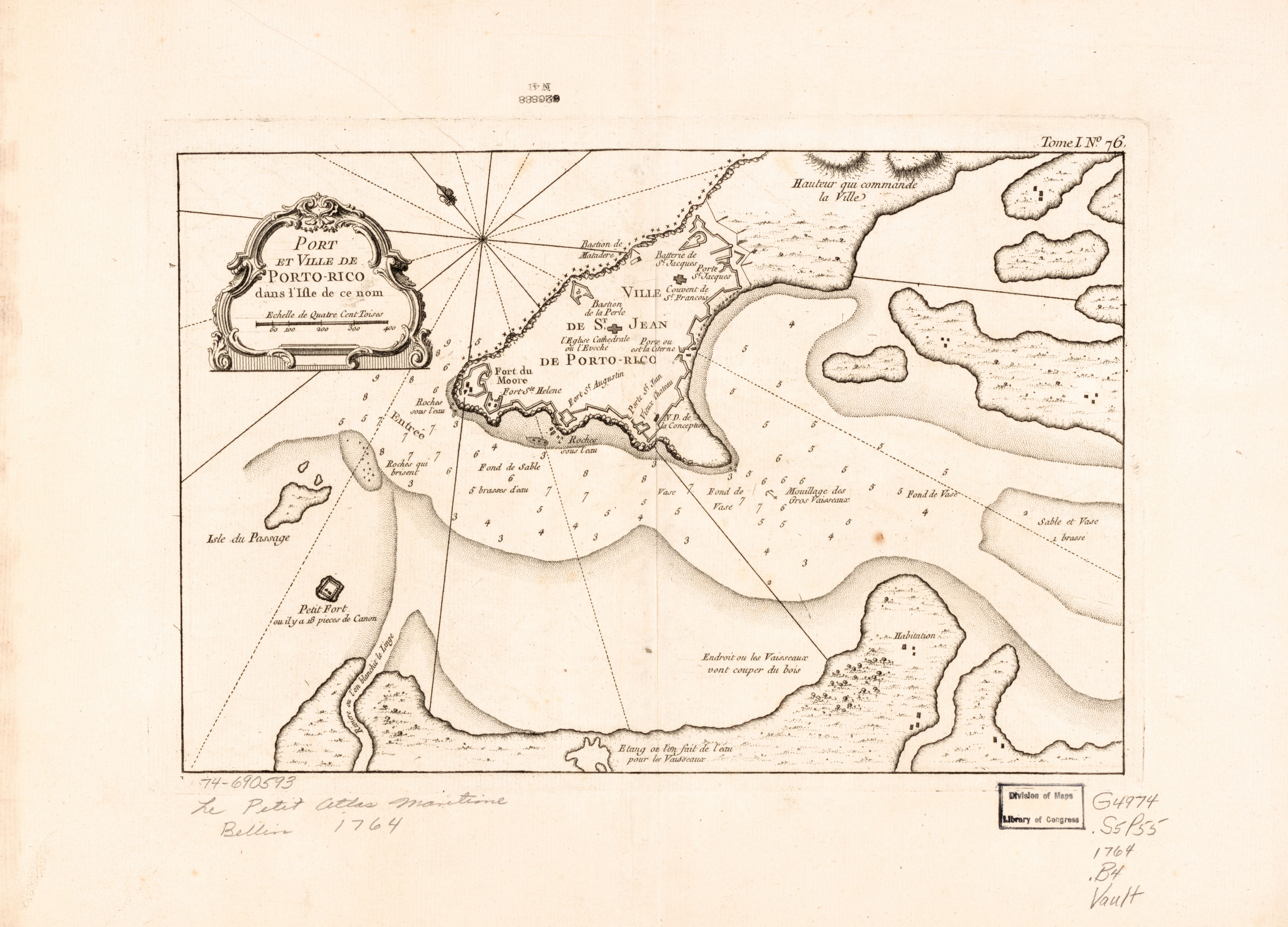
Jacques-Nicolas Bellin, 1764

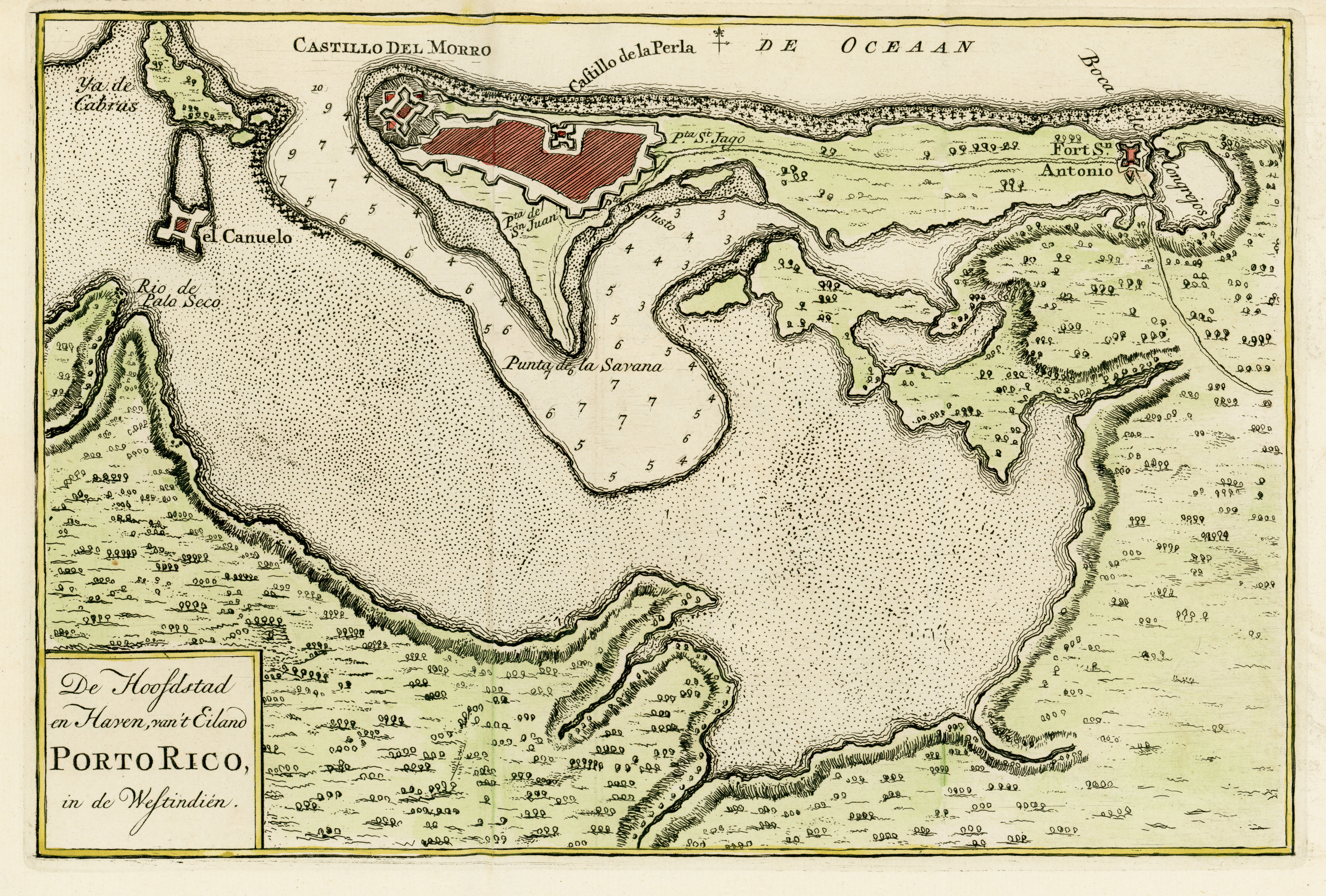
Isaak Tirion, 1769

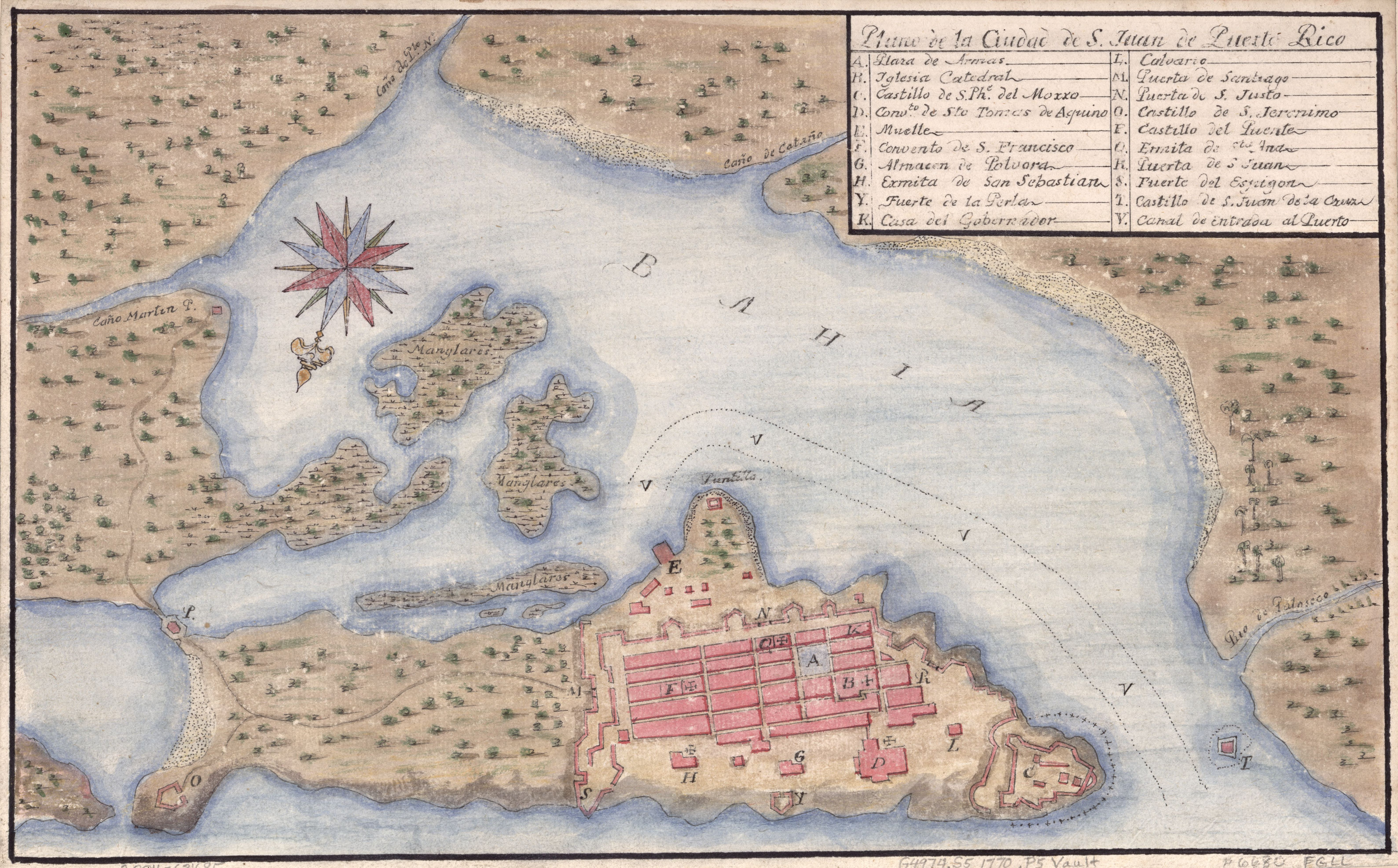
Unknown author, 1770 (inverted)

Thomas O’Daly, 1776 (inverted)

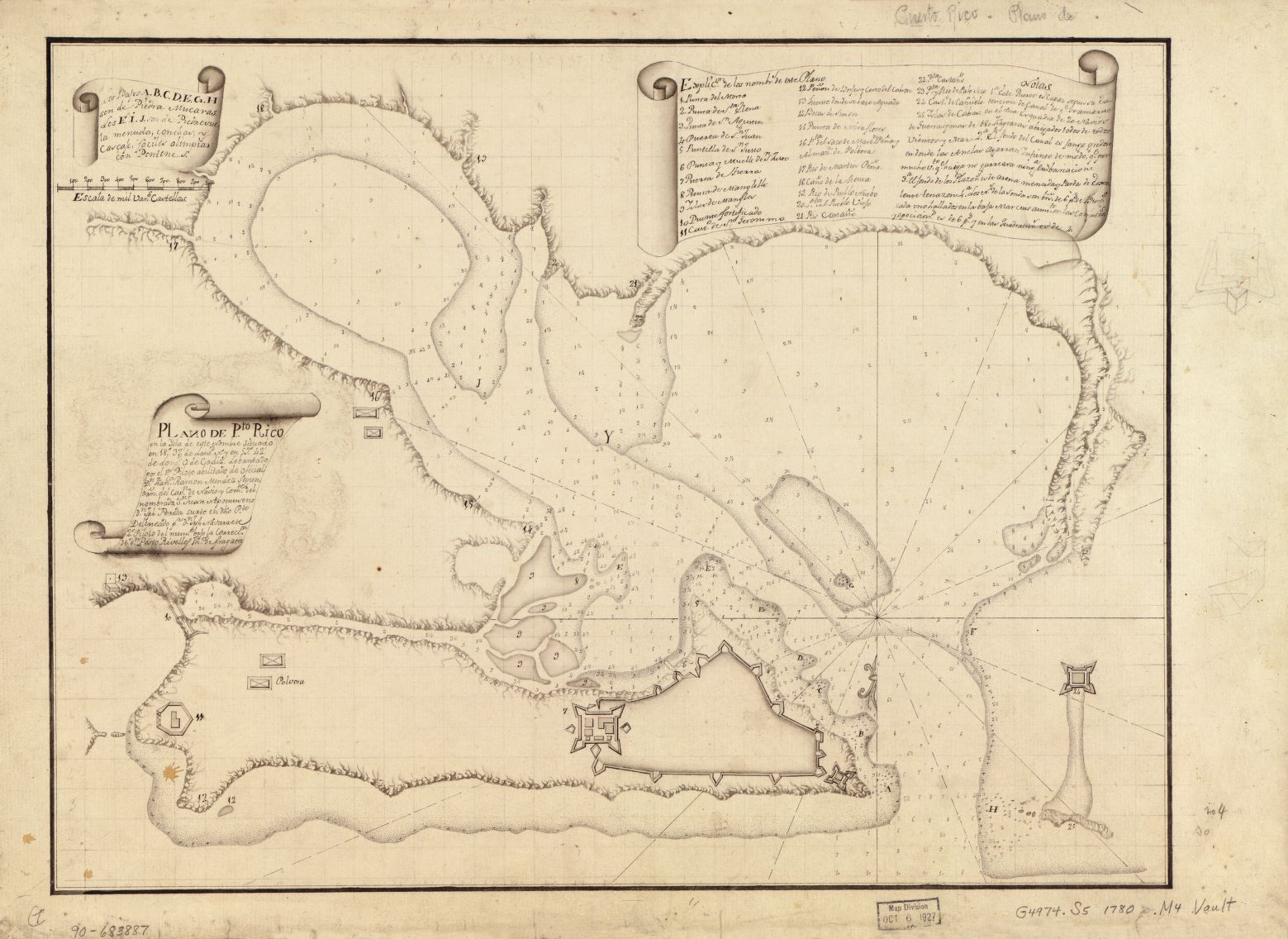
Francisco Ramón Méndez and Joseph Navarrete, c. 1780 (inverted)

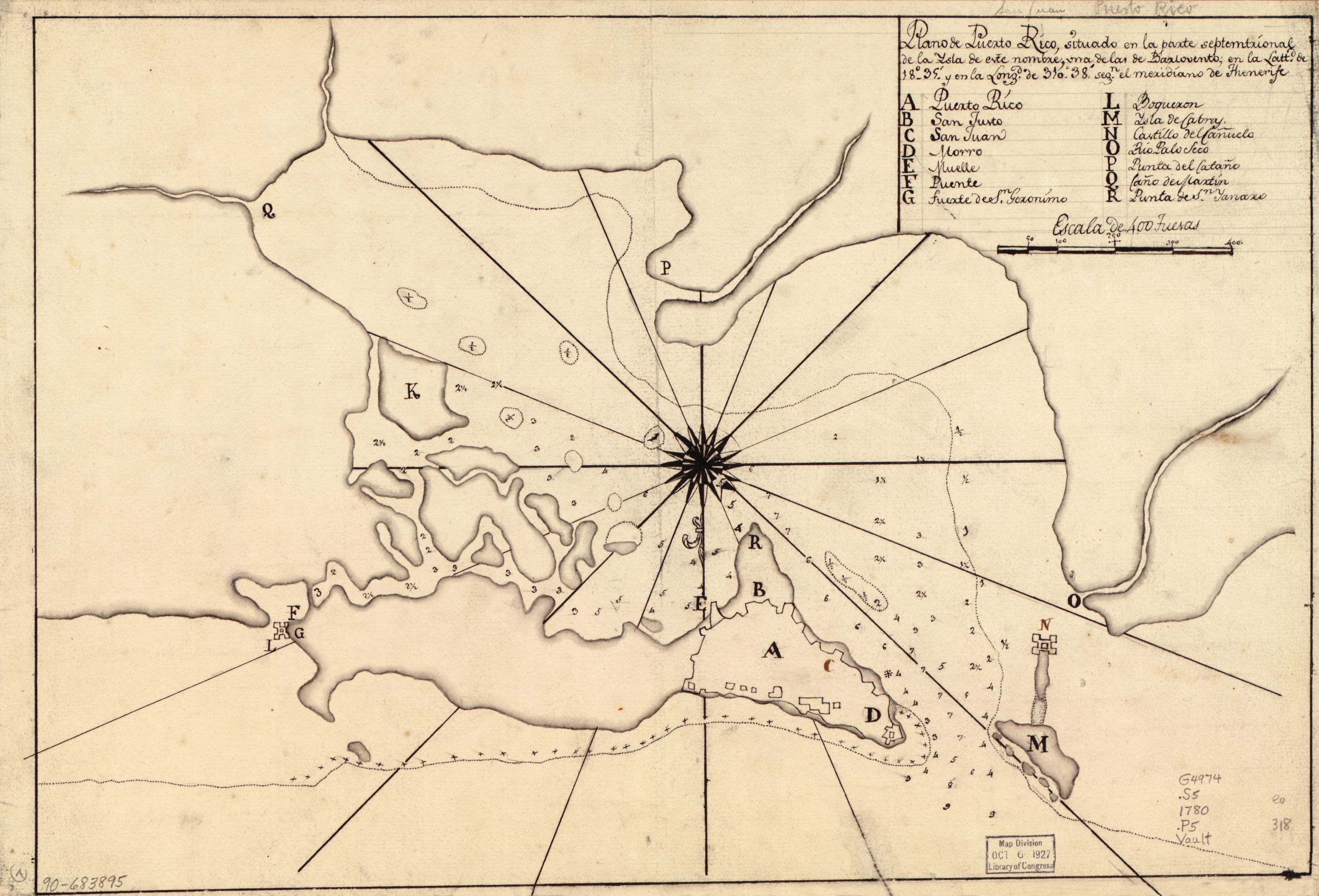
Unknown author, 1780 (inverted)

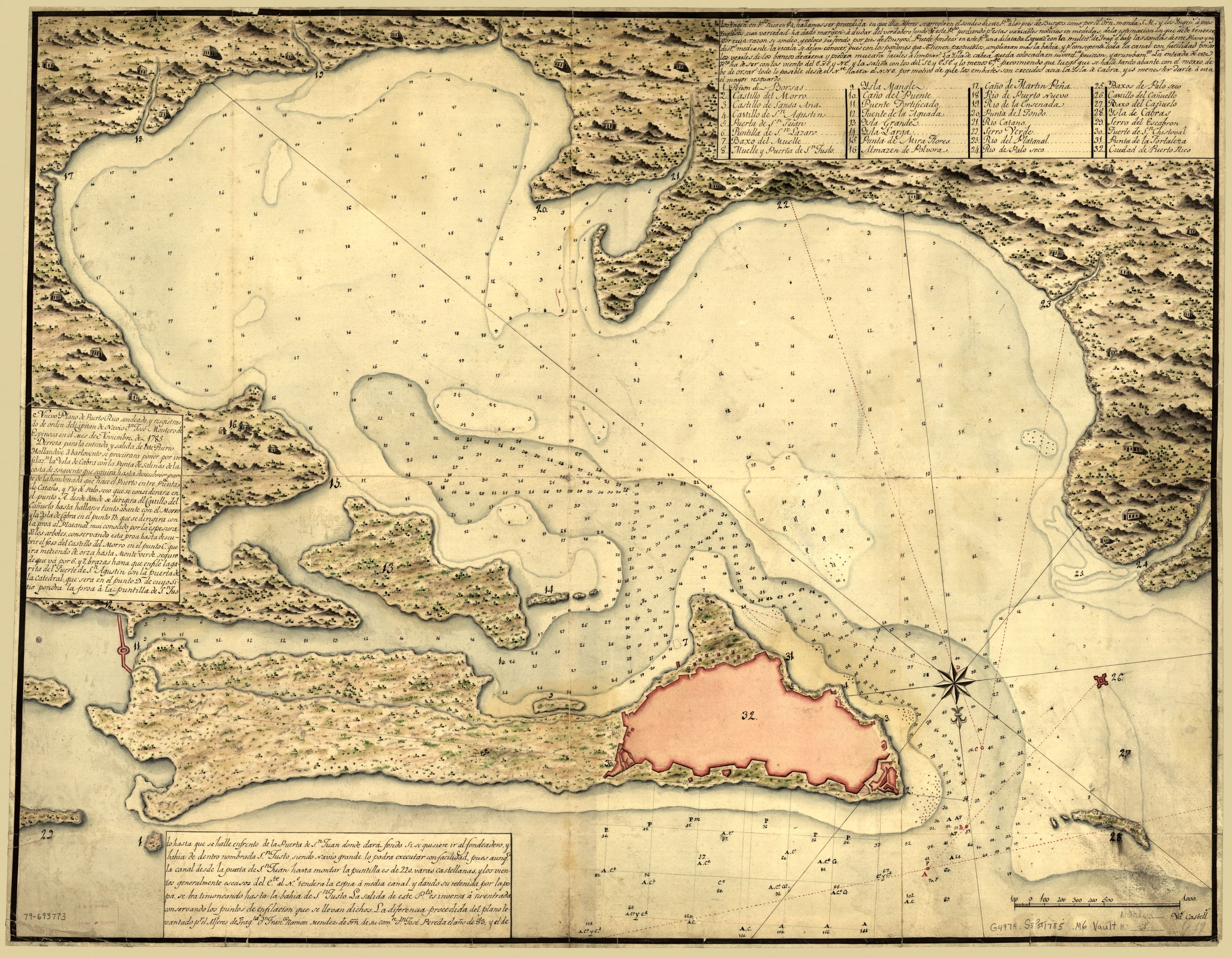
José Montero de Espinoza, 1785 (inverted)

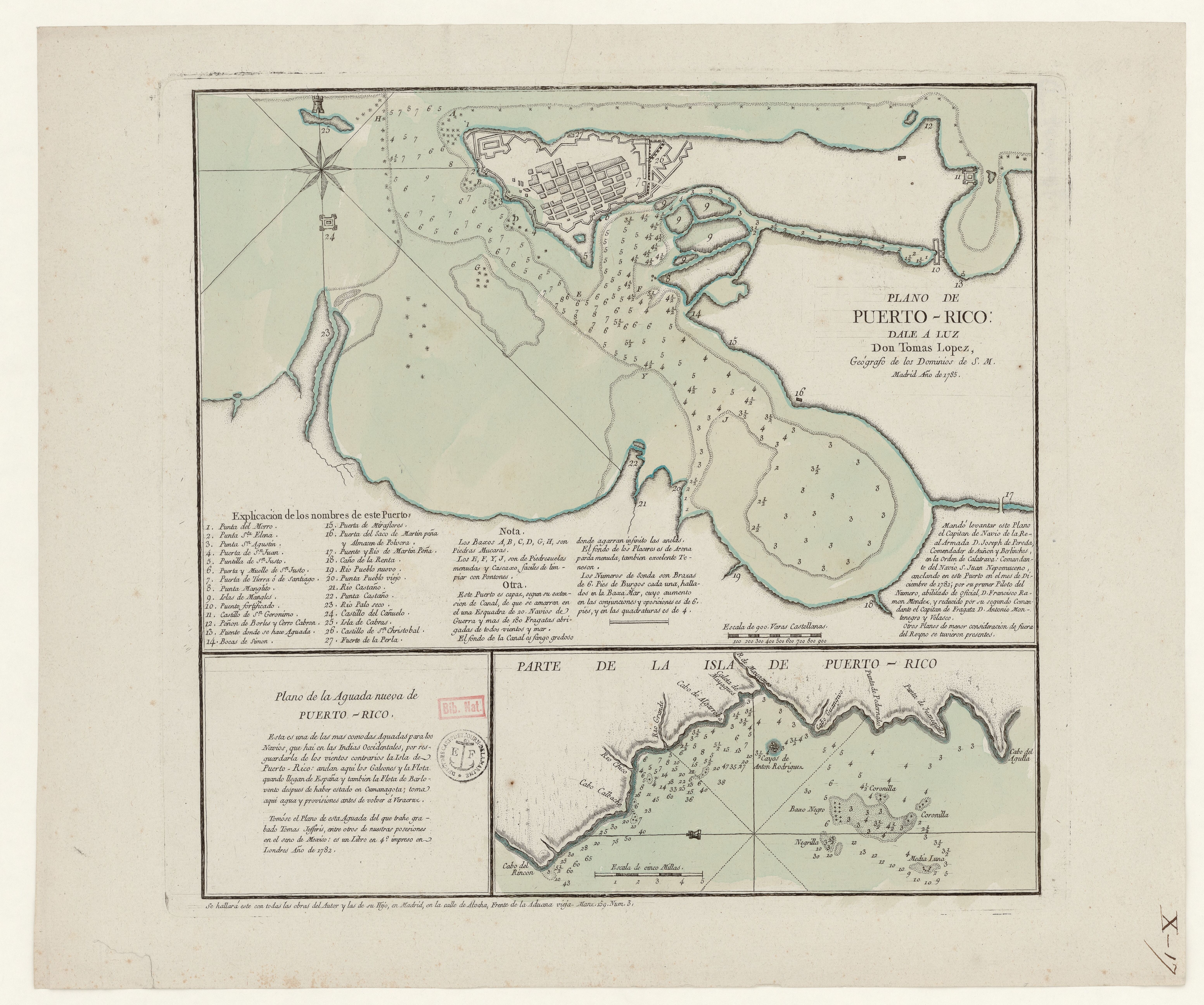
Tomás López, 1785

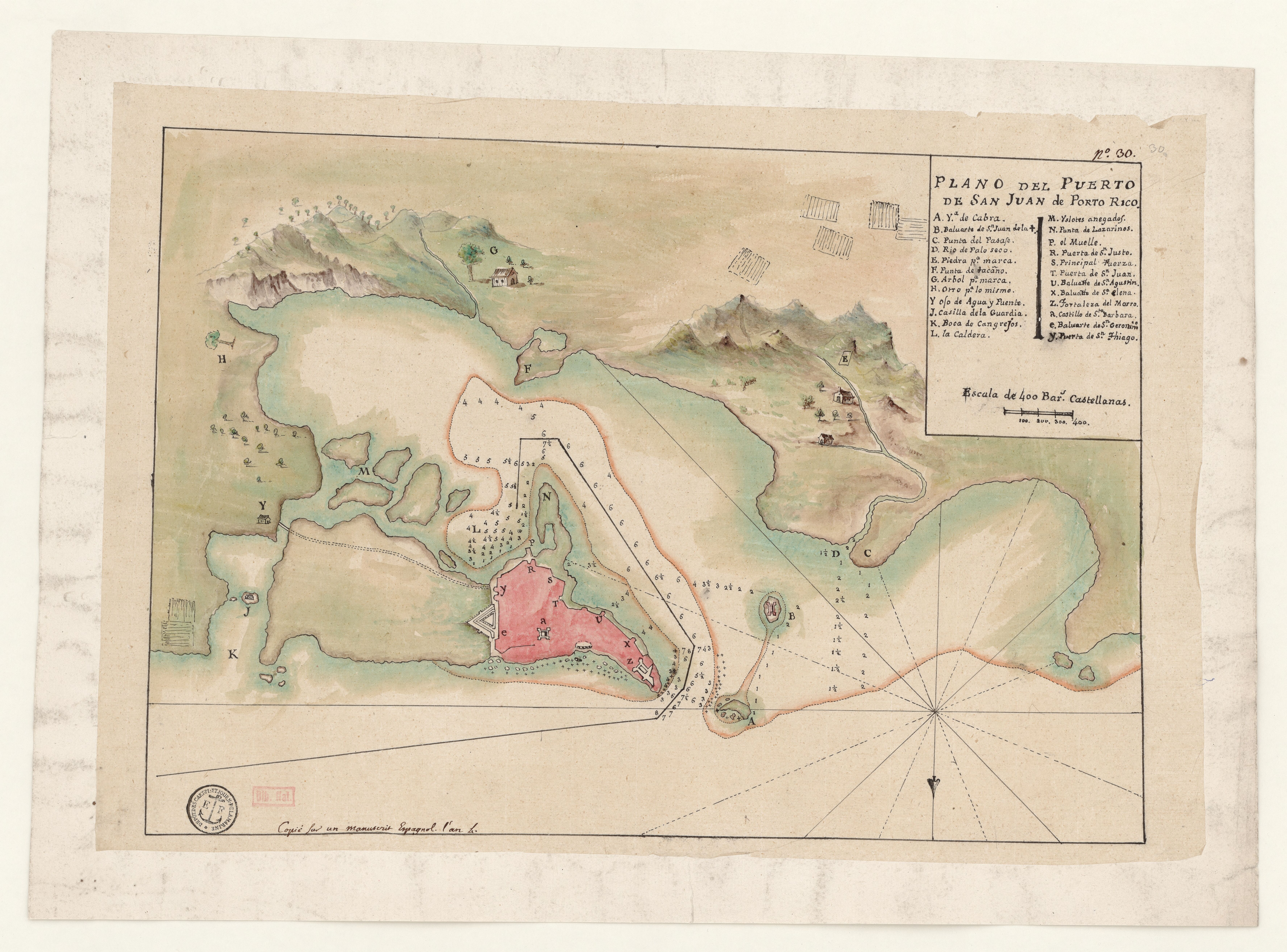
Unknown author, 1795 (inverted)

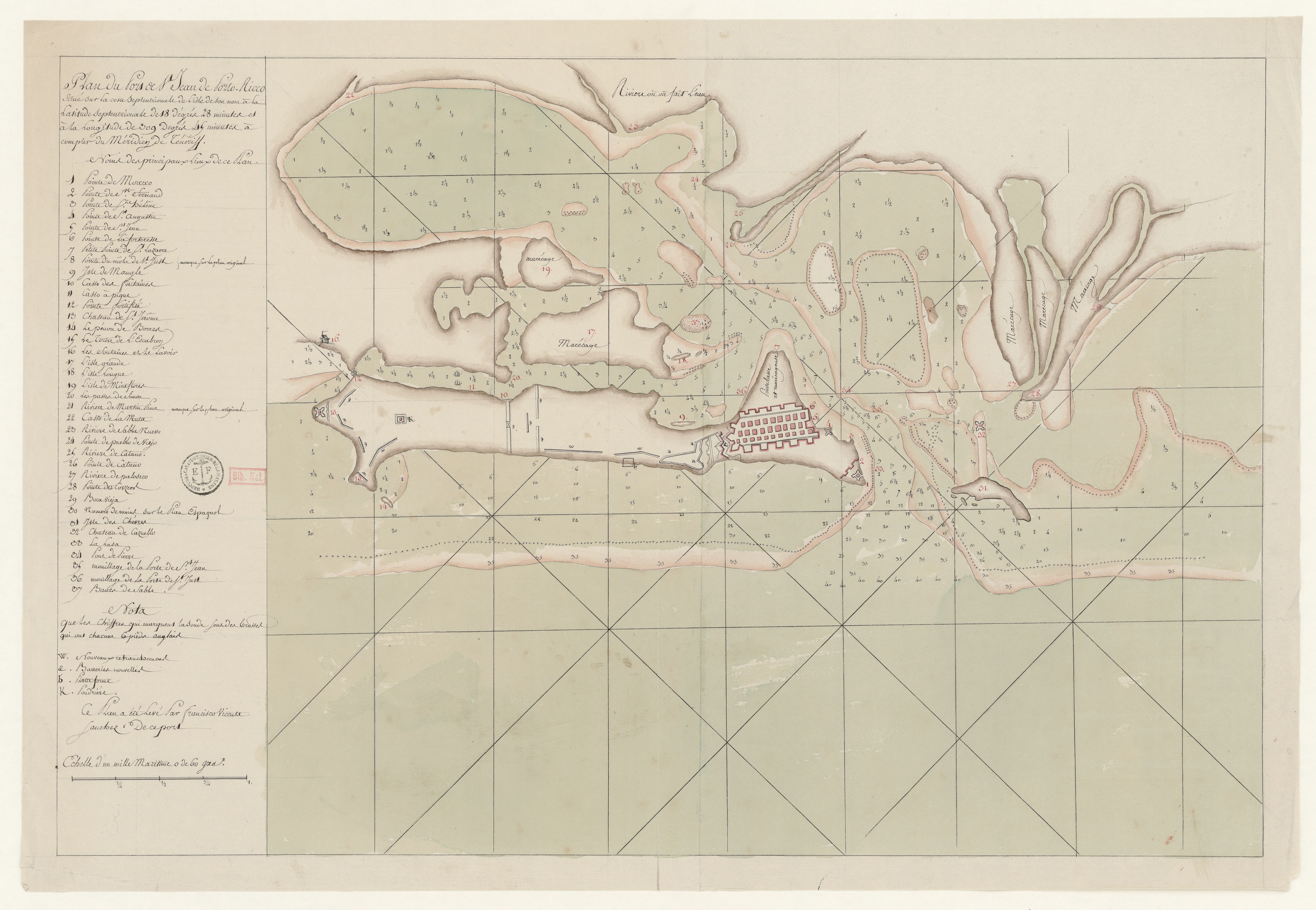
Francisco Vicente Sanchez, c. 1800 (inverted)

Unknown author, c. 1800 (inverted)

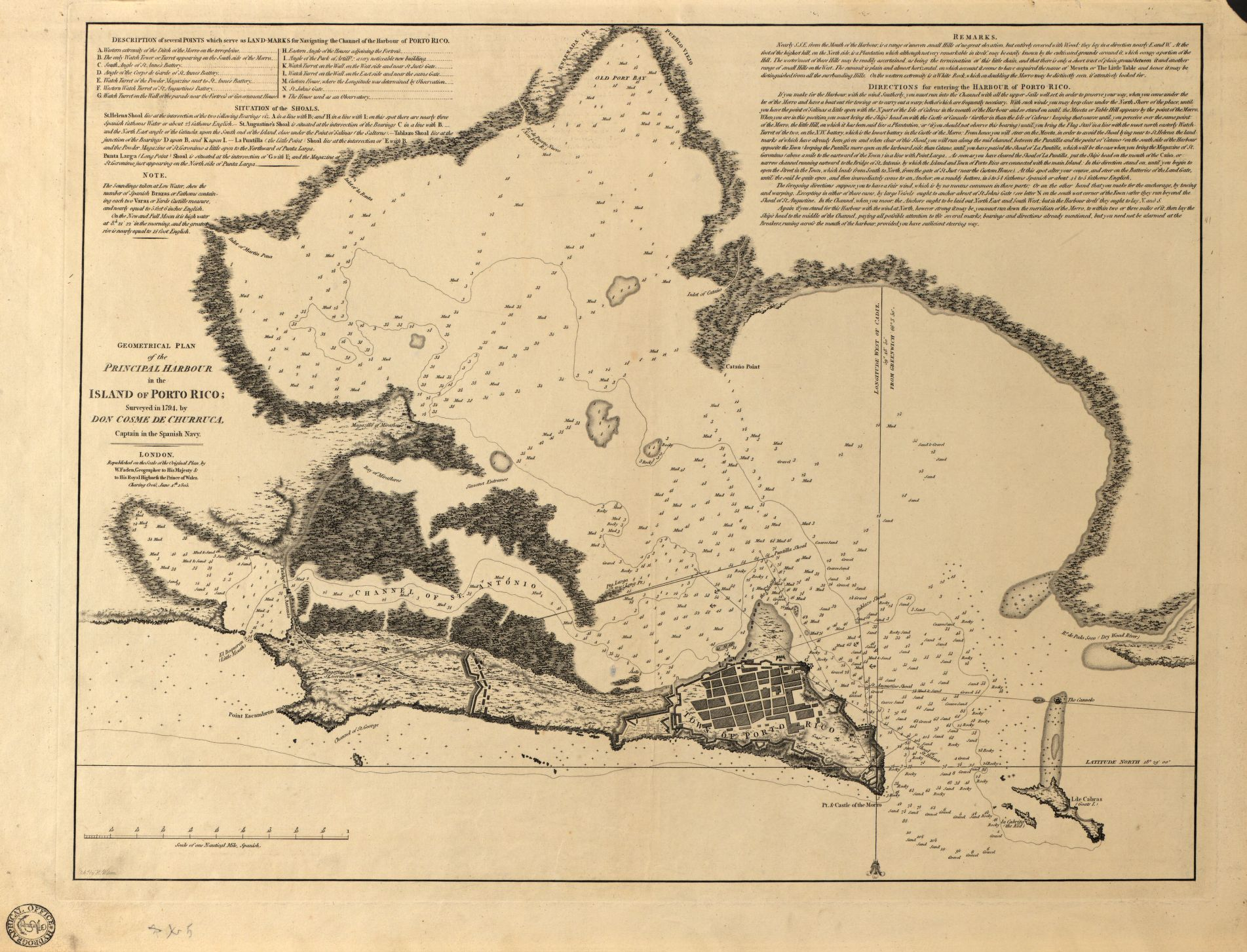
William Faden, 1805 (inverted)

United States Hydrographic Office, 1874

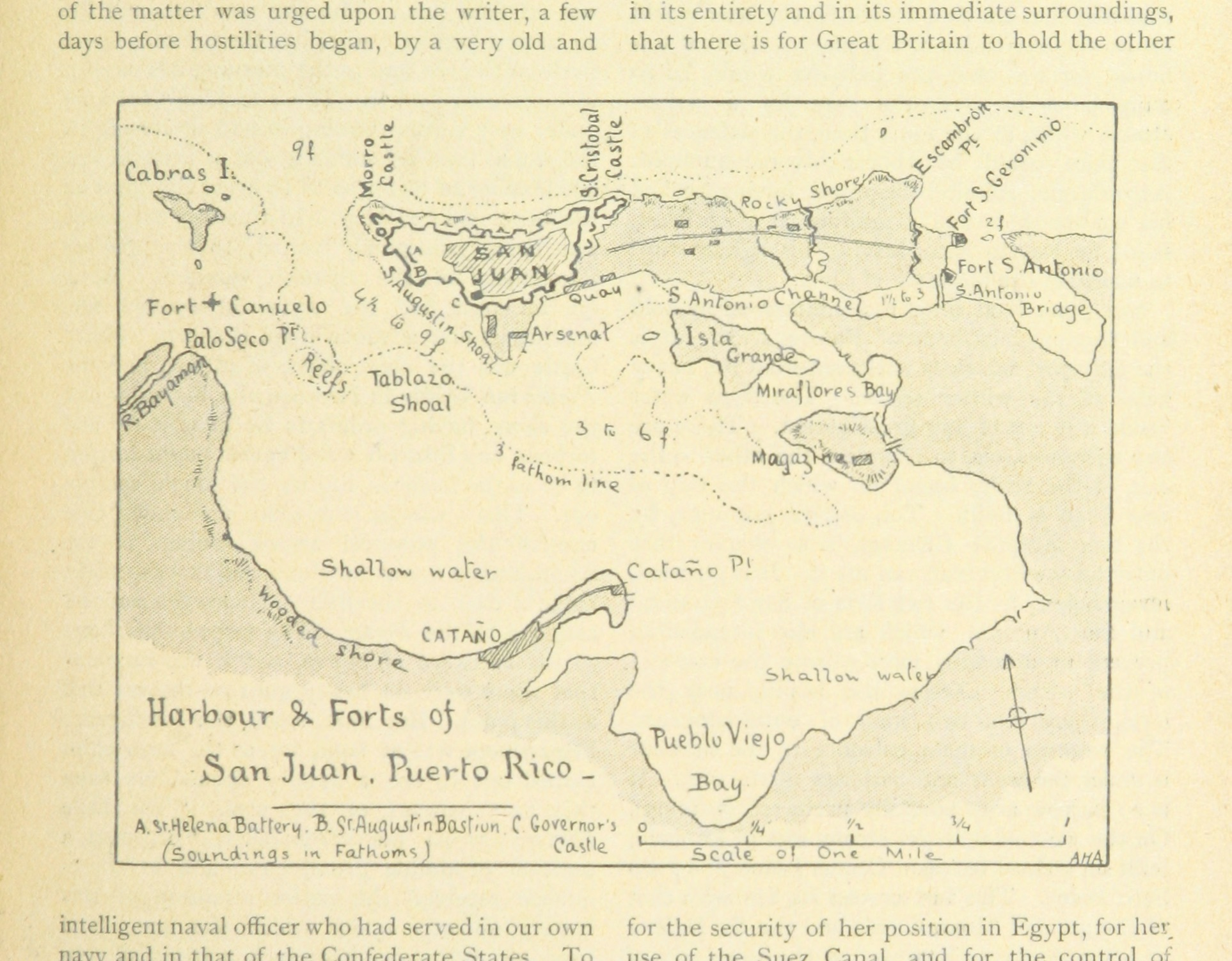
Andrew Hilliard Atteridge, 1899

United States Coast and Geodetic Survey, 1911

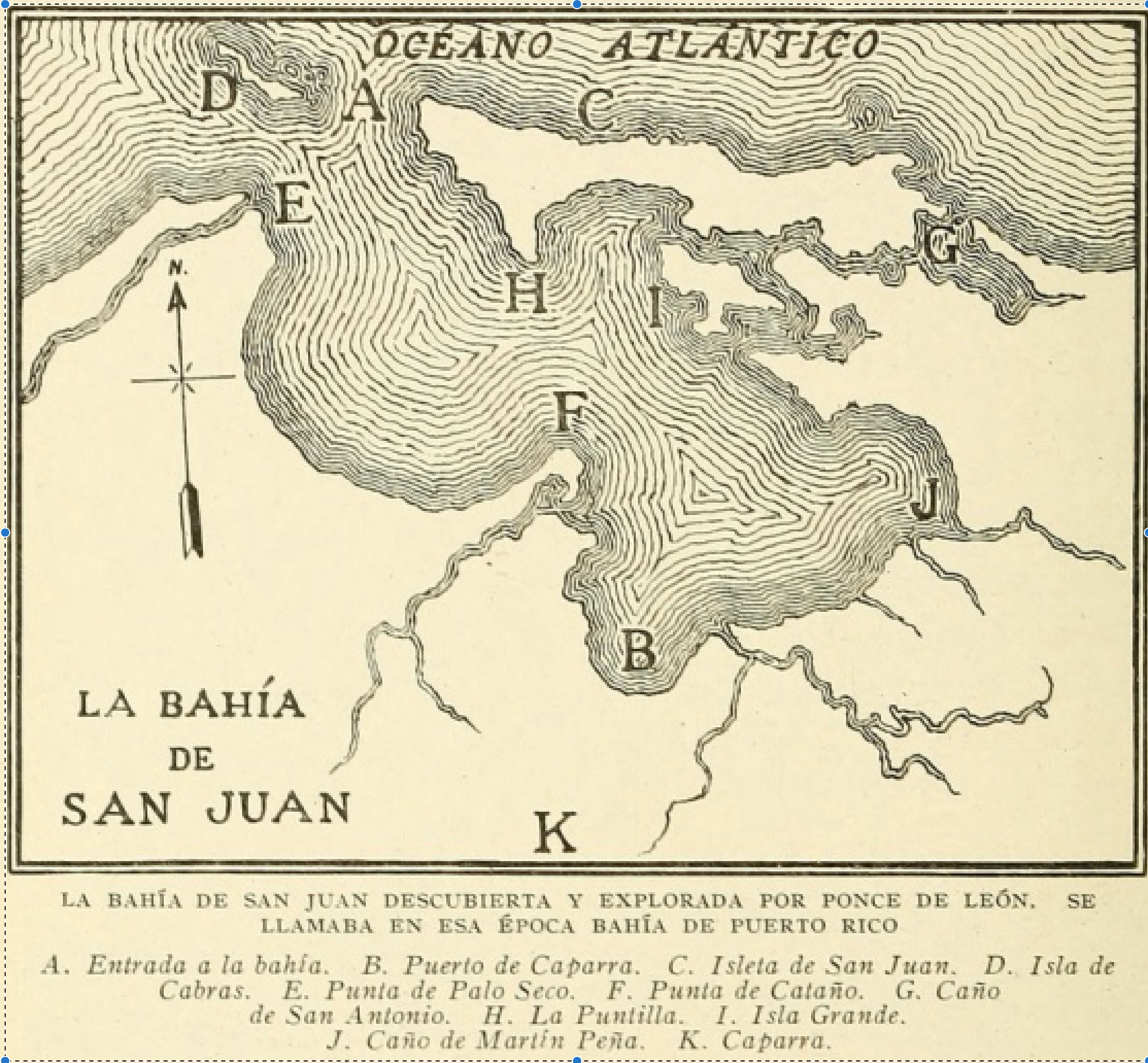
Paul Gerard Miller, 1922

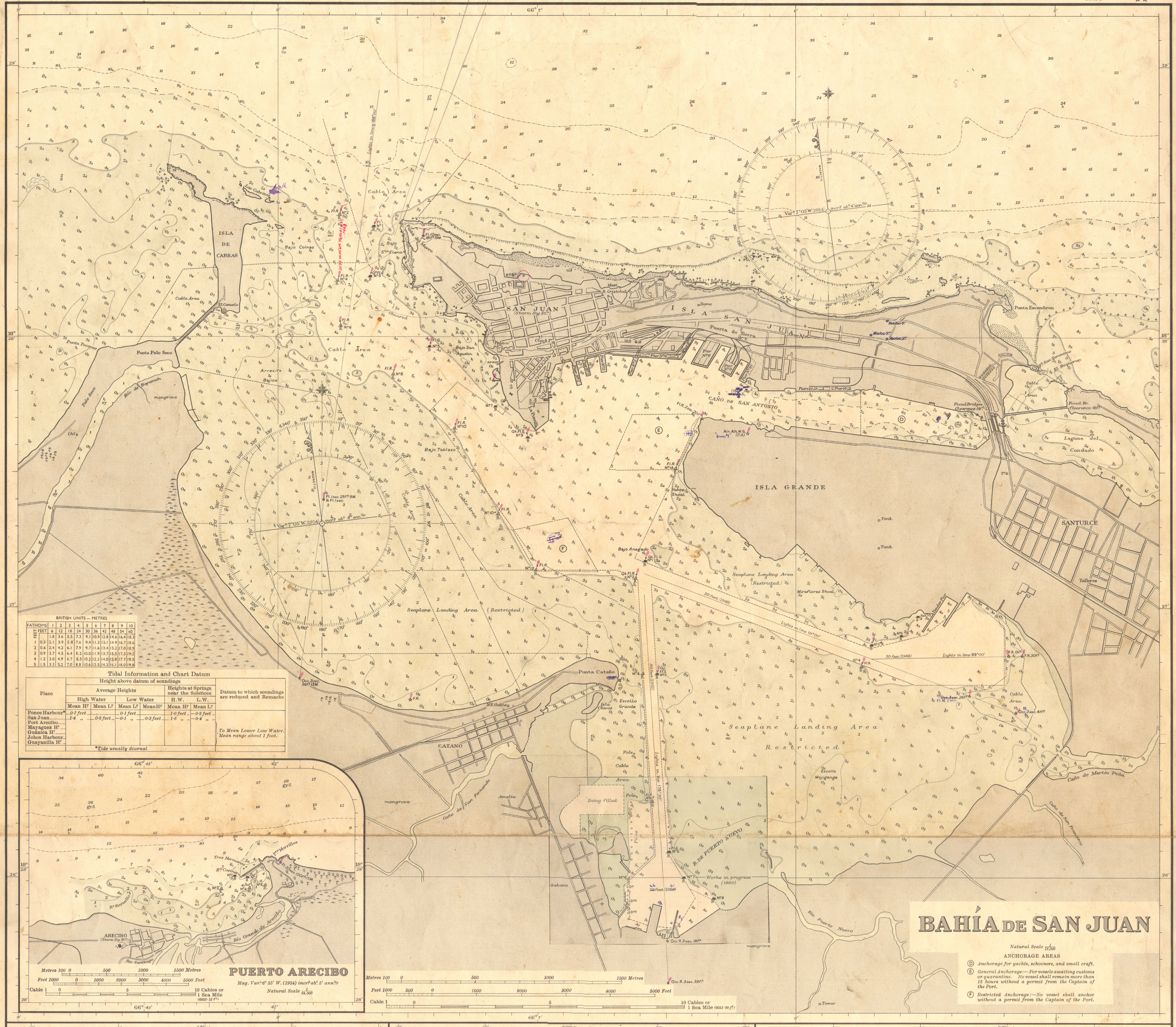
United Kingdom Hydrographic Office, 1954

United States Coast and Geodetic Survey, 1992

== Gallery ==
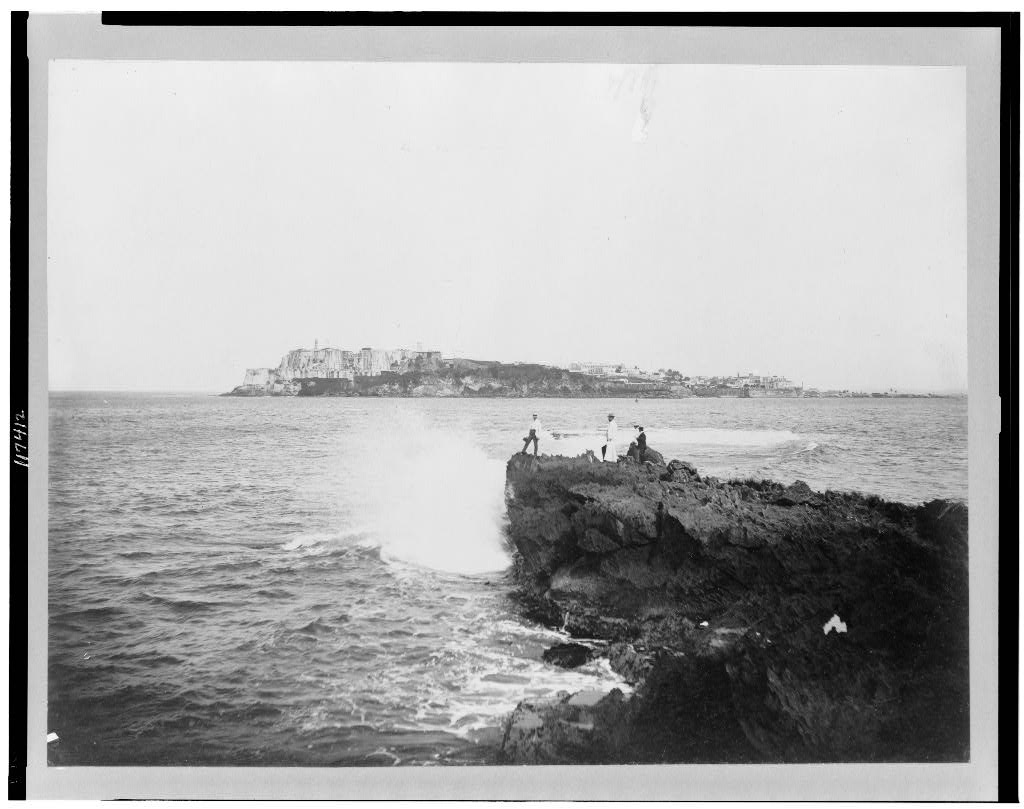
San Juan Bay entrance, seen from Isla de Cabras

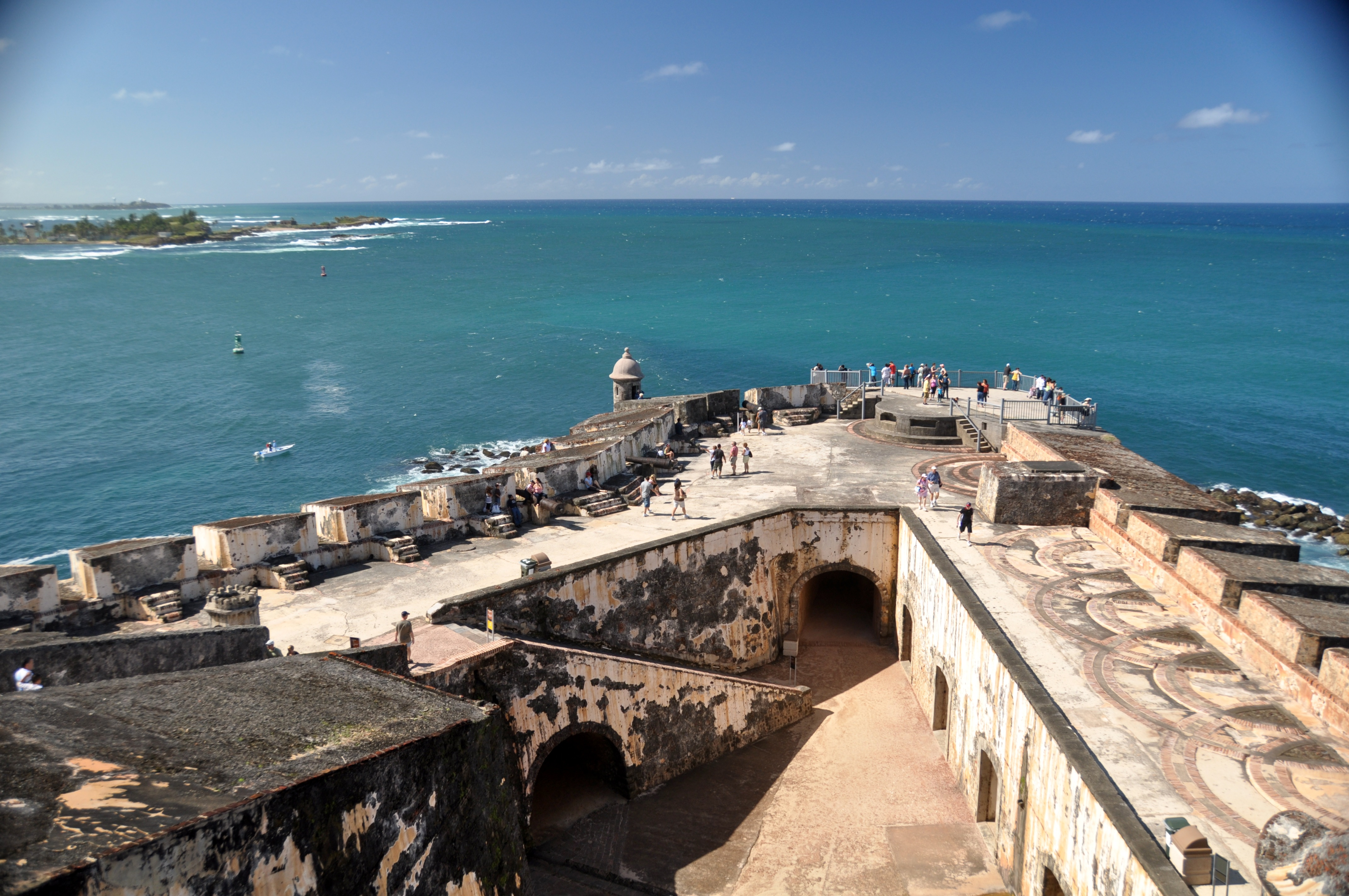
San Juan Bay entrance, seen from El Morro fortress

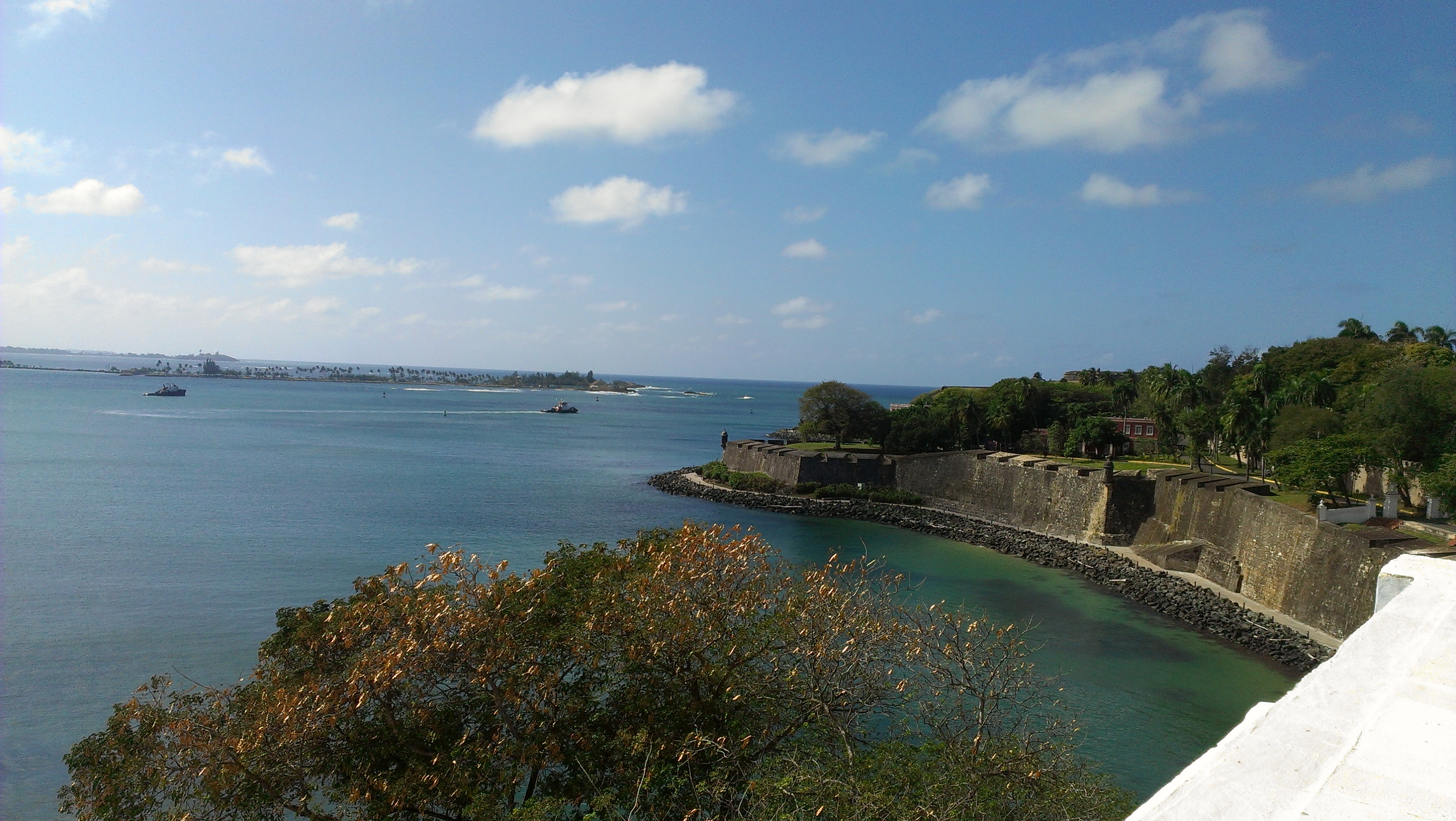
San Juan Bay entrance, seen from La Fortaleza palace

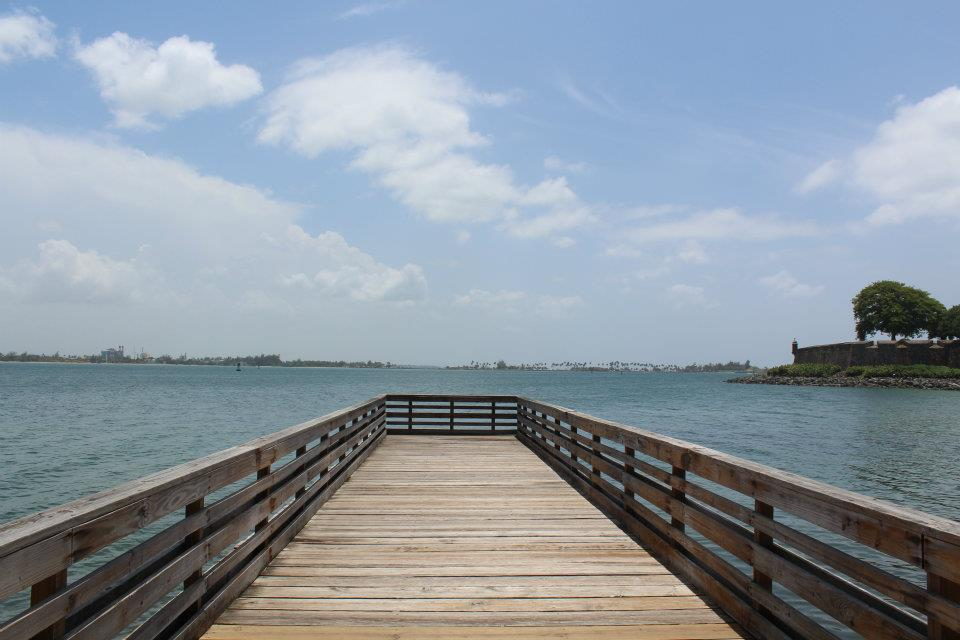
San Juan Bay entrance, seen from Paseo de la Princesa promenade

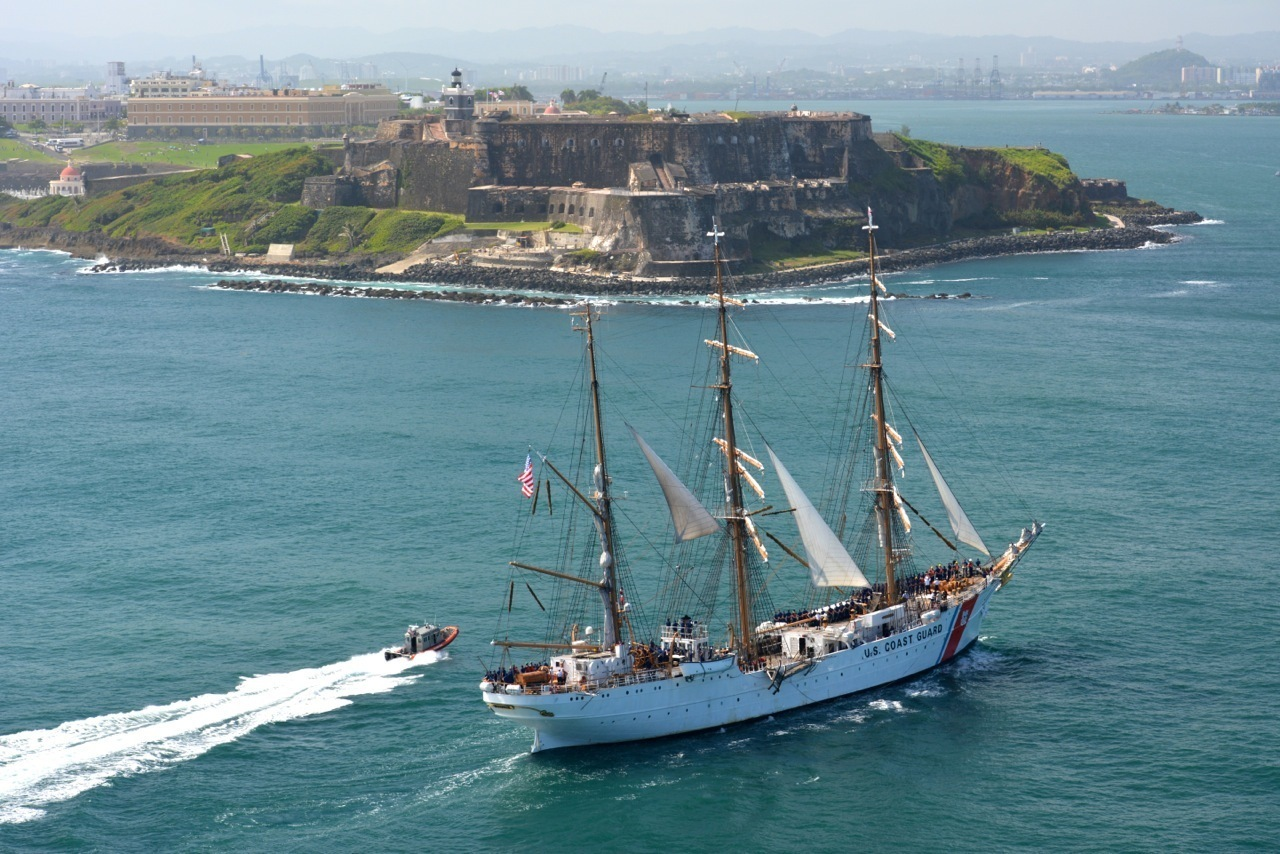
U.S. Coast Guard ship entering San Juan Bay

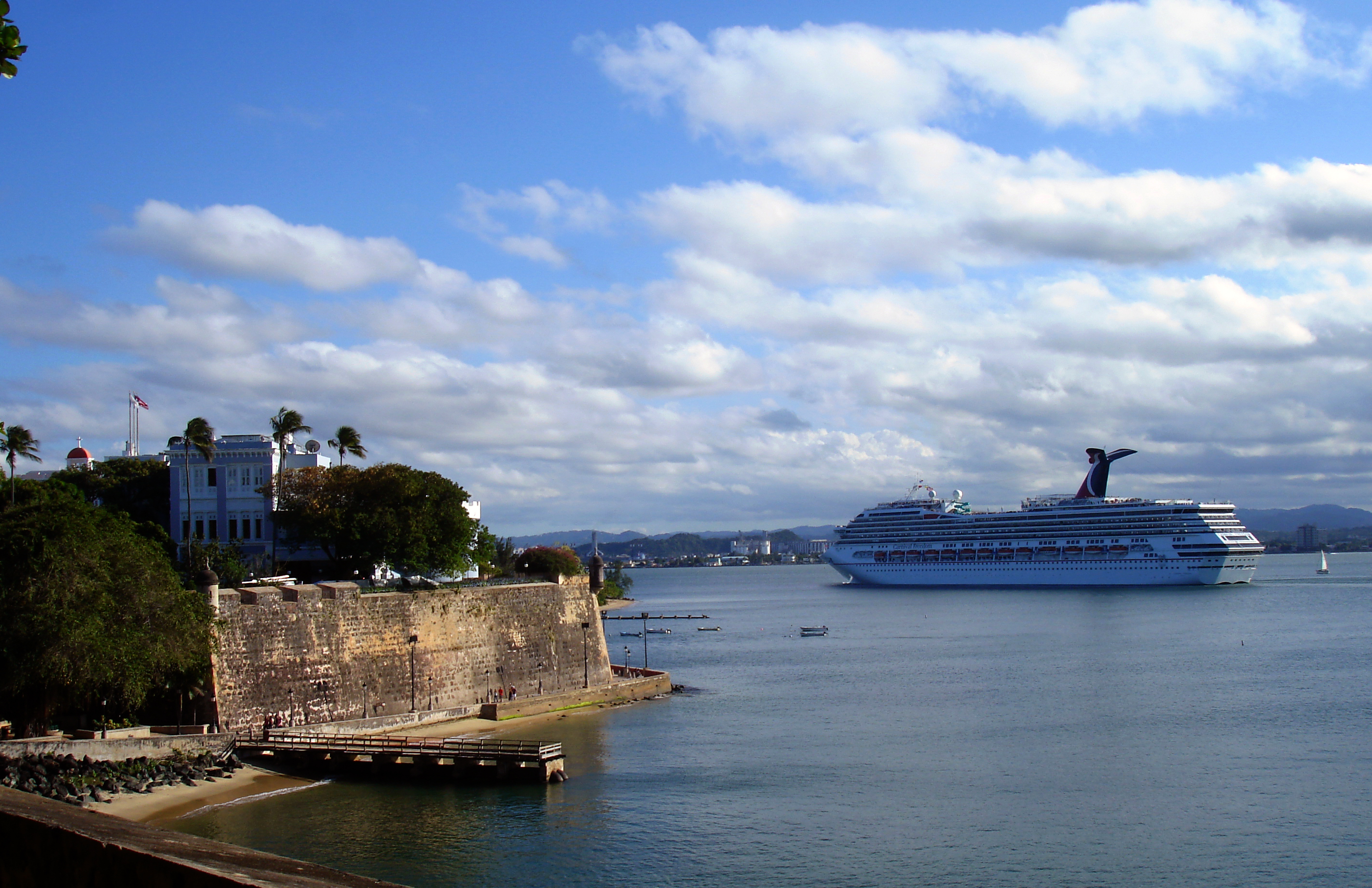
Cruise ship entering San Juan Bay

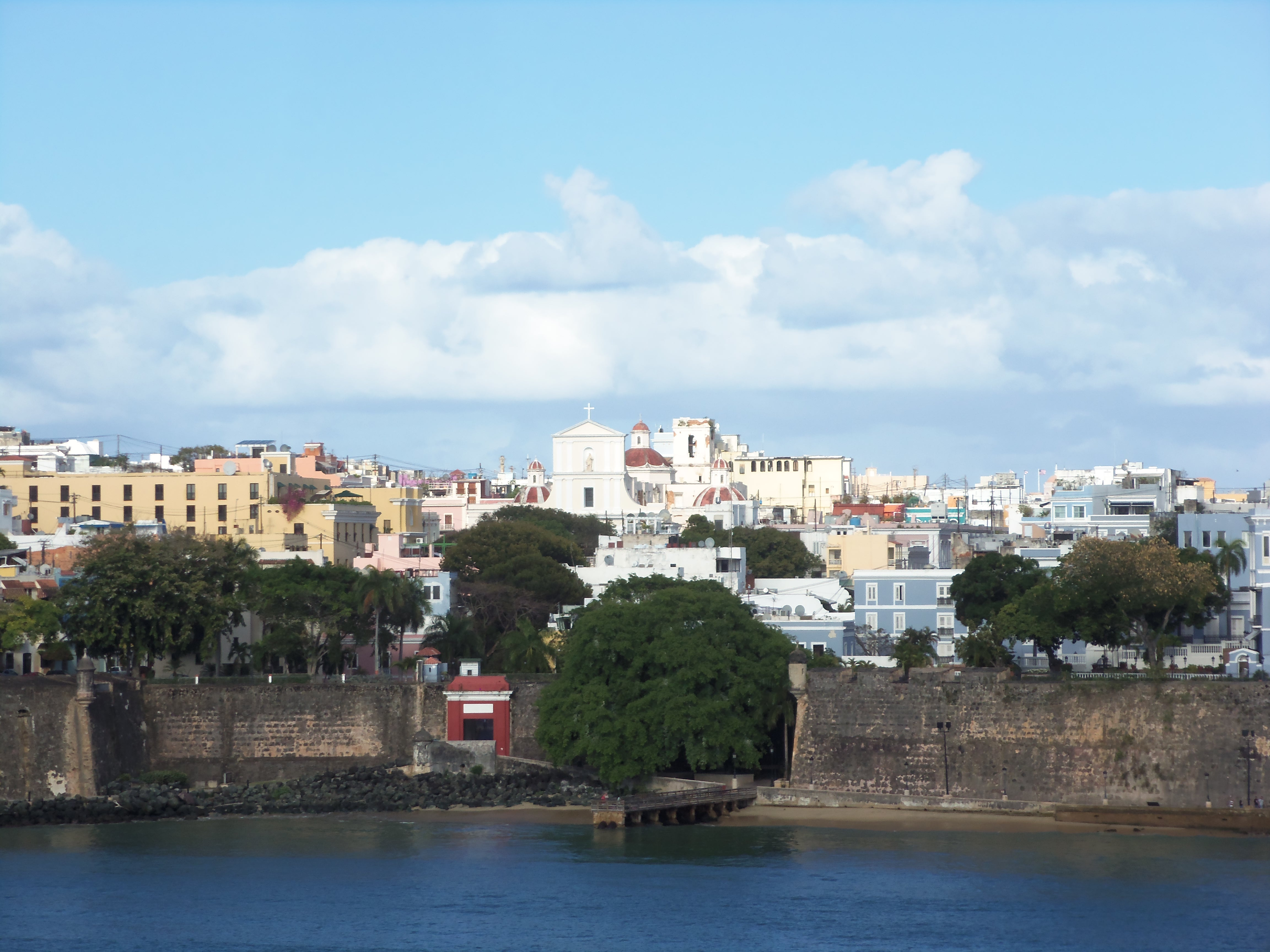
Old San Juan, seen from San Juan Bay

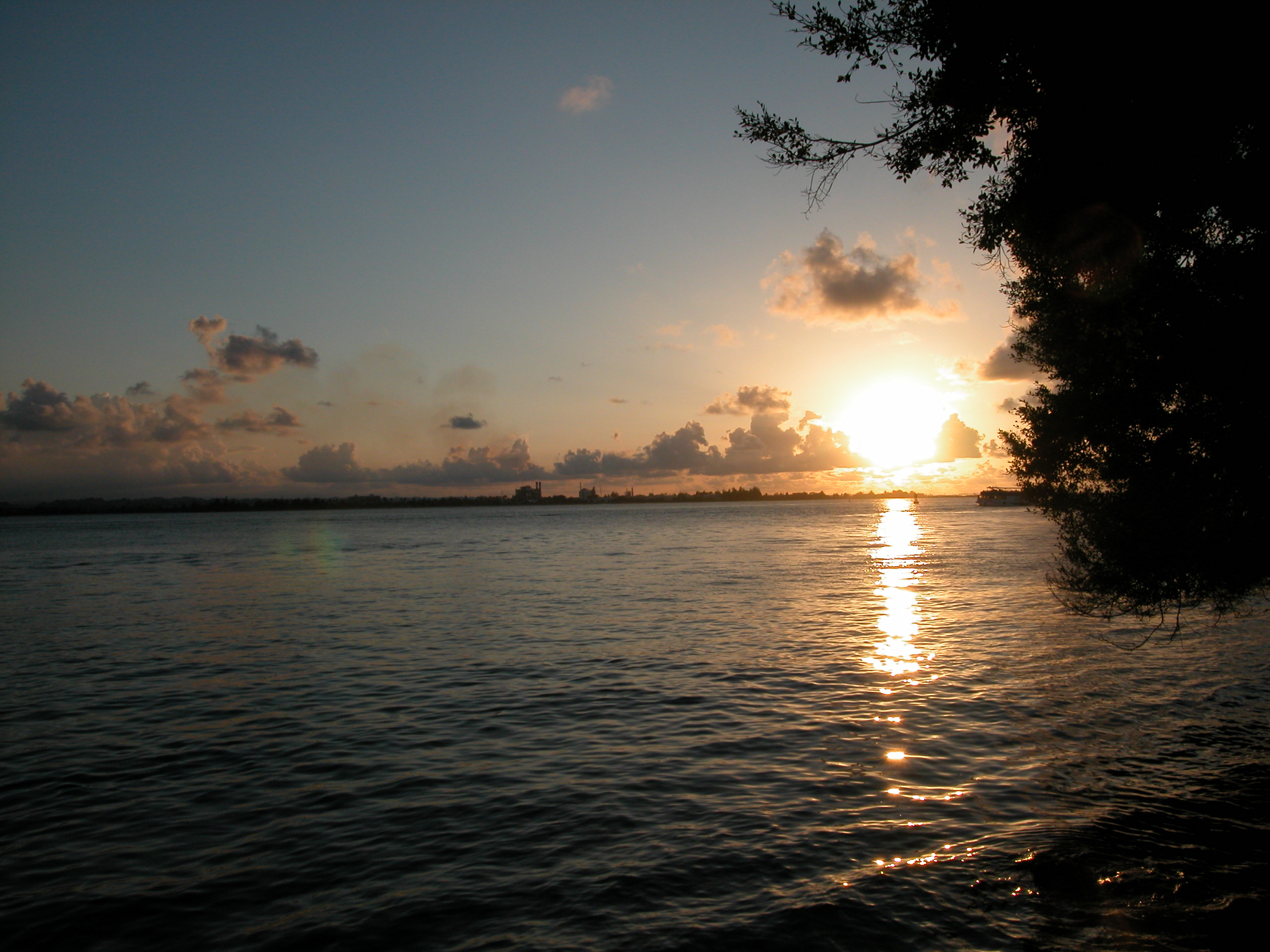
Sunset at San Juan Bay, seen from Paseo de la Princesa promenade

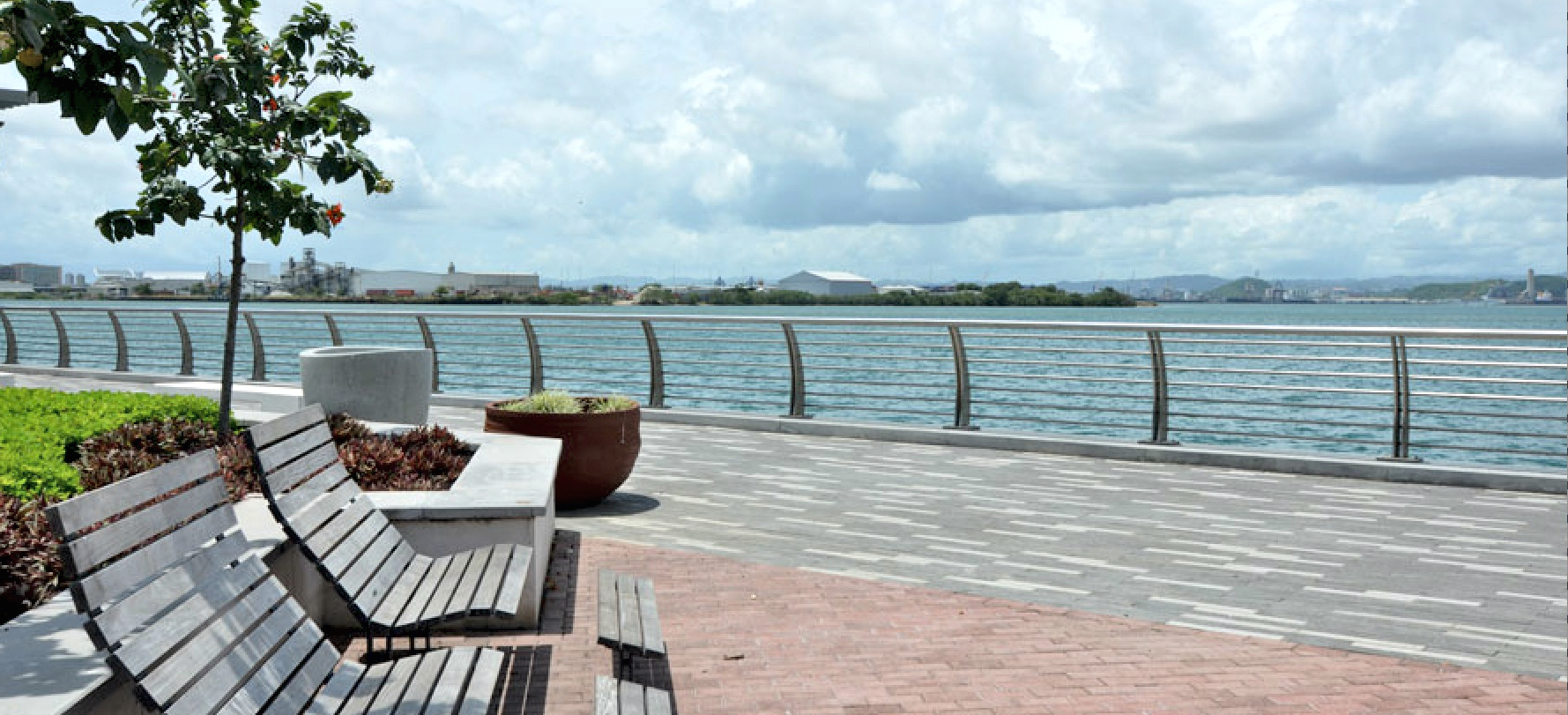
View of the bay from the pathway at Pier 8

== See also ==
- Battle of San Juan (1595)
- Fortín San Juan de la Cruz
