= Battle of San Juan (1595) =

Spanish victory during the Anglo–Spanish War

- Part of the Anglo-Spanish War (1585–1604)
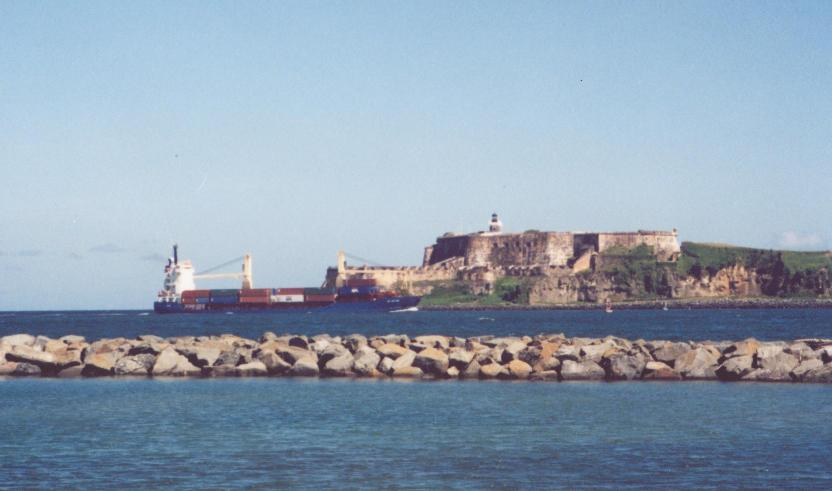
- Ship entering the San Juan Bay, in front of Fort San Felipe del Morro - view from Isla de Cabras.
Date	22 November 1595
Location	Viejo San Juan
Result	Spanish victory

Belligerents
Spain	(Kingdom of England) England

Commanders and leaders
Admiral Pedro Tello de Guzmán; Admiral Gonzalo Méndez de Cancio; Capt. Sancho Pardo Donlebún; Governor Pedro Suárez Coronel	Francis Drake

Strength
5 frigates 700 soldiers and 800 sailors 70 land-based guns	25 ships 2,500 soldiers and sailors

Casualties and losses
1 frigate burnt 40 killed	8–10 ships sunk 400 killed

The Battle of San Juan (1595) was a Spanish victory during the Anglo–Spanish War. This war broke out in 1585 and was fought not only in the European theatre but in Spain's American colonies. After emerging from six years of disgrace following the resounding defeat of the English Armada at Lisbon in 1589, Francis Drake embarked on a long and disastrous campaign against the Spanish Main, suffering several consecutive defeats there. On 22 November 1595 Drake and John Hawkins tried to invade San Juan, Puerto Rico with 27 ships and 2,500 men. After failing to be able to land at the Ensenada del Escambron on the eastern end of San Juan Islet, he attempted to sail into San Juan Bay with the intention of sacking the city. Unable to capture the island, following the death of his comrade, John Hawkins, Drake abandoned San Juan, and set sail for Panama where he died from disease and received a burial at sea after failing to establish an English settlement in America.

== Background ==
Queen Elizabeth I of England sent Sir Francis Drake and Sir John Hawkins on an expedition against the Spanish stronghold of Puerto Rico and Panama, in an attempt to strike a blow against the source of Spain's gold and silver. They set sail from Plymouth on 28 August 1595, with a fleet of 27 ships and 2,500 men. Previous to that, the Spanish West Indian Fleet under the command of General Sancho Pardo Osorio had sailed from Havana on 10 March with 2,000,000 pesos in gold and silver, bound for Spain. Damage from a storm in the Old Bahama Channel five days later necessitated a trip to Puerto Rico for repairs, which was reached on 9 April. The treasure cargo was placed in La Fortaleza for safekeeping while repairs were undertaken. Admiral Pedro Tello de Guzmán, commanding five frigates, was sent to retrieve the treasure. Along the way to Puerto Rico, Tello captured one of Drake's ships, the Francis, near Guadeloupe, upon which he learned of Drake's mission, and hastened to Puerto Rico ahead of Drake.

== Battle ==
General Sancho took command of the shore defences, Admiral Gonzalo Mendez de Cauzo commanded the forts, while Tello defended the harbour with his frigates. The Spanish decided to sink two vessels at the harbour entrance, with Tello's frigates just behind, to prevent the English from entering the harbour. The Spanish defence consisted of 1500 men, 800 of whom manned the 5 frigates, with 70 land-based cannon in addition to those on the frigates. Hawkins had died on 12 November from a fever, while Drake arrived offshore Puerto Rico on 22 November, anchoring off the Boquerón Inlet. The Spanish artillery and scored hits upon Drake's ship, Defiance, killing Sir Nicholas Clifford and Browne. Drake moved his fleet to the vicinity of Isla de Cabras on 23 November.

According to a Spanish account,

The same Thursday, 23rd, San Clement's Day, at ten o'clock at night, when it was quite dark, the enemy commenced an attack on the port with twenty-five boats, each carrying fifty or sixty men well armed, with the view of burning the frigates, as was afterwards seen, and they all entered up close to the platform of the Rock (battery), ranging themselves under the fire of the artillery...Most of the boats attacked the Capitana, the Texeda frigate, setting fire to her at the bow, and throwing into her a quantity of fire-pots and shells while ours succeeded in extinguishing the flames before they had done any damage, the fight being carried on by cannon, musquetry and stones.

At the same time they set fire to the Sta. Ysabel and Magdalena frigates, and to the Sancta Clara, which was extinguished; but the third time that the Magdalena frigate, of which Domingo de Ynsaurraga was captain, took fire, it was impossible to extinguish the flames, as the ship took fire at the stern and burned furiously; and all that could be done to maintain a footing on board, was done by the aforesaid captain and the people with him, until the ship was just burnt down and twelve men were killed by the enemy's musquetry, besides as many more burnt...The battle lasted for an hour, the most obstinately contested that was ever seen, and the whole port was illumined by the burning frigate in a manner favourable for the rest, who could thus see to point our artillery and that of the forts, with which, and with the musquetry and stones thrown frown the frigate, they did such effect, that the enemy, after about an hour, during which the combat lasted, as I have said, retreated with the loss of nine or ten boats and more than four hundred men, besides many more wounded; while on our side, the only loss was that of the frigate and forty men killed or burnt, besides a few wounded by the musquetry.

On 25 November, Drake's fleet gave up the fight and departed.

== Aftermath ==
The Spanish treasure fleet finally left Puerto Rico on 20 Dec. 1595, bound for Spain.

This defeat ended English hopes of establishing a presence in the Caribbean Sea. After an attempt to cross the Isthmus of Panama in January 1596 also ended in defeat, Drake succumbed to dysentery and on 28 January he would die.

== Popular culture ==
The battle is mentioned in Lope de Vega's poem La Dragontea.
