= Sancho Pardo Donlebún =

Sancho Pardo Donlebún, also called Sancho Pardo Osorio, (Donlebún, near Castropol, Asturias, Spain, circa 1537 - drowned in the Atlantic Ocean, near Lisbon, October, 1607), was a Spanish admiral.

== Interventions against the Caribbean Pirates ==
He participated in the Battle of San Juan (1595).

== Pardo's activities near England and Ireland ==
He took part in the Spanish Armada's planned invasion of England around 1588, and in the Nine Years Anglo-Irish War supported Hugh O'Neill, 2nd Earl of Tyrone.

== Pardo's private life ==
In 1567 Sancho Pardo returned to Spain after 14 years residence in Italy, including missions to protect the Western Mediterranean against the Turkish Fleets and the defeat of the Spanish Fleet in 1560 off the island of Djerba, Tunisia.

He married, Juana Manrique de Lara y Valdés.
