= El Boquerón (San Juan, Puerto Rico) =

Body of water located in Puerto Rico

Coordinates: 18°27′41″N 66°5′3″W

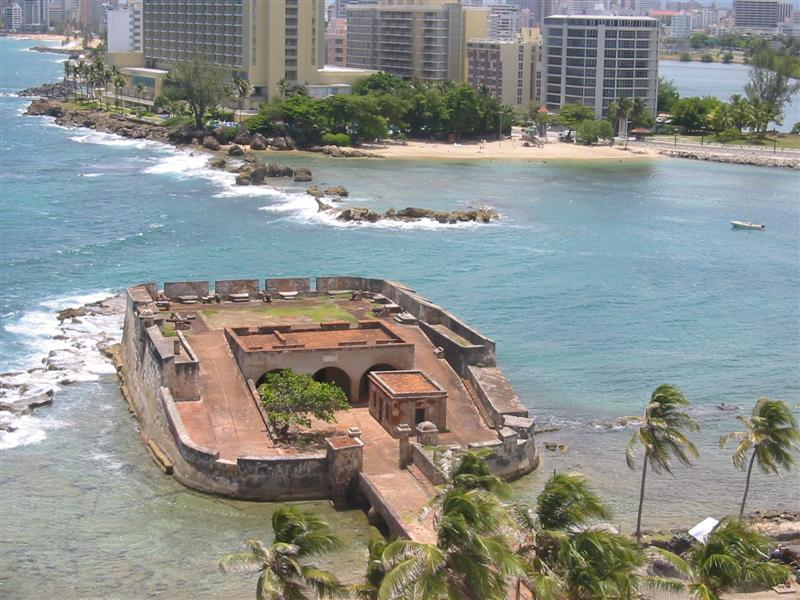
View of El Boquerón and its fort from the Caribe Hilton Hotel

El Boquerón is a body of water located at the intersection of the Condado Lagoon and the San Antonio Channel in San Juan, Puerto Rico. This body of water separates the Islet of San Juan, where Old San Juan and Puerta de Tierra are located, from El Condado and the Isla Grande peninsula in Santurce. It is separated from the San Antonio Channel by the San Antonio Bridge and from the Condado Lagoon by the Dos Hermanos Bridge. This body of water contains coral reef and habitats important to plant and animal life; it is part of the bigger San Juan Bay National Estuary. These bodies of water are often visited by manatees. The Playita del Condado (Spanish for "Condado's little beach") is located at the eastern end of El Boquerón.

As the natural border between the original settlement of San Juan and the mainland of Puerto Rico, El Boquerón was a critical strategic point throughout the history of the city. Numerous bridges crossed it throughout the history, most of which would be burned down during British and Dutch invasions. The Fortín de San Gerónimo del Boquerón, also known as San Jerónimo Fortress, was built during the 18th century to replace an older fortress then known as Fort Boquerón Battery, which was used in 1595 and 1598 by the Spanish to defend San Juan from attacks by Sir Francis Drake and George Clifford, the 3rd Earl of Cumberland, respectively.

Other forts that no longer exist on this body of water include Fort San Antonio (today occupied by San Antonio Bridge) and Fort Escambrón (today the area of the Caribe Hilton Hotel and the Escambrón Cove).

El Boquerón used to be the site of a natural landmark known locally as Perro de Piedra (Stone Dog) or Piedra del Perro (Dog Rock), a reef formation resembling the shape of a sitting dog when seen from Dos Hermanos Bridge. Numerous legends were attributed to the rock formation. The rock used to be so well known that it (and its surrounding coral reef) was declared a cultural and natural landmark in the year 2000. The Piedra del Perro formation stood until 2016 when it was completely destroyed by strong waves.

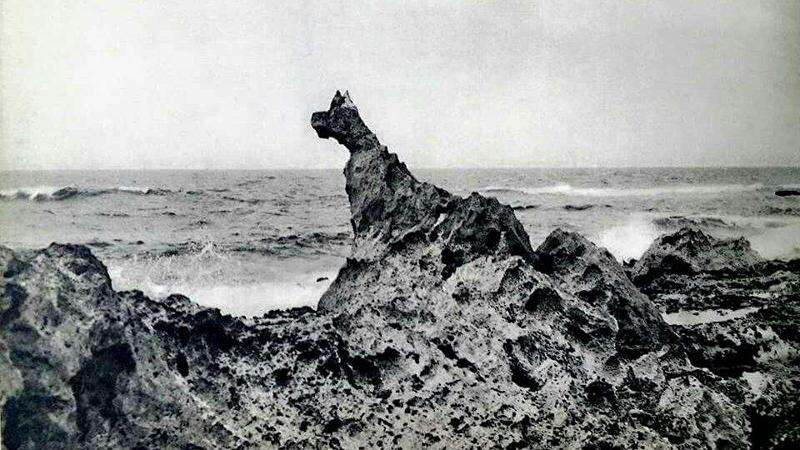
Perro de Piedra, unknown date.

== See also ==
- Condado Lagoon
- Islet of San Juan
- San Juan Bay
