= Fortín San Antonio =

Fortification built by the Spanish in San Juan, Puerto Rico

Coordinates: 18.459857°N 66.086187°W

Fortín de San Antonio was a fortification built by the Spanish with the aim of fortifying the San Antonio Bridge, which connected the eastern end of San Juan Islet, the location of the colonial capital city, today the Old San Juan historic quarter, with modern-day Miramar in Santurce, which is itself another island. Respectively dating back to 1520 and 1551, the San Antonio fort and bridge were of great strategic importance, as they were the only land accessible entrance to San Juan Islet. Along with the nearby by San Gerónimo Fort and El Escambrón Battery, the San Antonio fort formed part of the first line of defense fortifications built along the eastern end of San Juan Islet. Only a small part of the fort survives today, as it was mostly demolished to accommodate the modern bridge, the Guillermo Esteves Bridge, which began to be constructed in 1925.

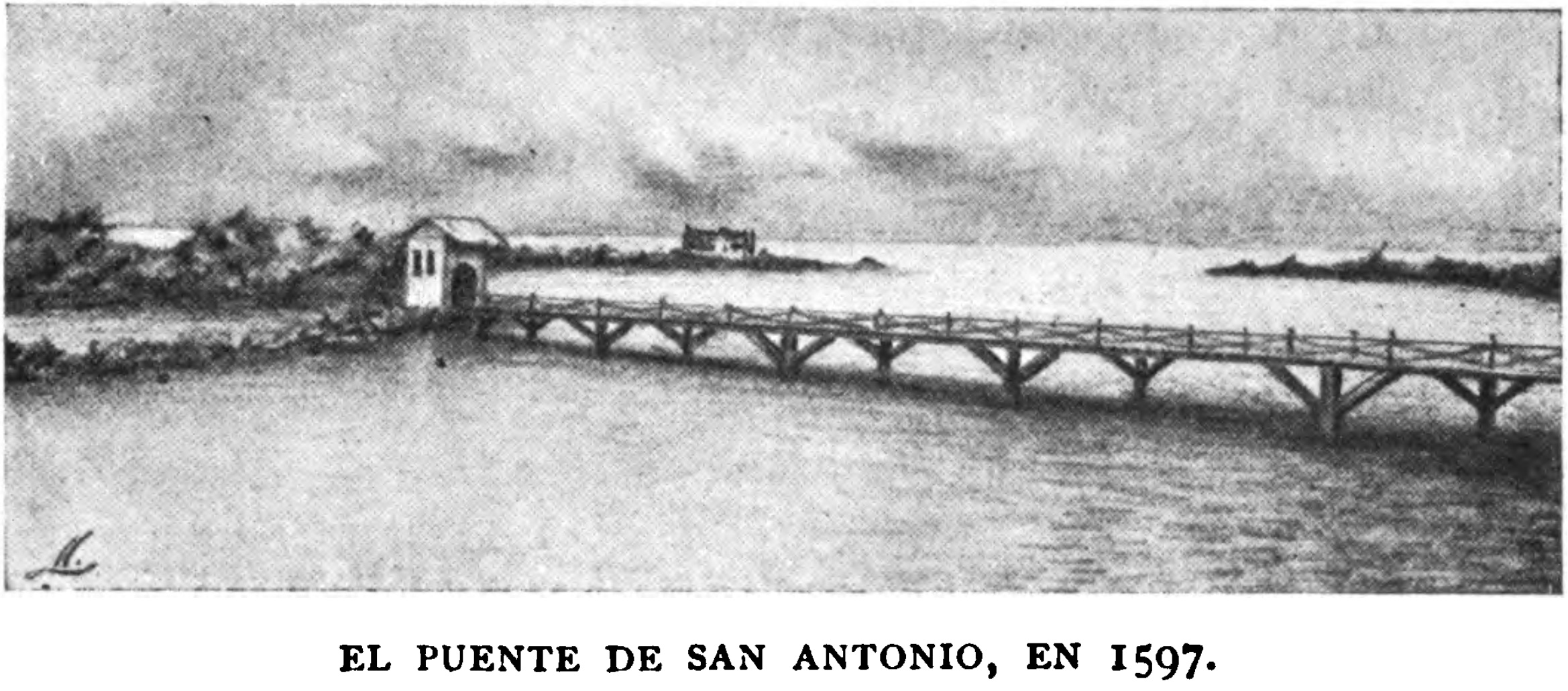
1919 drawing of the wooden San Antonio Bridge in 1597, where the Battle of San Juan (1598) took place.

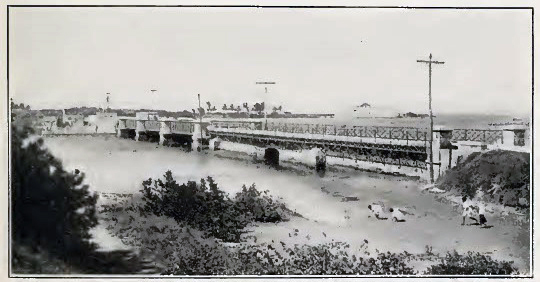

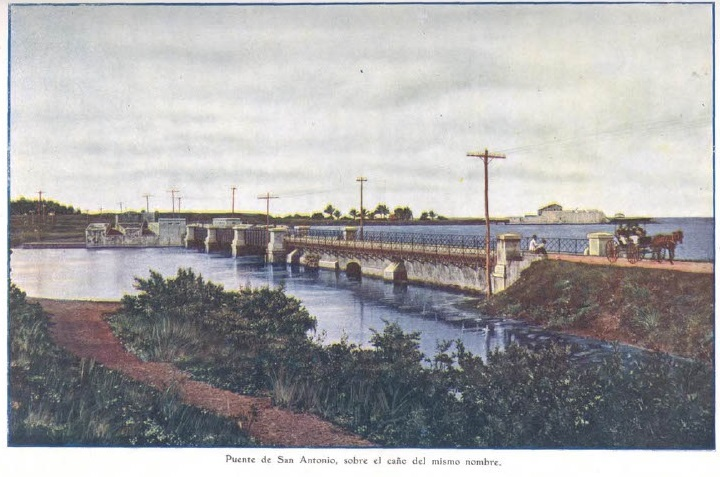
Bridge spanning San Antonio Channel (Caño de San Antonio) in 1922.

== History ==
Construction began in 1568 of the bridge which would link the islet of San Juan with the island of Puerto Rico. The bridge at this time was made of wood with a door with a permanent garrison.

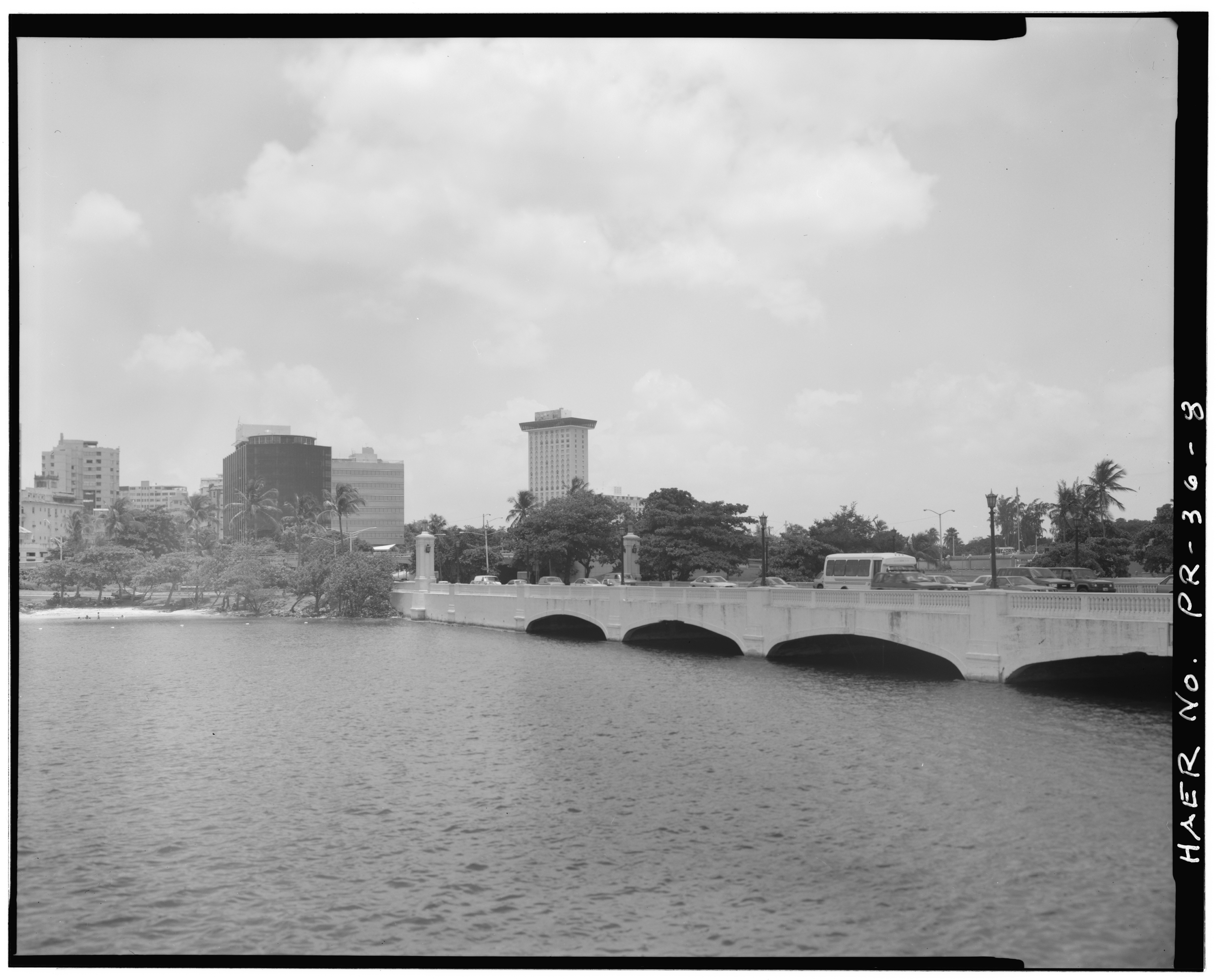
General oblique view-east side of south end, from the Dos Hermanos Highway Bridge - Puente Guillermo Esteves, Spanning San Antonio Channel, in 1995

In 1595, 26 ships led by the privateer Sir Francis Drake attempted to land his forces near the coast of Escambron. Coastal defenses in Boqueron and the cannon batteries of San Antonio bridge repelled his landing attempt, forcing Drake’s armada to withdraw and attempt to enter San Juan Bay. The bay defenses ultimately thwarted his attack.

In 1598, George Clifford, 3rd Earl of Cumberland, attacked the islet of San Juan. The English forces managed land at El Boquerón, and overwhelmed the Spanish defensive forces which had been debilitated by a recent dysentery outbreak. The English managed to lay siege to the city which subsequently surrendered. However, a disease outbreak which killed around 400 English troops forced the English to withdraw on 28 August.

In 1776, the fortified bridge of San Antonio was replaced by a new reinforced structure designed by Thomas O'Daly. The structure is later remodeled in 1783 by Juan Francisco Mestre. Further strengthening of the bridgehead was done by Ignacio Mascaro and Homar in 1796.

Both the fort of San Jeronimo as the fortified facilities San Antonio Bridge were instrumental in repelling the English attack of 1797, in which the English army, led by Sir Ralph Abercromby, besieged the island of San Juan. The batteries of Fort San Antonio were heavily damaged by English cannon fire.

The reconstruction and renovation of Fort San Antonio was completed in 1800 in which a battery of two cannons was added. In peacetime, the fort was used as a tax control point for cattle ranchers.

By 1822 the bridge was in great disrepair as well as the entire area including the fort of San Jeronimo and El Morro. Repairs were made under the leadership of Miguel de la Torre, who was serving as governor. In 1894, Governor Antonio Dabán ordered the demolition of the entire complex to build a new metal bridge into the islet of San Juan. The only remnants of Fort San Antonio which survive today is a small portion of a rampart which is visible between the new Guillermo Esteves bridge and Dos Hermanos Bridge.
