= Condado Lagoon =

Lagoon in San Juan, Puerto Rico

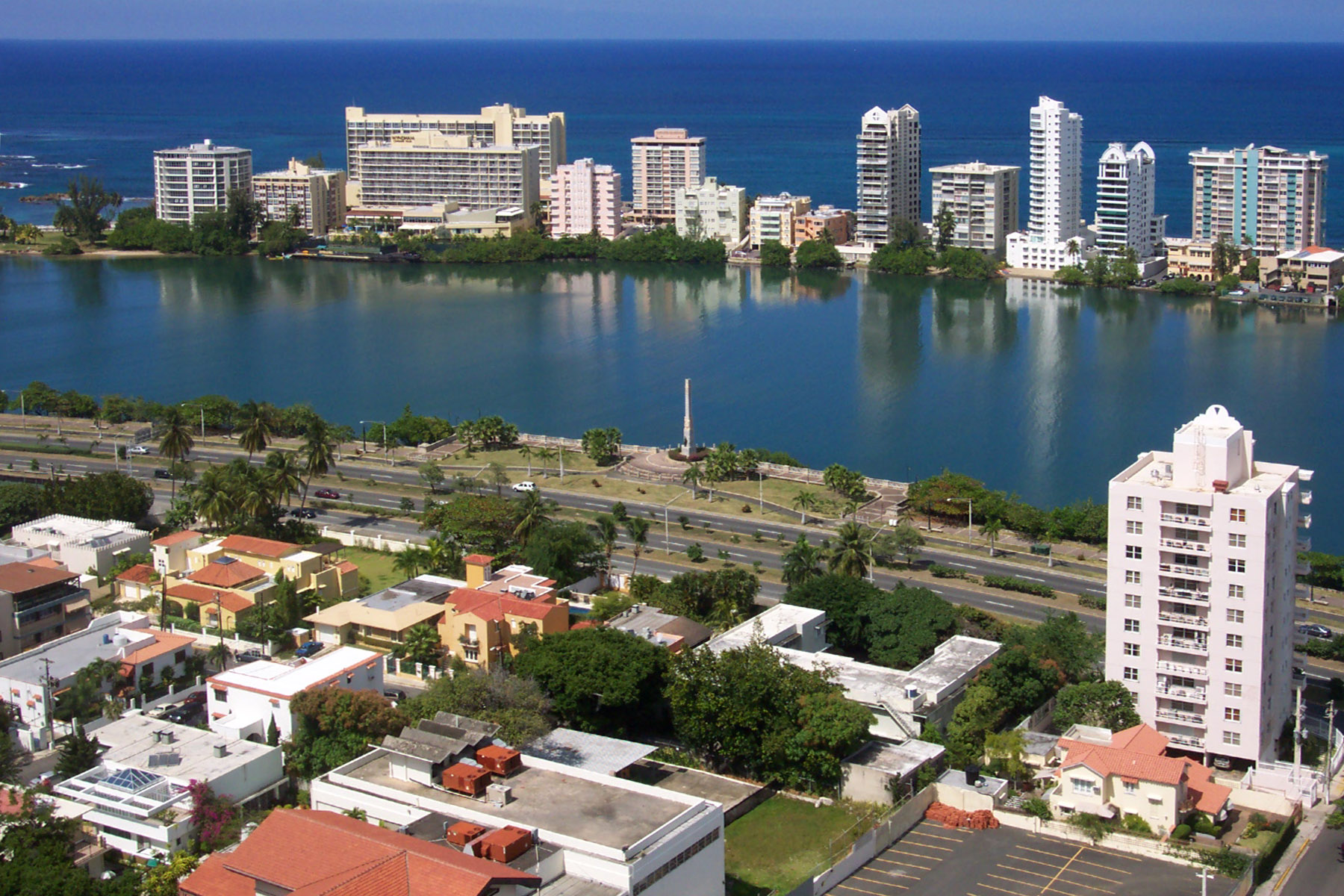
- Aerial view of Condado Lagoon towards Condado district, 2004
- Interactive map of Condado Lagoon
- Location: Santurce, San Juan, Puerto Rico
- Coordinates: 18°27′30″N 66°04′48″W
- Governing body: Department of Natural Resources

Condado Lagoon (Spanish: Laguna del Condado) is located in San Juan, Puerto Rico. It is an effluent body of water that flows freely between the Condado and Miramar neighborhoods of Santurce, a barrio of San Juan. It is connected to the Atlantic Ocean by El Boquerón to the north, and to the San Juan Bay by San Antonio Channel to the west.

== Geography ==
Condado Lagoon is one of the two main bodies of water which separate the San Juan Islet (Isleta de San Juan) from the main island of Puerto Rico. The lagoon itself has an area of 98.91 acres (400,300 m^{2}) and is surrounded by the Condado peninsula to the north and east, Miramar to the south, and the channels of El Boquerón and San Antonio to the northwest and west, respectively. It has an average depth of 10 feet (3.0 m) and a maximum depth of 36 feet (11 m).

== History ==
San Juan Bay and the Condado Lagoon, for the Christopher Columbus Quincentenary Jubilee Commission. 1992

In late 2020, the Condado Ocean Club Hotel, overlooking the Condado Lagoon and the Atlantic Ocean, opened its doors.

== Ecology ==
Due to its geographical, natural and recreational importance, the Condado Lagoon is protected as the Laguna del Condado Nature Reserve and Jaime Benítez Rexach State Park (Reserva Natural del Condado y Parque Nacional Profesor Jaime Benítez Rexach) a nature reserve and state park (locally known as parques nacionales in Puerto Rico). The protected area includes the lagoon itself and the surrounding mangrove forest consisting of red (Rhizophora mangle), white (Laguncularia racemosa), black (Avicennia germinans) and buttonwood mangrove (Conocarpus erectus) thanks to continuing restoration efforts.

Before the high urbanization of the area, the lagoon used to be frequented by high numbers of West Indian manatees. Although their numbers have greatly decreased, they are still a frequent visitor to the area. Along with other habitats in the San Juan estuary, it has been proposed as a federally designated critical habitat for the species since 2024. Other notable animal species of the lagoon include herons, terns, brown pelicans (Pelecanus occidentalis) and magnificent frigatebirds (Fregata magnificens).

== Nearest beach ==
- Condado Bridge Beach
