= Playita del Condado =

Beach located in Condado, Puerto Rico

Coordinates: 18°27′36″N 66°4′41″W

Condado Bridge Beach
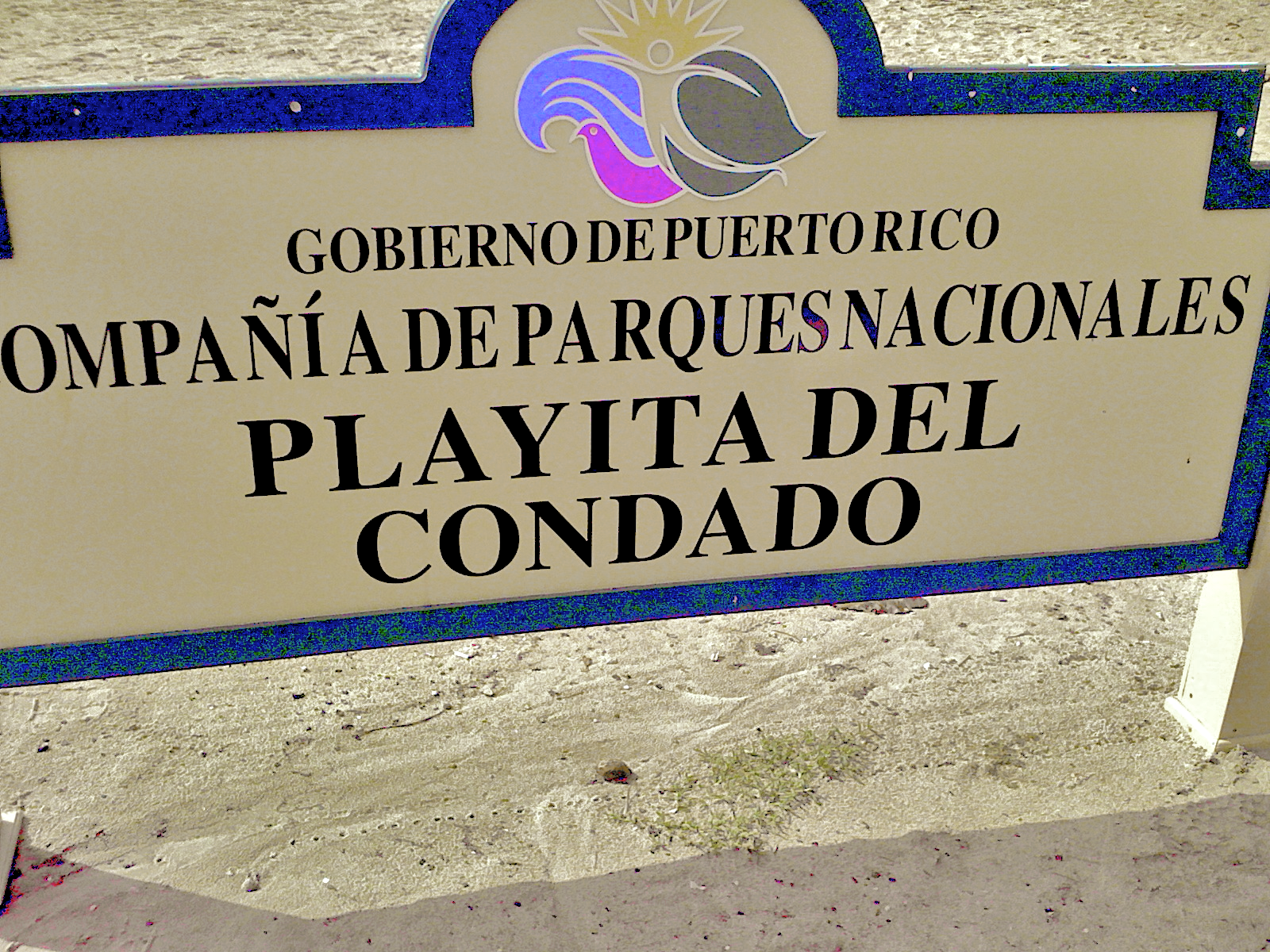
- Interactive map of Condado Bridge Beach
- Location: Santurce, San Juan, Puerto Rico
- Governing body: Department of Natural Resources

Playita del Condado is a beach located at the end of Avenida Ashford in Condado, Puerto Rico.

== Playita del Condado ==
Playita del Condado is a beach near Condado Lagoon. It is near Miramar and Isla Grande Boulevard and a seven-minute drive from Old San Juan.

In 2014, an open-air gym at Playita del Condado was inaugurated.
