= Caribe Hilton Hotel =

Luxury beachfront resort in San Juan, Puerto Rico

Coordinates: 18°27′50″N 66°5′6″W

Caribe Hilton
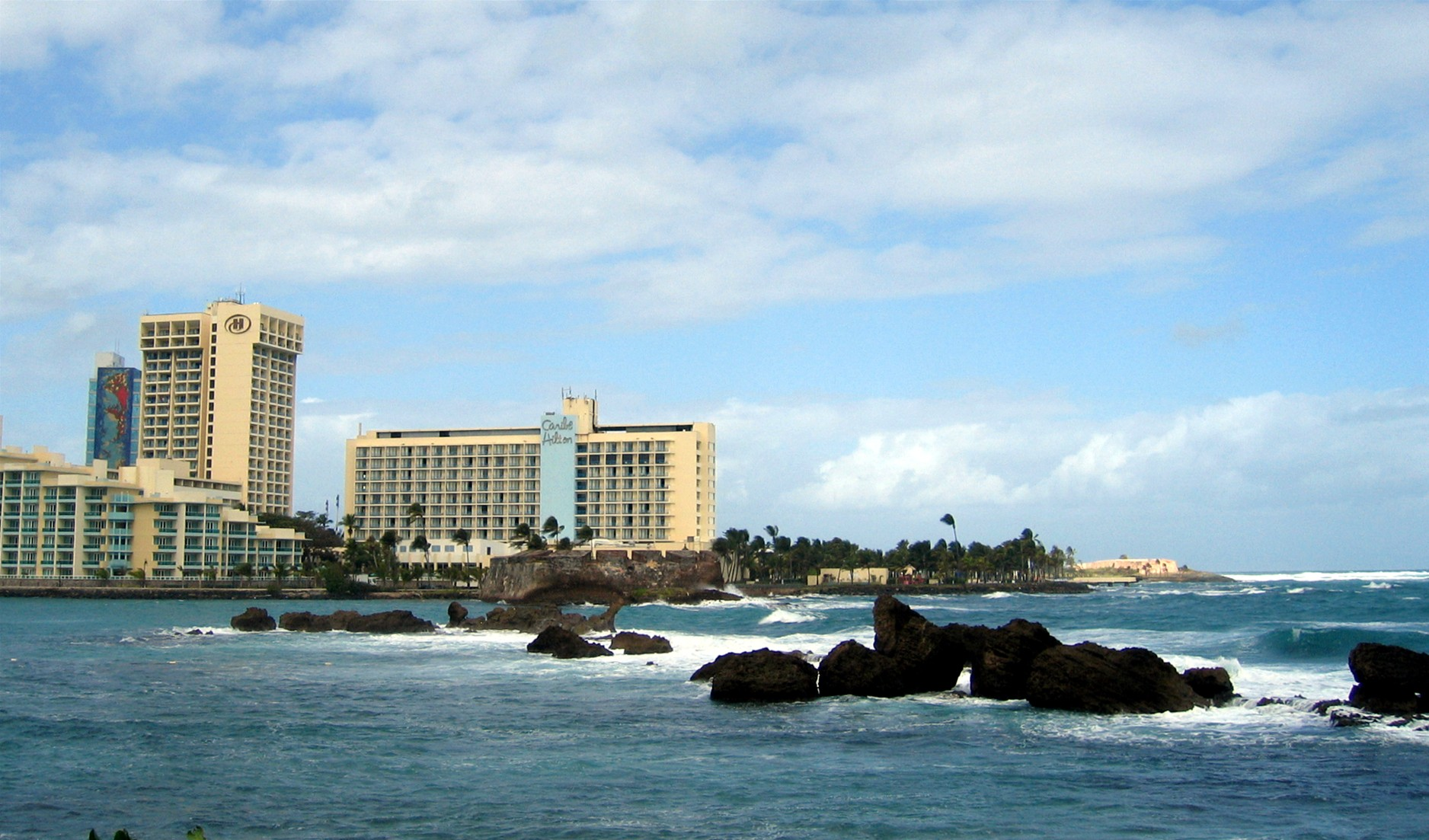
- Caribe Hilton Hotel in San Juan Islet from Dos Hermanos Bridge in Condado district, 2006
- Hotel chain: Hilton Hotels & Resorts

General information
- Location: San Juan, Puerto Rico, 1 San Geronimo Street, San Juan, PR 00901
- Opening: December 9, 1949
- Owner: Park Hotels & Resorts
- Operator: Hilton Worldwide

Design and construction
- Architect: Toro Ferrer

Other information
- Number of rooms: 652 rooms, 264 villas

Website
- caribehilton.com

The Caribe Hilton is located in the eastern end of San Juan Islet in San Juan, the capital city and municipality of Puerto Rico. Opened in 1949, the hotel is next to the 18th century San Gerónimo fort, overlooking the Condado resort district in the northwest of Santurce barrio in San Juan. It is owned by Park Hotels & Resorts and managed by Hilton Worldwide.

== History ==
In early 1946, as part of the Puerto Rican industrialization effort known as Operation Bootstrap, the Puerto Rico Industrial Development Corporation decided to erect a modern luxury hotel next to the 18th century Spanish Empire fortifications of Fortín de San Gerónimo and Batería del Escambrón in Puerta de Tierra. The facility would be owned by the Commonwealth of Puerto Rico, but leased to the multinational hospitality operator that provided the best price offer. The hotel would have 300 bedrooms and the necessary ancillary facilities.

A competition was held to select the design, with three architectural firms in Puerto Rico invited: Schimmelpfennig, the office of Henry Klumb, and Toro Ferrer. Two additional firms from Florida were also invited to participate: Frederick G. Seelman from Palm Beach and Robert Swartburg from Miami. These two firms submitted Spanish Renaissance-style designs, while the three Puerto Rican firms presented modern designs inspired by the International style. The final design chosen was by Toro Ferrer, who also designed the Modern Movement-style Supreme Court Building in San Juan.

To operate the hotel, the Puerto Rico Industrial Development Corporation invited seven leading American hotel firms. Conrad Hilton, being from New Mexico, responded with "Mi estimado amigo" and won over the Puerto Ricans. The creation of the hotel represented a partnership between the Puerto Rican government and US business. Americans viewed the creation of the hotel as a symbol of their power to create material progress. A majority of Puerto Rican citizens did not approve of the decision to build the hotel. They believed that the public funds would have better suited the island inhabitants if they were invested in improving education and social welfare. San Juan's fire chief of the time disapproved the government's decision to "degrade itself by buying tourists." Articles published by El Mundo in 1952 saw the American tourists as selfish people who did not care about the island and ones who would, in the future, convince the Puerto Rican people to serve them.

The Caribe Hilton opened on December 9, 1949. The government-backed Puerto Rico Industrial Development Company (PRIDCO) spent $7 million to build and furnish the hotel. After it was built, the government leased the hotel to the Hilton Corp. on a 20-year lease. The hotel was the first in Puerto Rico to offer radios in every room and individually controlled air conditioners.

Guests for the opening included Gloria Swanson, Eastern Air Lines President Eddie Rickenbacker, David Rockefeller and numerous other celebrities and notables. The hotel claims to be the birthplace of the Piña colada. In 1954, bartender Ramón "Monchito" Marrero spent three months creating a mix of rum, coconut cream, and pineapple juice. The drink was first served on August 15, 1954. The original hotel was expanded over the years from 300 rooms to 646 rooms. After managing the hotel for 48 years, Hilton International bought the property in 1998. Hilton closed the hotel the following year for a complete renovation, lasting nine months. It reopened on December 25, 1999 celebrating its 50th anniversary after $50 million in renovations. In 2005, the hotel was expanded with the huge Paseo Caribe complex, including shops, restaurants, and 264 villas marketed as the Condado Lagoon Villas.

In January 2017, ownership of the hotel was transferred to Park Hotels & Resorts when that company was spun off from Hilton Worldwide. In September 2017, the hotel was heavily damaged by Hurricane Maria, forcing it to close. It reopened in May 2019, following a US$100 million renovation.

== Famous guests ==
Its first of many famous guests were Gloria Swanson and Gertrude Ederle. Between the 1960s and 1980s, many important performers either worked or stayed at the Caribe Hilton, including Marco Antonio Muñiz. Other famous guests have included many world champion boxers during Puerto Rico's golden era of boxing. The national basketball teams of twelve countries also stayed there for 2003's pre-Olympic tournament of the Americas.

== In popular culture ==
Part of the television film Wizards of Waverly Place: The Movie was filmed in the outdoor pool area of the hotel. It is also the setting for Hunter S. Thompson's The Rum Diary. 22 Jump Street was also filmed in the lobby of the hotel.

== Photo gallery ==
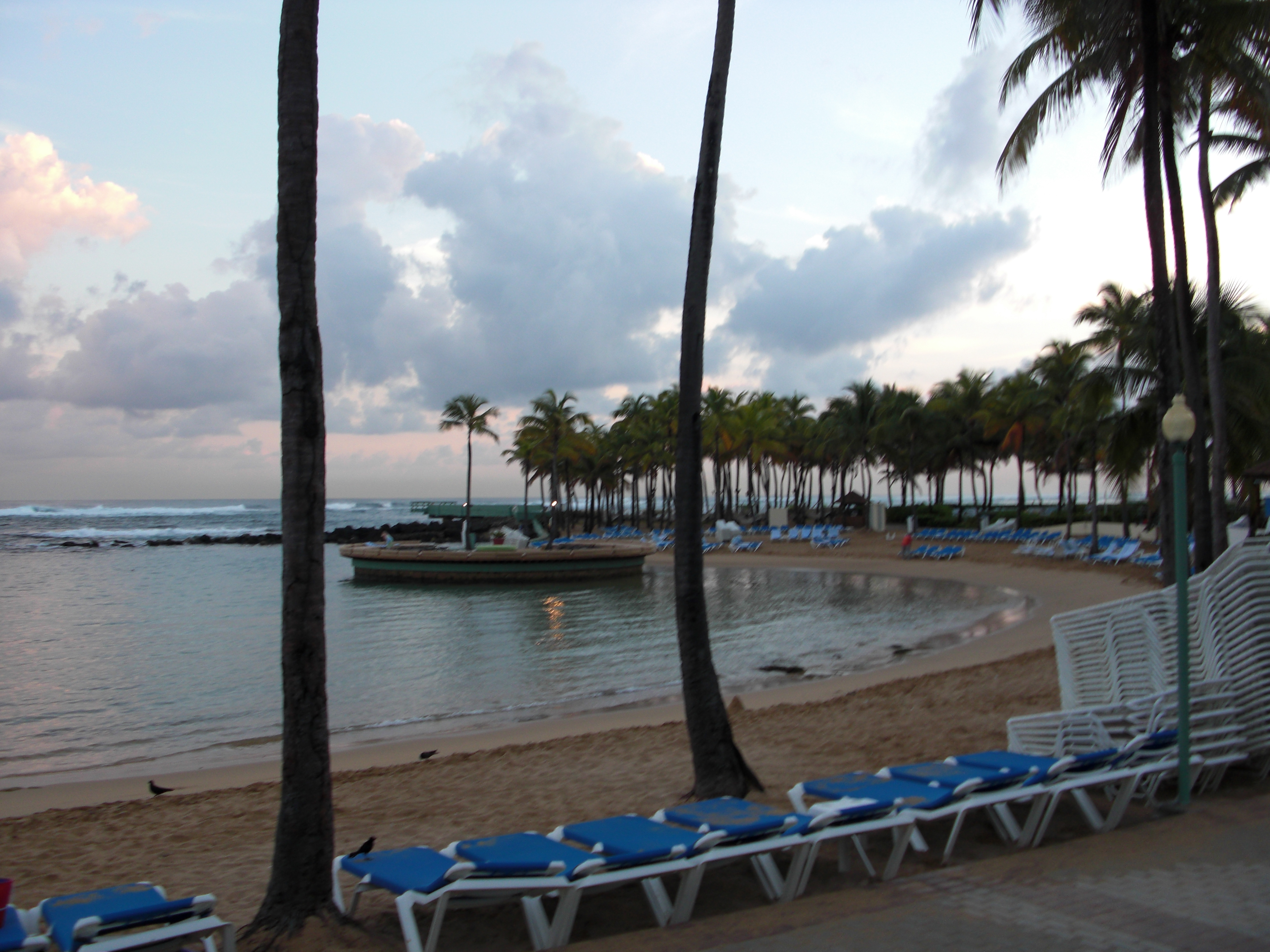
A view of the private beach at the Caribe Hilton.

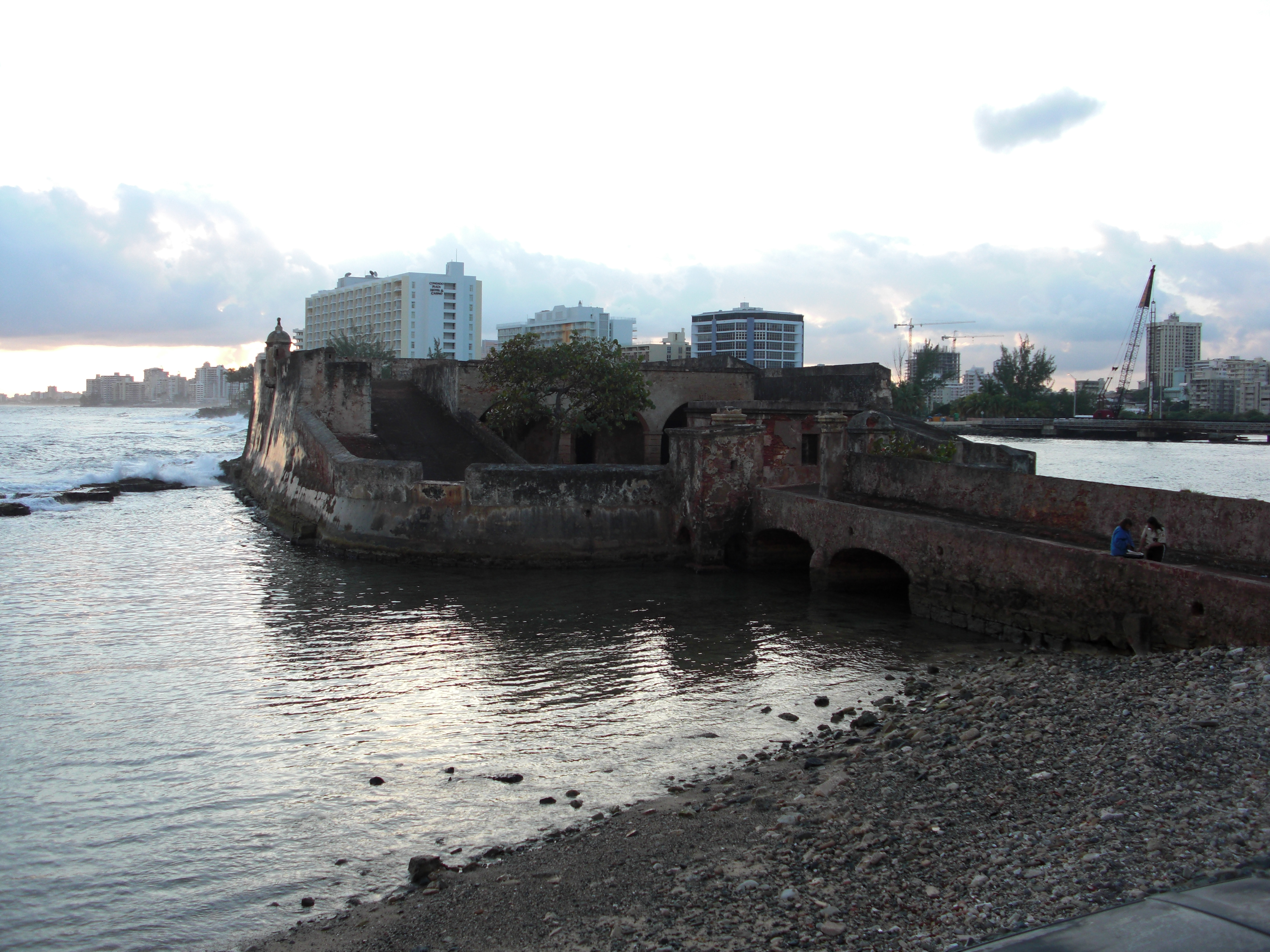
Fortín de San Gerónimo sits on the same exclusive property managed by Hilton.

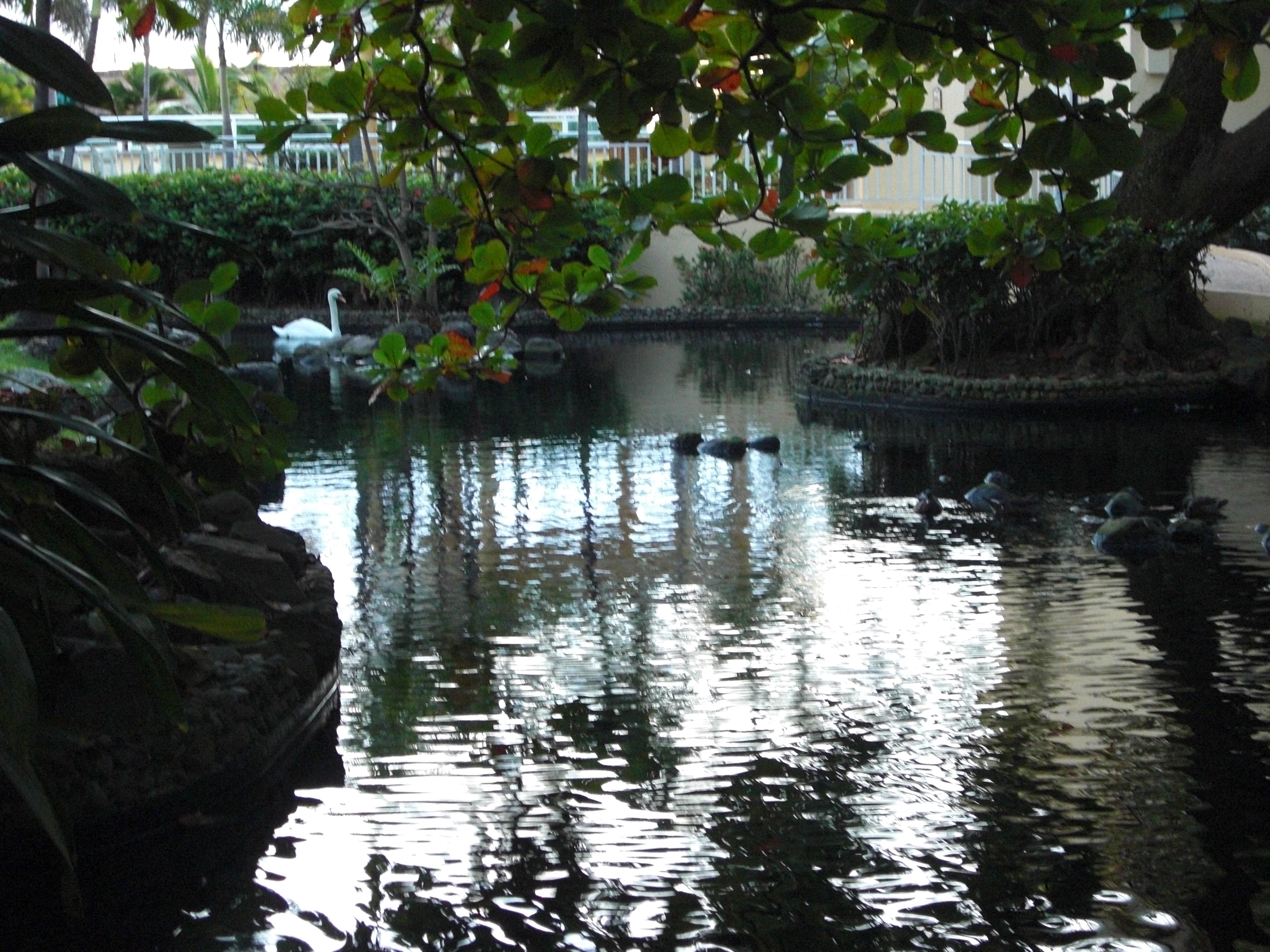
The lagoons at the Hilton are natural habitats for local fish and birds.

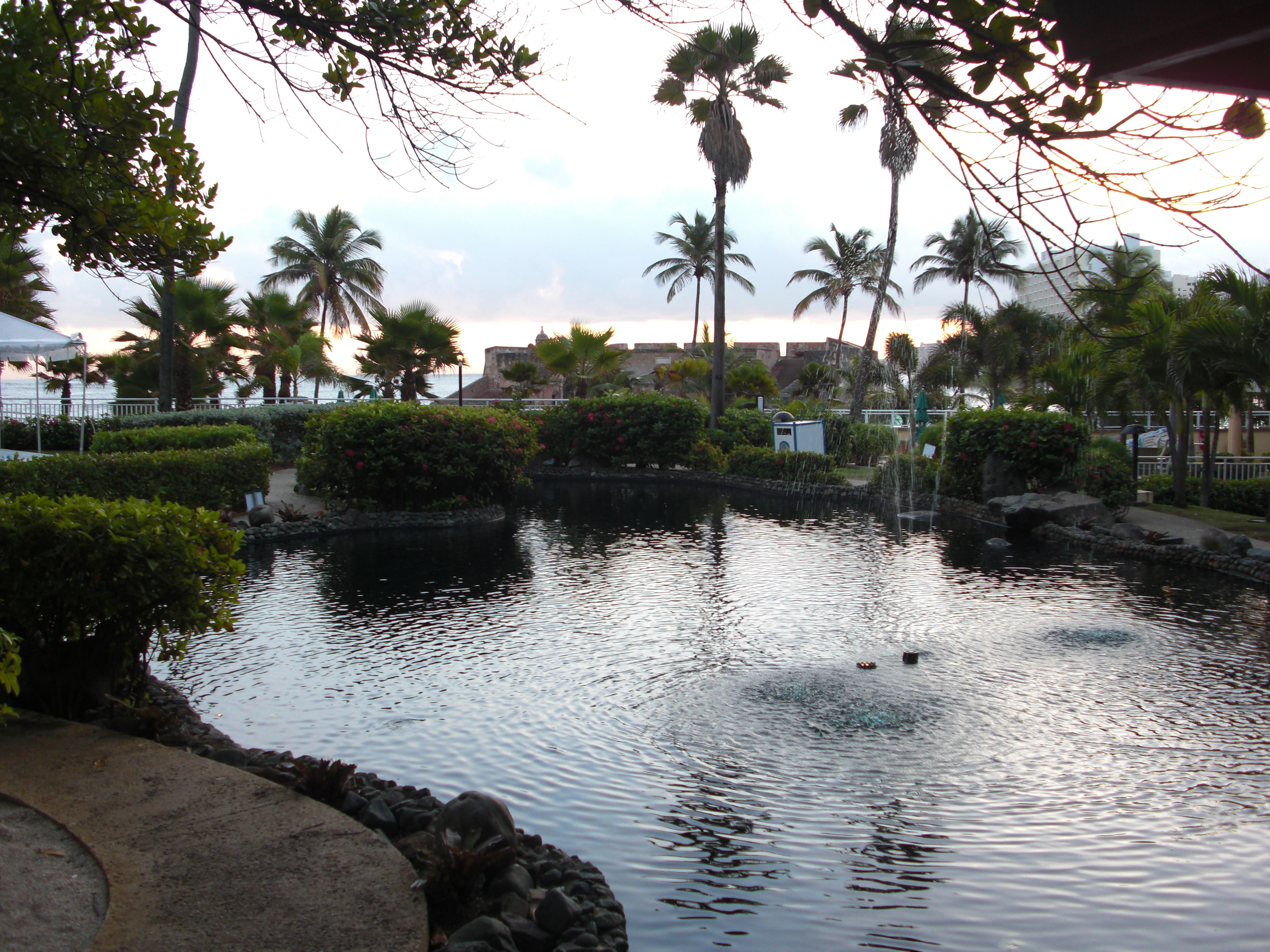
The Tropical Gardens.

== See also ==
- List of hotels in Puerto Rico
- Harry Fraticelli - who used to sing at Caribe Hilton early in his musical career
