= Fortín de San Gerónimo =

Small historic fort in San Juan, Puerto Rico

- Fortín de San Gerónimo de Boquerón
- U.S. National Register of Historic Places
- U.S. Historic district – Contributing property
- Puerto Rico Historic Sites and Zones
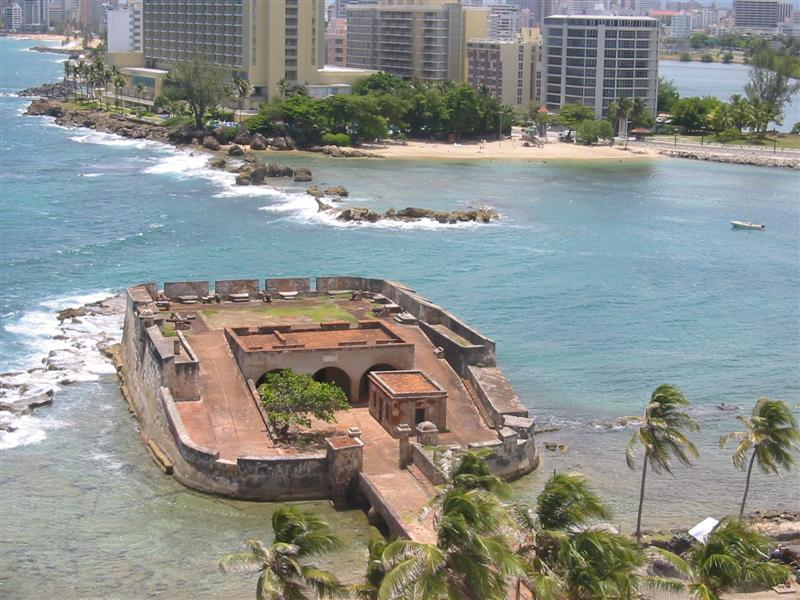
- Fort San Gerónimo picture taken from Caribe Hilton Hotel

- Location within Puerto Rico
- Location: Puerta de Tierra subbarrio, San Juan, Puerto Rico
- Coordinates: 18°27′46″N 66°05′03″W
- Area: 0.4 acres (0.16 ha)
- Built: 1791
- Architect: Juan Francisco Mestre (1791 reconstruction)
- Part of: Línea Avanzada (ID97001136)
- NRHP reference No.: 83004199
- RNSZH No.: 2000-(RMSJ)-00-JP-SH

Significant dates
- Added to NRHP: October 11, 1983
- Designated RNSZH: February 3, 2000

Fortín de San Gerónimo de Boquerón is a small historic fort located at the mouth of the Condado Lagoon in San Juan Islet across from the district of Condado in the barrio of Santurce in San Juan, Puerto Rico.

It was built during the 18th century to replace a smaller battery (called El Boquerón) that stood at the easternmost end of the San Juan islet. The original Boquerón battery was used by the Spanish to defend the city of San Juan from attacks by Sir Francis Drake in 1595 and George Clifford, the third Earl of Cumberland in 1598, who managed to destroy it during his attack. San Gerónimo became part of San Juan's first line of defense, along with the Fortín San Antonio and Escambrón Fort, while the last line of defense was the formidable Castillo San Cristóbal, which guarded the city entrance proper and also defended from land attacks.

== History ==
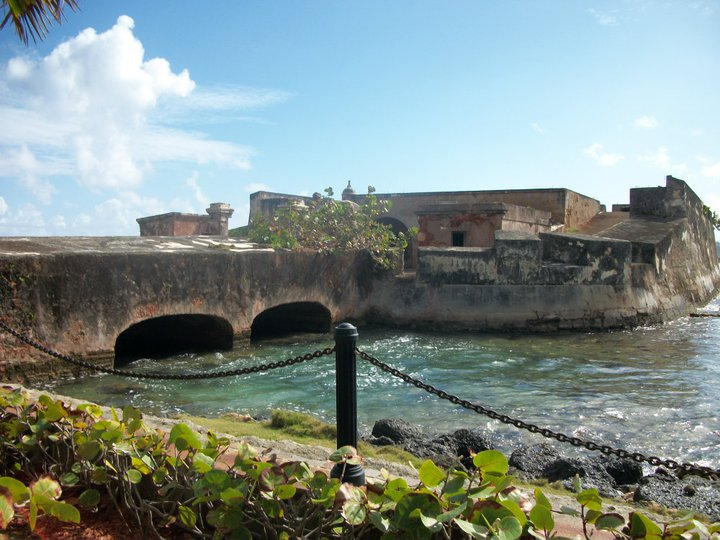
San Gerónimo

The San Gerónimo and San Antonio forts were pivotal in repelling the invasion by the forces of British Admiral Henry Harvey and Sir Ralph Abercromby in 1797. On April 17, 1797, their combined forces (64 to 68 ships and 7,000 to 13,000 men) landed in Cangrejos, approximately three miles west of San Juan. San Juan's military forces, which included, among others, the Regimiento Fijo de Puerto Rico (Resident Regiment of Puerto Rico) and the Militias Disciplinadas (Trained Militias) were outnumbered by the invaders by a ratio of almost three to one. Admiral Harvey blockaded the San Juan Harbor while Abercromby established his operations headquarters in San Mateo parish overseeing all of San Juan and the Martín Peña Bridge. Abercromby's strategy was to take the Martín Peña bridge in order to block Spanish reinforcements from the south and bombard San Gerónimo and San Antonio from Miramar to gain access to and cross the San Antonio Bridge into the San Juan islet. British forces included the Royal Marines, made famous by their later defeat of Napoleon's troops in Egypt. Then-Governor of Puerto Rico Field Marshal Don Ramón de Castro y Gutiérrez, a brilliant strategist, prevented the British from advancing and frustrated their conquest of San Juan.

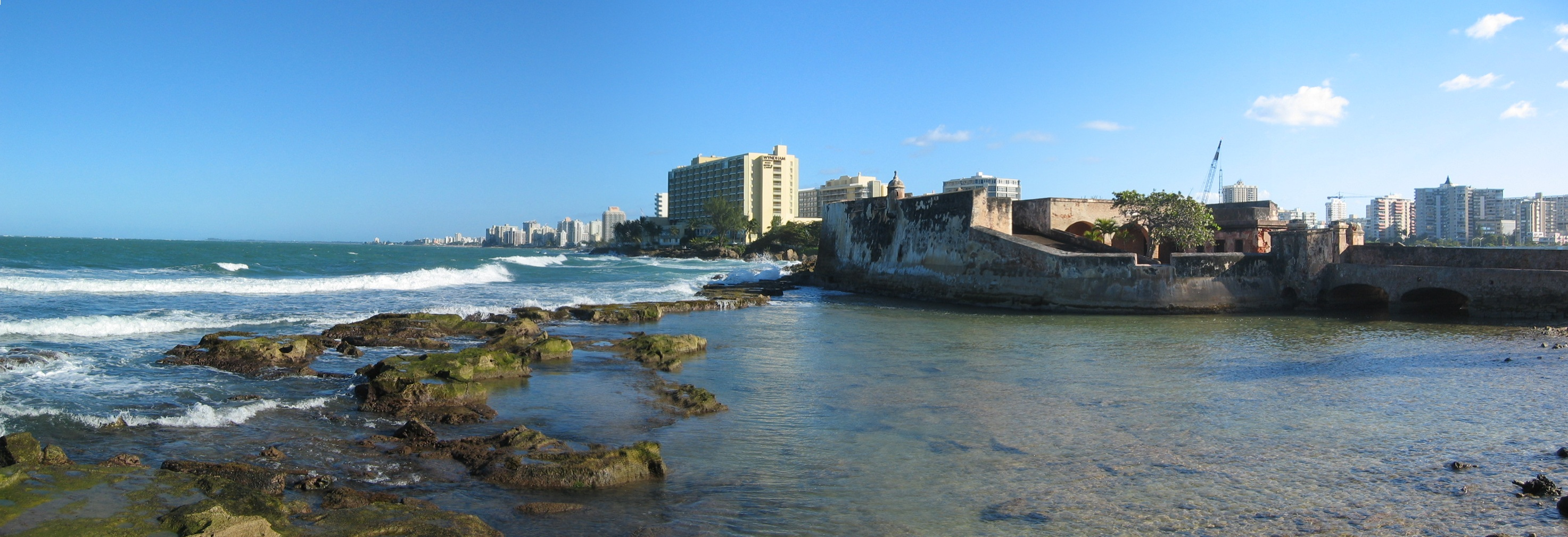
Fort San Gerónimo with El Condado in the background

The San Gerónimo and San Antonio sustained heavy damage from the constant bombardment during the two-week siege on the city. Chronicles describe the defenders shooting their muskets and cannons from behind sandbags because of the devastation their forts sustained. Both San Gerónimo and San Antonio were eventually rebuilt and expanded.

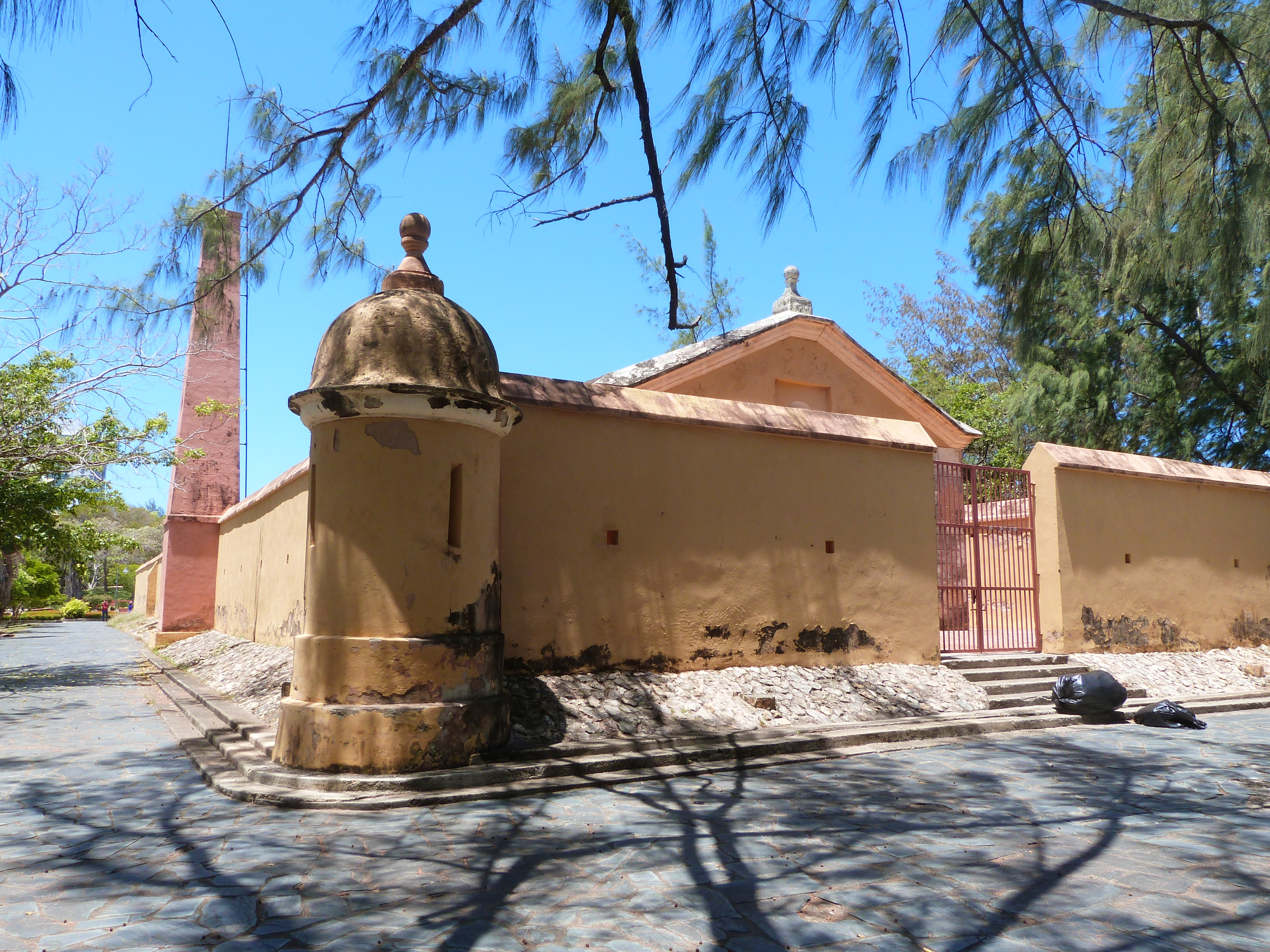
San Gerónimo gunpowder house

San Gerónimo is located adjacent to the grounds of the Caribe Hilton Hotel. It was listed on the National Register of Historic Places on October 11, 1983. Unlike similar forts near Old San Juan, it is not part of San Juan National Historic Site. San Gerónimo is owned by the Institute of Puerto Rican Culture but is managed by the Hilton. Thanks to the work of volunteers, the fort is again open to the public and contains an exhibit of the history of San Juan. The "Polvorín de San Gerónimo", or gunpowder house, that was built in 1769 and supplied the fort with gunpowder, is now part of the Luis Muñoz Rivera Park nearby.

As recent as the year 2006, attempts were being made by the Instituto de Cultura Puertorriqueña and the U.S. Army Corps of Engineers to build a breakwater to stop any further deterioration from irreparably damaging the centuries-old fort. Senate Vice President Orlando Parga has led efforts to modify some of the construction projects that would encroach on the fort or would hamper the Corps of Engineers' preservation and reconstruction efforts.

In July 2007, the Fort was the scene of protests against the construction of a tourist project called Paseo Caribe that would block access to the fortification. Protesters argued that the public should have free access to it. The protest lasted about a week during which the protesters halted the construction projects by climbing onto the cranes.

The Omnibus Public Land Management Act of 2009 directed the U.S. Secretary of the Interior to conduct a study to determine the suitability of including San Gerónimo as part of San Juan National Historic Site.

After two decades closed to the public, in 2018 the Asociación Amigos del Fortín de San Jerónimo was created, a non-profit association that is responsible for the preservation and future reopening for the charity of the Puerto Rican people and tourists.

In 2023, the U.S. House of Representatives passed a bill that would make the Fort an affiliated area of the National Park Service.

== Gallery ==
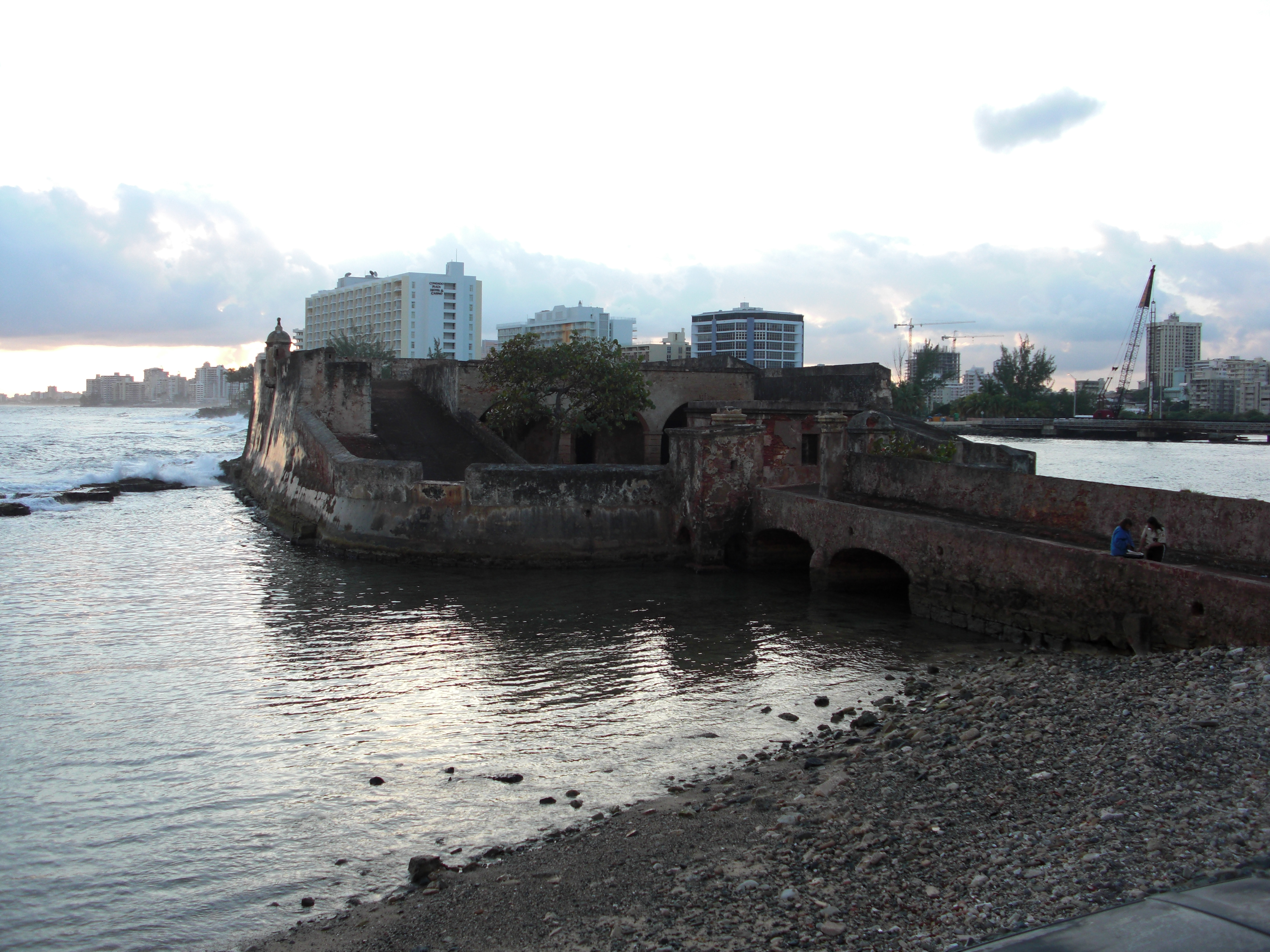

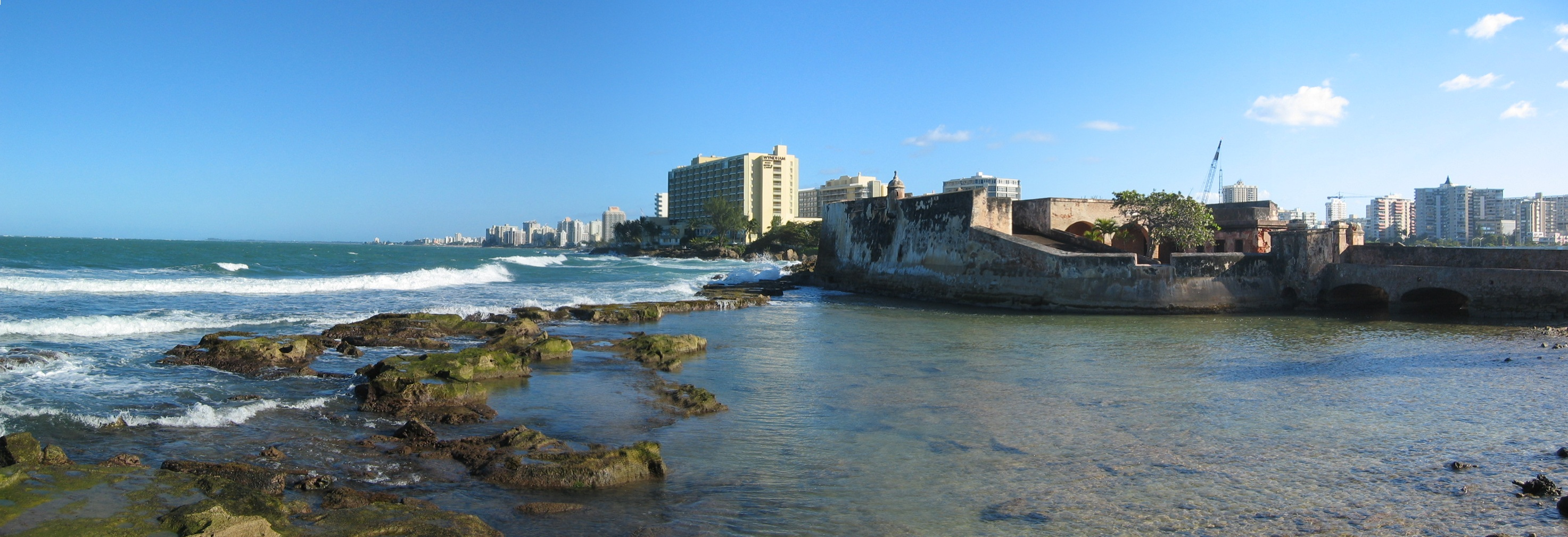
Panoramic view

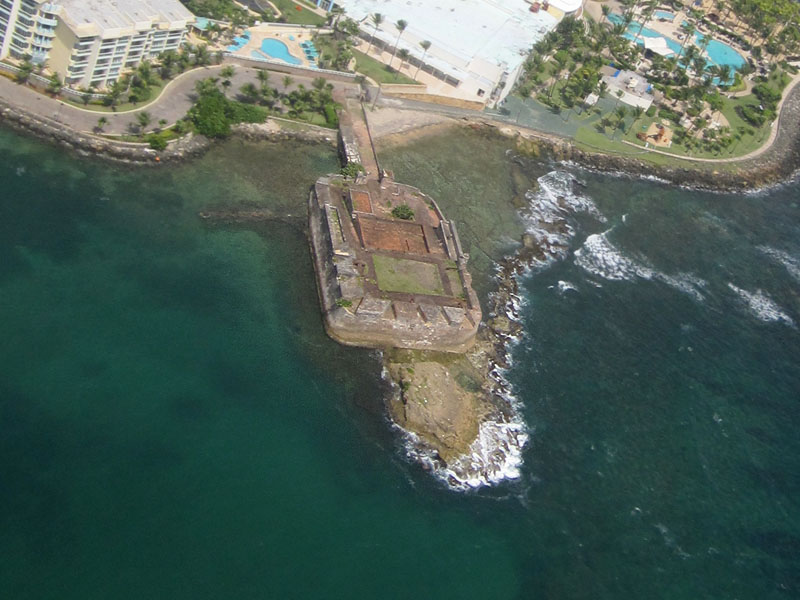
Aerial view

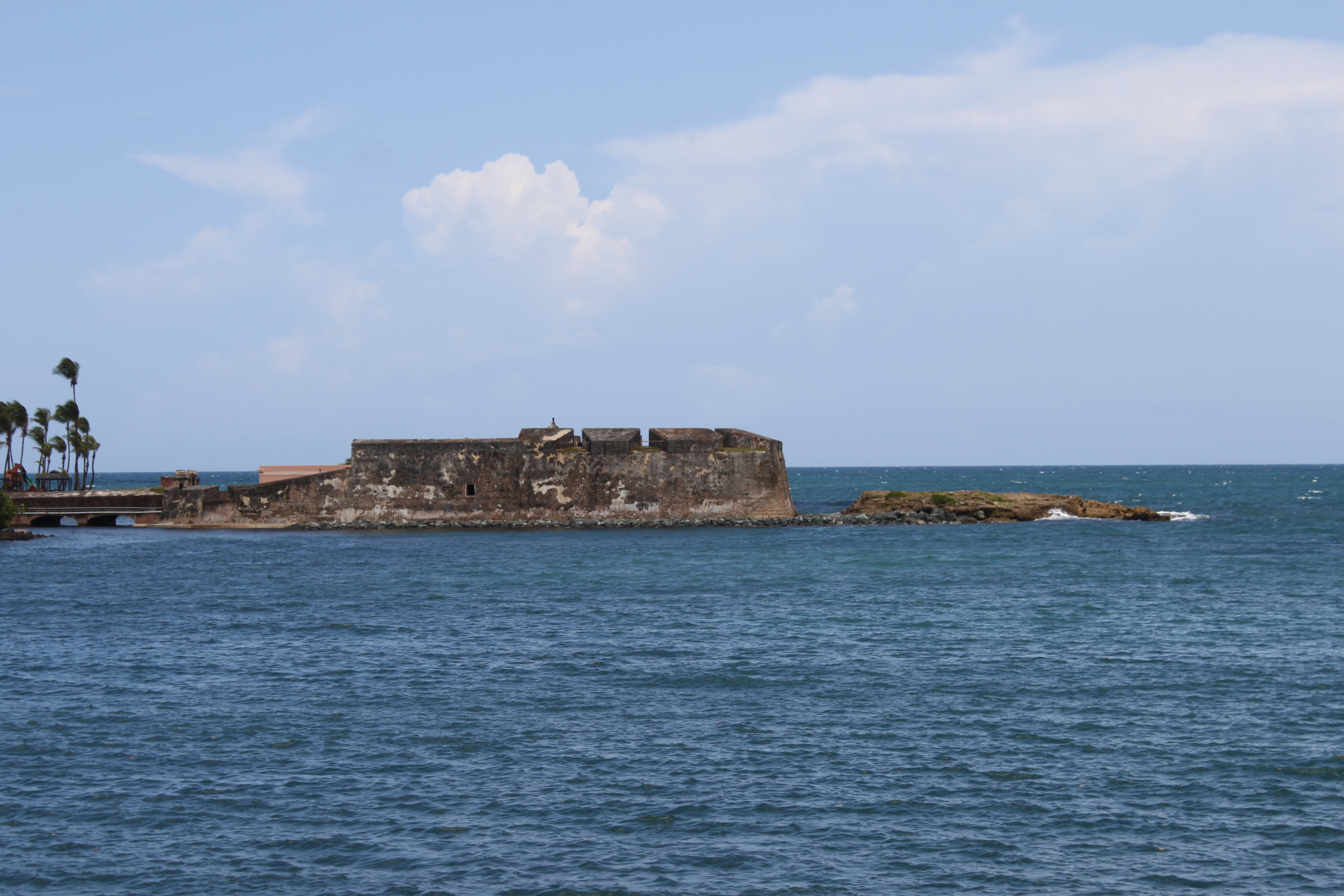
Fortín de San Gerónimo from Ashford Ave Bridge

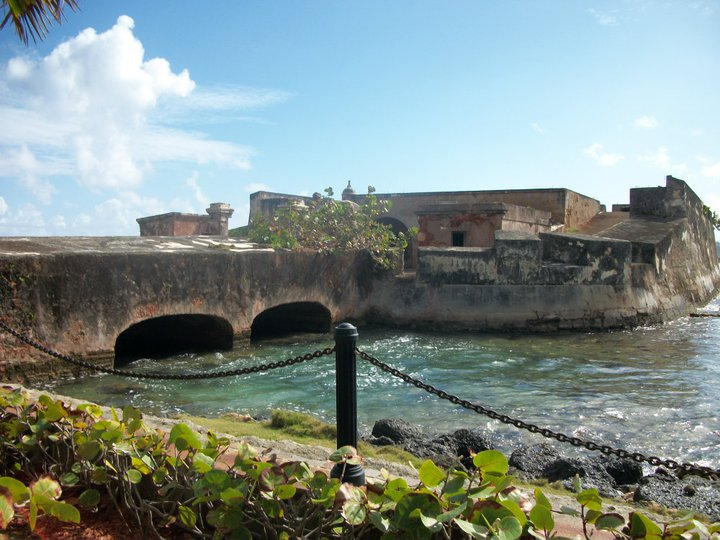

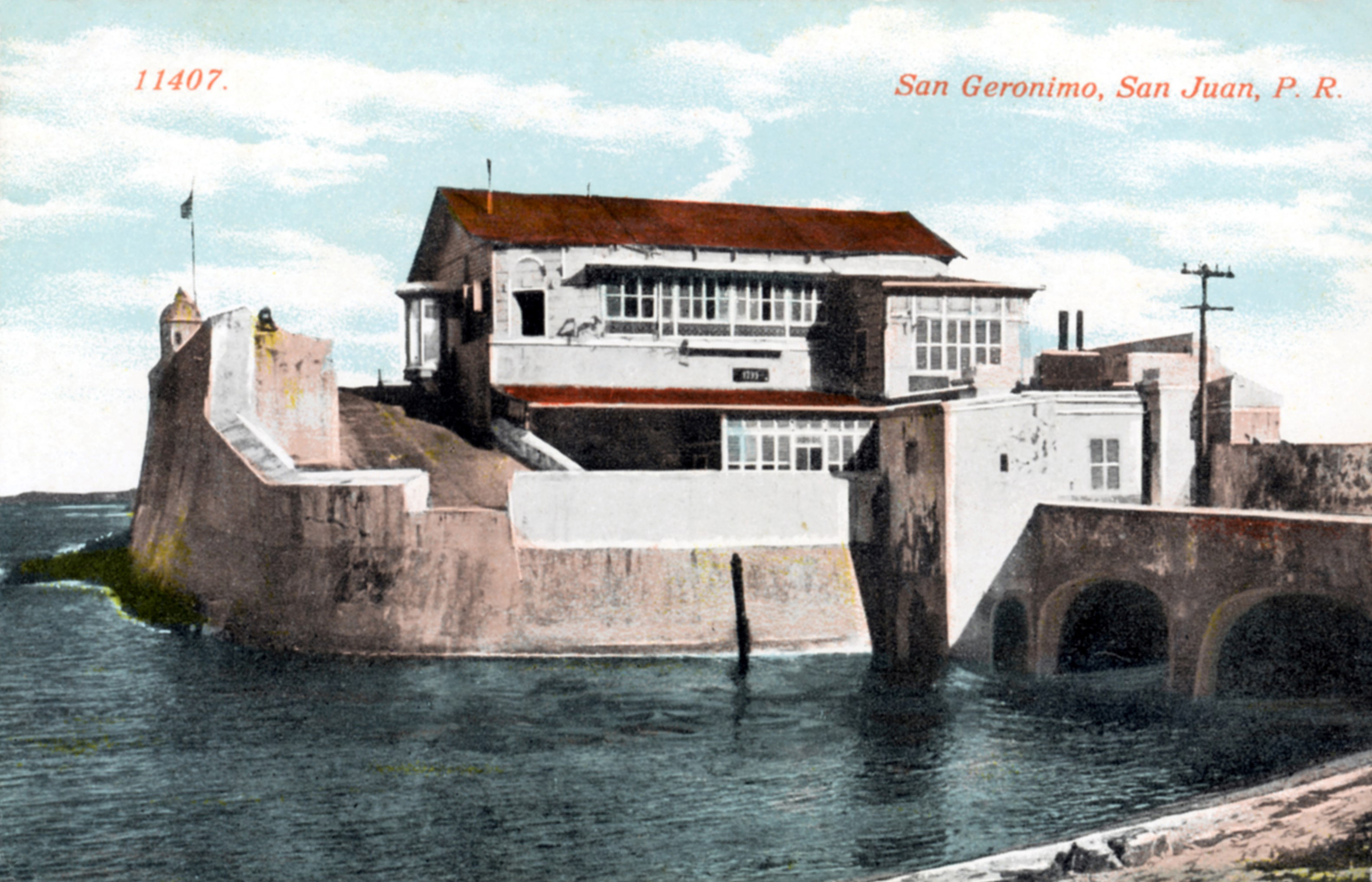
San Gerónimo, circa 1911

== See also ==
- Fuerte de San José
