= El Escambrón Beach =

Beach in Puerto Rico

Coordinates: 18°28′1″N 66°5′24″W

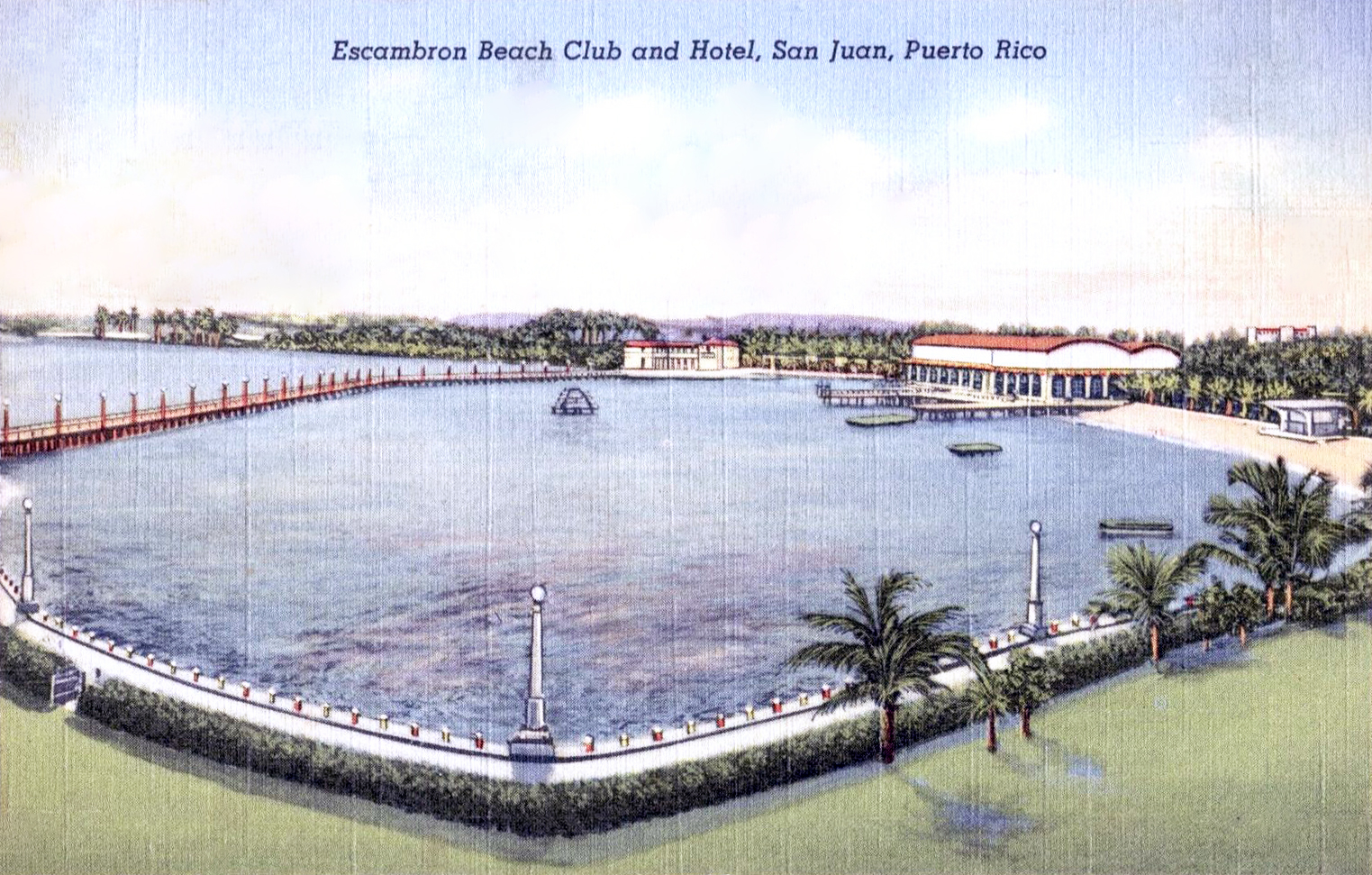
Postcard showing the former Escambrón Beach Club swimming pool circa 1950.

El Escambrón Beach (Spanish: Balneario del Escambrón) is a public-access beach located in the San Juan Antiguo sub-district (subbarrio) of Puerta de Tierra, next to the Luis Muñoz Rivera Park in San Juan, Puerto Rico. The beach and recreational complex are located on the grounds of the former Escambrón Beach Club and Hotel which featured a large swimming pool enclosed by breakwaters. Although the pool no longer exists, the beach is still enclosed by a series of coral reefs and other natural breakwaters, such as the Peñón de San Jorge reef, making it popular for swimmers and families.

In addition to the beach, El Escambrón features a recreational park, the Third Millennium Park (Parque Tercer Milenio), and the ruins of an artillery battery known as the Escambrón Battery (Batería del Escambrón). This battery formed part of a larger military advance line (Línea de Avanzada del Boquerón), a series of military fortifications found along the eastern end of the Islet of San Juan that can still be seen in the form of batteries, gunpowder warehouses and fortresses such as the Fortín de San Gerónimo de Boquerón.

== Gallery ==
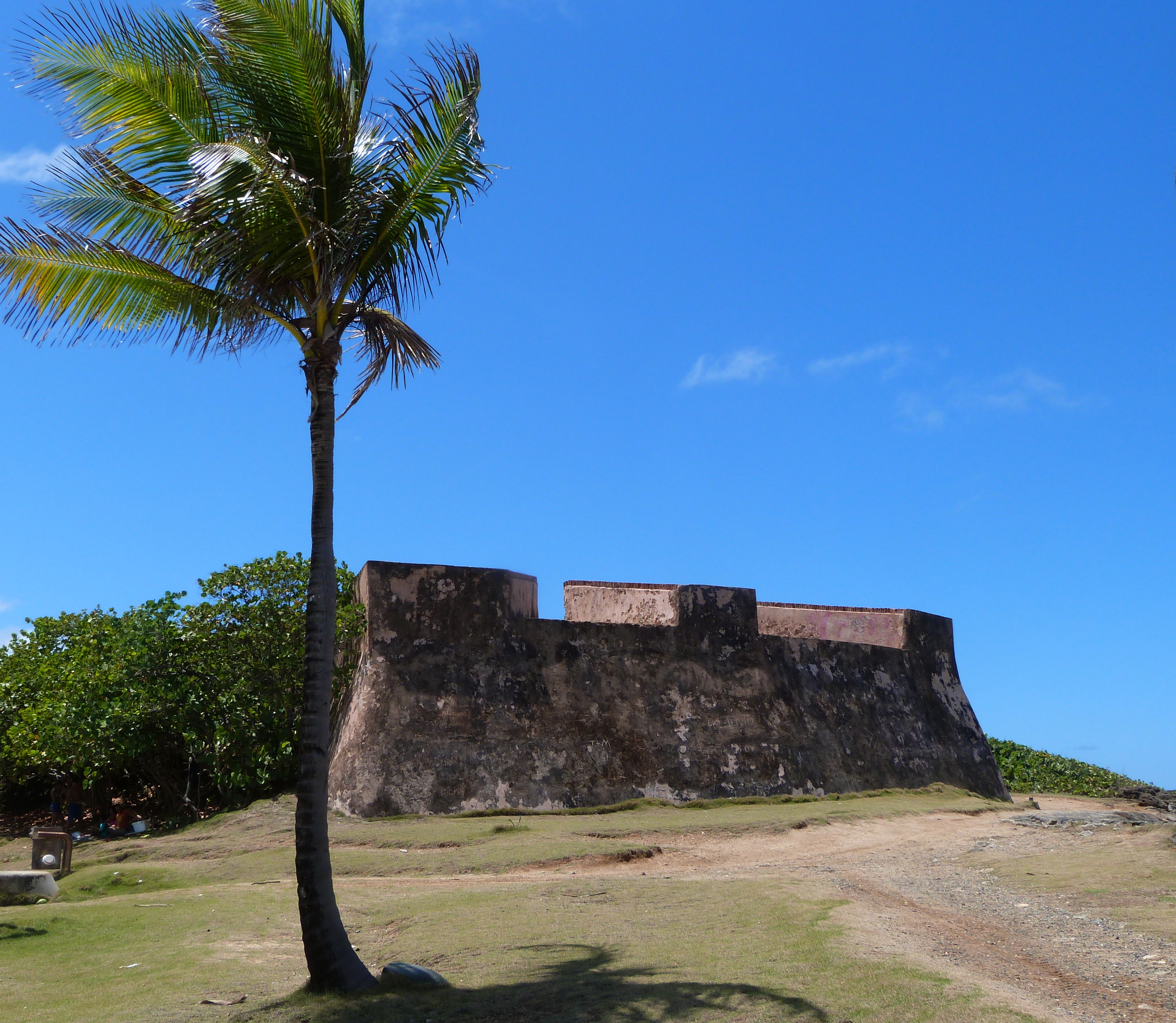
El Escambrón Battery

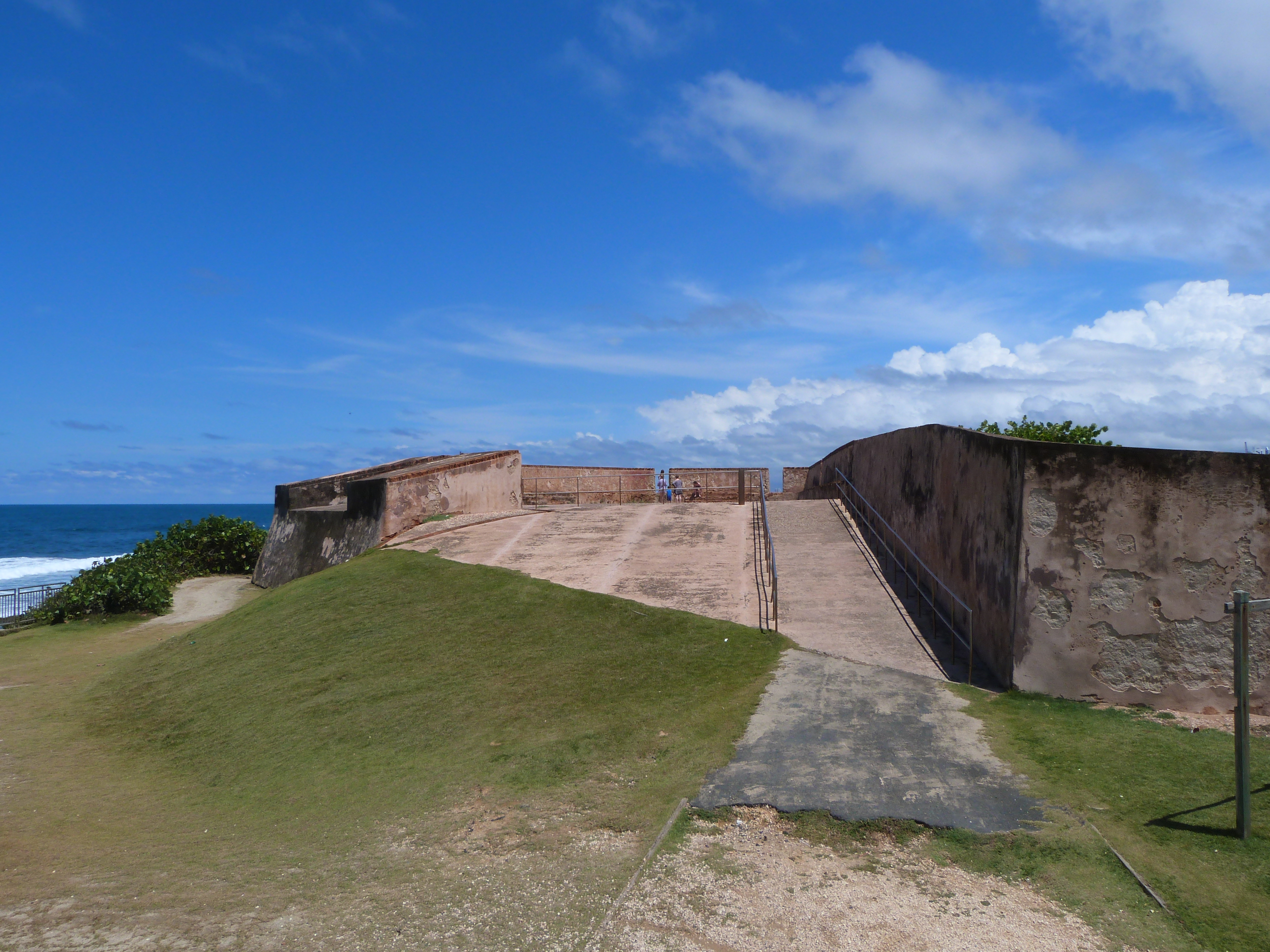
El Escambrón Battery

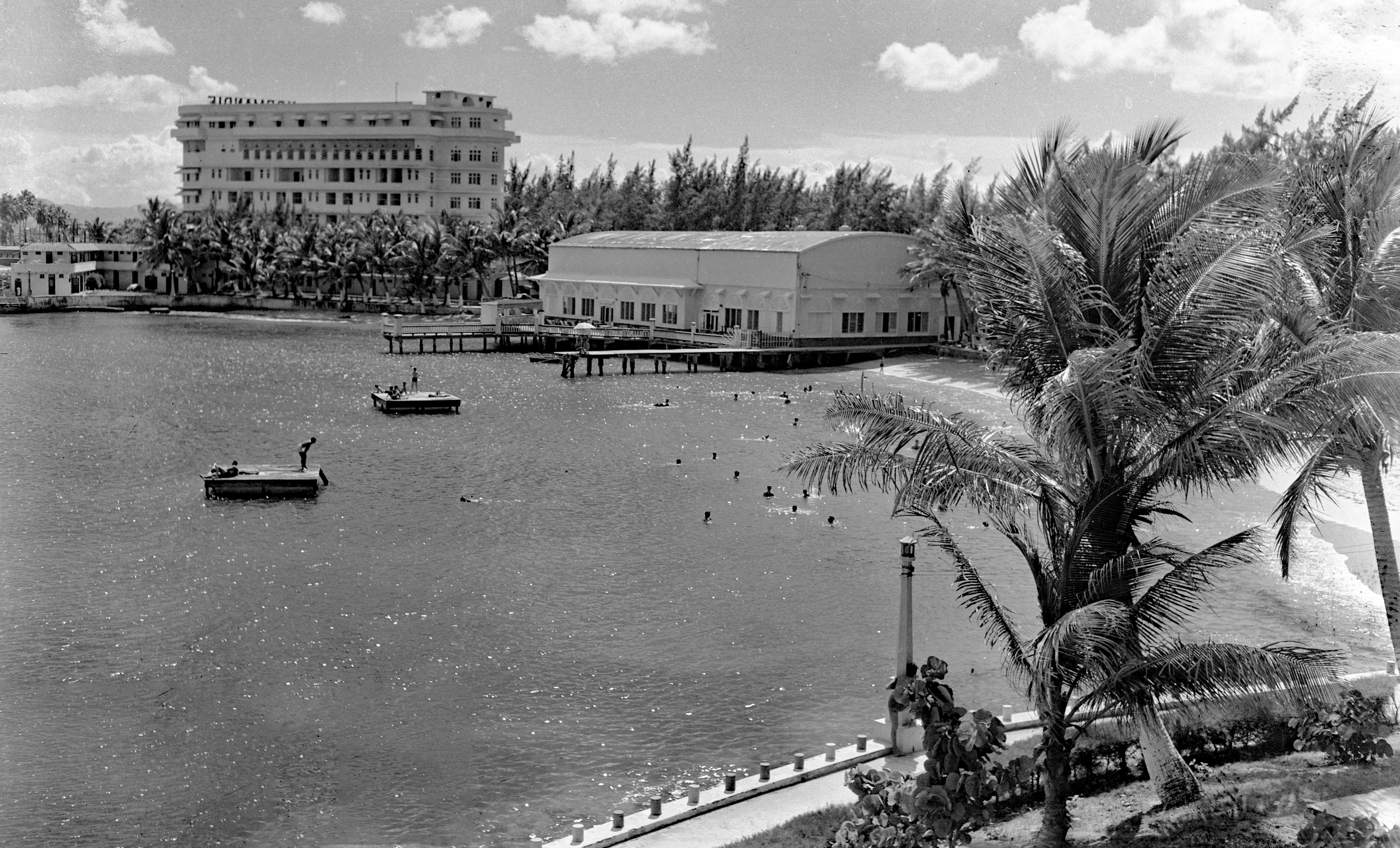
Escambrón Beach Club (1944)

== See also ==
- El Boquerón
- Puerta de Tierra
