= El Batey =

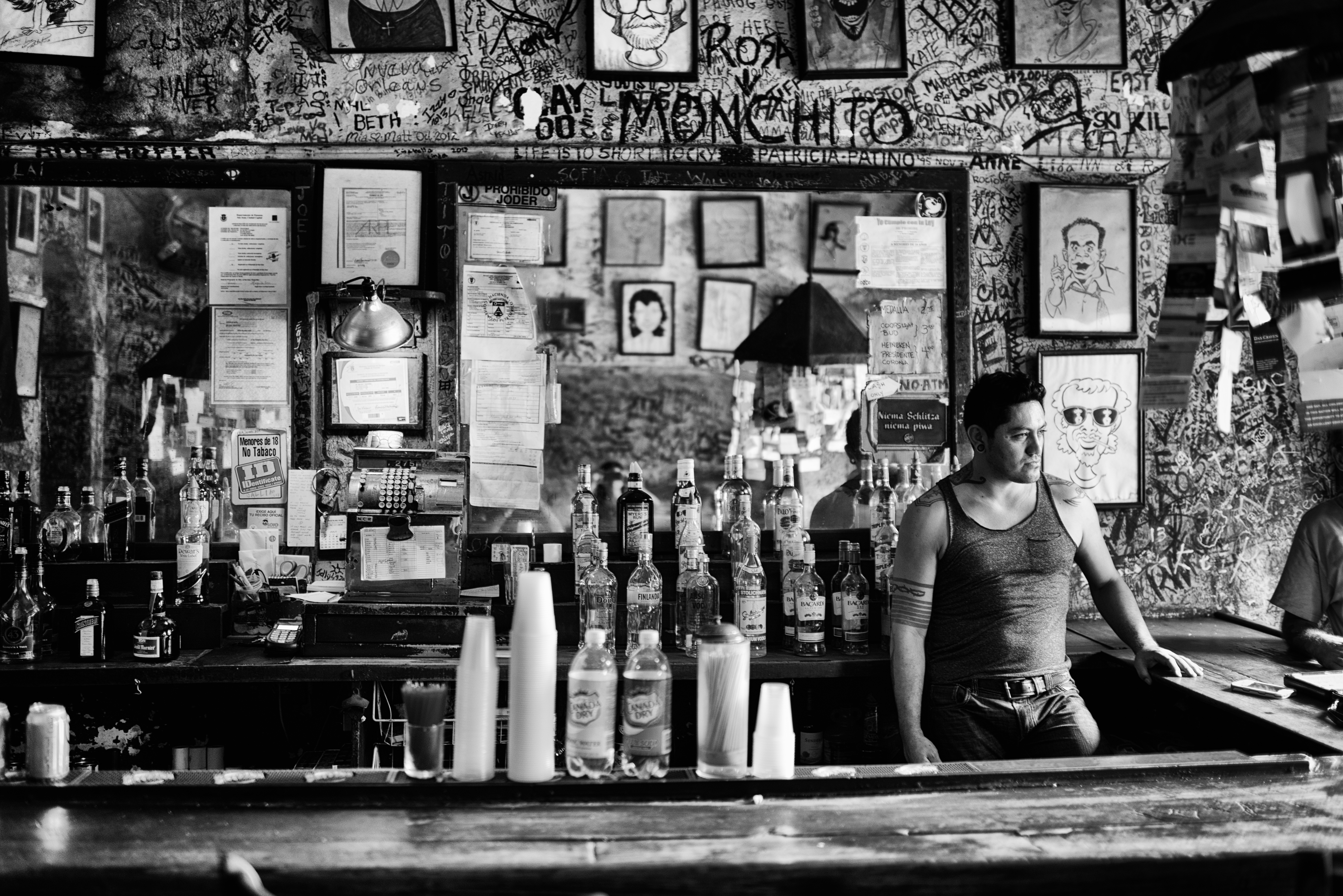
- El Batey in 2013

Restaurant information
- Established: 1961
- Location: 101 Calle del Cristo, San Juan, Puerto Rico, 00901

El Batey is a bar located on Calle del Cristo in Old San Juan, Puerto Rico, housed in an 18th-century Spanish colonial building. Established in 1961, it is characterized by its graffiti-covered walls, informal atmosphere, and focus on beer and rum-based drinks.

== Description ==
El Batey is a bar situated on Calle del Cristo in Old San Juan, Puerto Rico. It occupies an 18th-century Spanish colonial building directly across from the Hotel El Convento. The structure features a red brick exterior, rectangular doors, and sidewalk-level windows protected by iron bars. A simple white overhang extends above the entrance. Inside, the layout includes a main bar area, a side room with tables, and a small interior patio. The walls are densely covered with signatures and graffiti left by visitors, and the decor includes a non-functioning jukebox and mismatched tiles.

The establishment is characterized by its dim lighting, loud music, and framed photographs commemorating former regulars. Additional features include dollar bills pinned to lamps and a pool table for patrons.

=== Menu ===
The bar specializes in beer and rum-based drinks. Offerings include the El Batey-style Cuba Libre, a variation of the traditional cocktail with a stronger rum-to-cola ratio. Medalla Light beer and Don Q rum are also commonly served. In recent years, a written menu has been introduced, listing cocktails such as the Rum old fashioned, made with Ron del Barrilito rum, and La Guagua Voladora, a sour cocktail featuring Averna and Campari. Payments are processed using a vintage cash register, as the bar does not accept credit cards.

== History ==
El Batey was established in 1961 and has remained operational since its inception. The term Batey is derived from the Taíno language, referring to the central plaza in Taíno settlements. These plazas were often used for gatherings, celebrations, and games. In 1966, David Jones, a former U.S. Navy sailor, became its owner and managed it until his death in 2015. During his tenure, the bar became known for its distinctive ambiance and the tradition of patrons leaving graffiti on its walls.

In the 1960s and 1970s, the bar attracted both locals and tourists, including members of The Rolling Stones. Its atmosphere provided an alternative to mainstream nightlife and established its reputation as a gathering spot for those seeking a unique experience.

After Jones' death, the bar faced challenges, including Hurricane Maria in 2017 and an extended closure due to the COVID-19 pandemic in Puerto Rico. In 2017, Jones’ daughters enlisted Mario Seijo, a bartender with previous ties to El Batey, to manage the establishment. Seijo and his partner, Bianca Declet, took over operations and aimed to preserve the bar's character. The pandemic caused a 14-month closure, but the bar eventually reopened with a new team.

== Reception ==
El Batey is noted for its unconventional atmosphere and historical significance. Its graffiti-covered walls, absence of modern amenities, and loud music appeal to those seeking a non-traditional nightlife experience. Some visitors may find its decor sparse. Others appreciate its role as a reflection of Old San Juan's cultural heritage.
