= Pablo Casals Museum =

Museum in Puerto Rico

Coordinates: 18°27′57″N 66°07′10″W

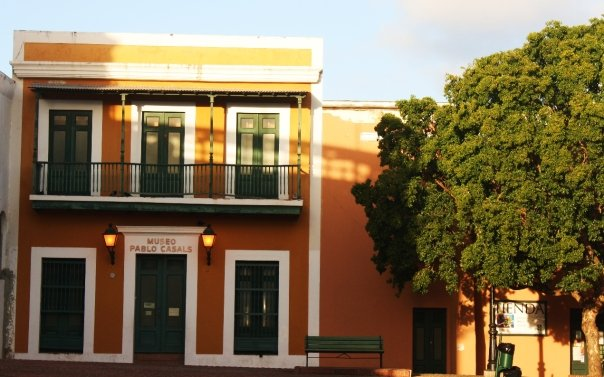
Pablo Casals Museum near the Church of San José

The Pablo Casals Museum (Spanish: Museo Pablo Casals), located on San José Square in Old San Juan, San Juan, Puerto Rico, is a museum dedicated to the Catalan Puerto Rican cellist, composer and conductor Pablo Casals, who lived the last 17 years of his life in San Juan where he composed his masterpiece El Pessebre. In addition to his piano, his cello, historical photographs, some of his musical instruments and personal belongings, the museum also has a media and music library which visitors can browse.

== See also ==
- Old San Juan
