= Santa Ana Church (San Juan) =

Church in San Juan, Puerto Rico

Coordinates: 18°27′52″N 66°6′56″W

- U.S. Historic district – Contributing property
- U.S. National Historic Landmark District – Contributing property
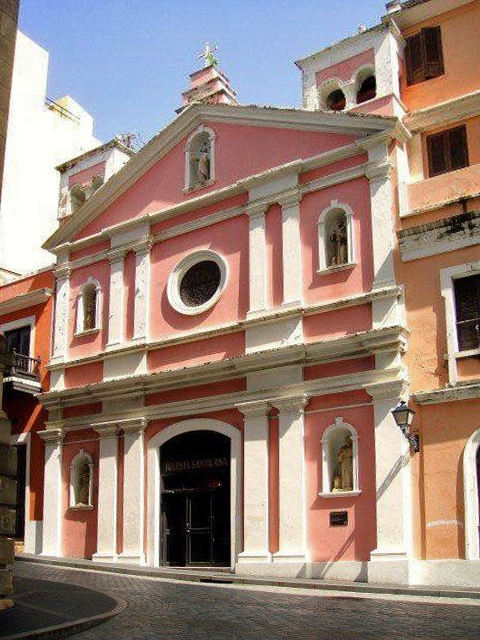
- Location: San Juan Antiguo, San Juan, Puerto Rico
- Built: 17th century
- Part of: Old San Juan Historic District (ID72001553 & ID13000284)

Significant dates
- Designated CP: October 10, 1972
- Designated NHLDCP: February 27, 2013

Santa Ana Church (Spanish: Iglesia de Santa Ana), popularly known as Capilla de Santa Ana, is a historic 17th century Catholic church located in Old San Juan, Puerto Rico.

This often-missed church is located on Tetuan Street close to the Art Deco-style Banco Popular building. The church, one of the oldest in San Juan, is famous for its pink color, simple yet elegant interior design and its arches. According to historian Maria de los Angeles Castro the church might have been decorated with frescoes created by renown 18th century artist José Campeche. The church is open to visitors and still hosts religious services.

== See also ==
- San Juan Cathedral
- San José Church
