= Old San Juan =

Historic district of San Juan, Puerto Rico

Old San Juan Viejo San Juan San Juan Bautista de Puerto Rico
- Historic district
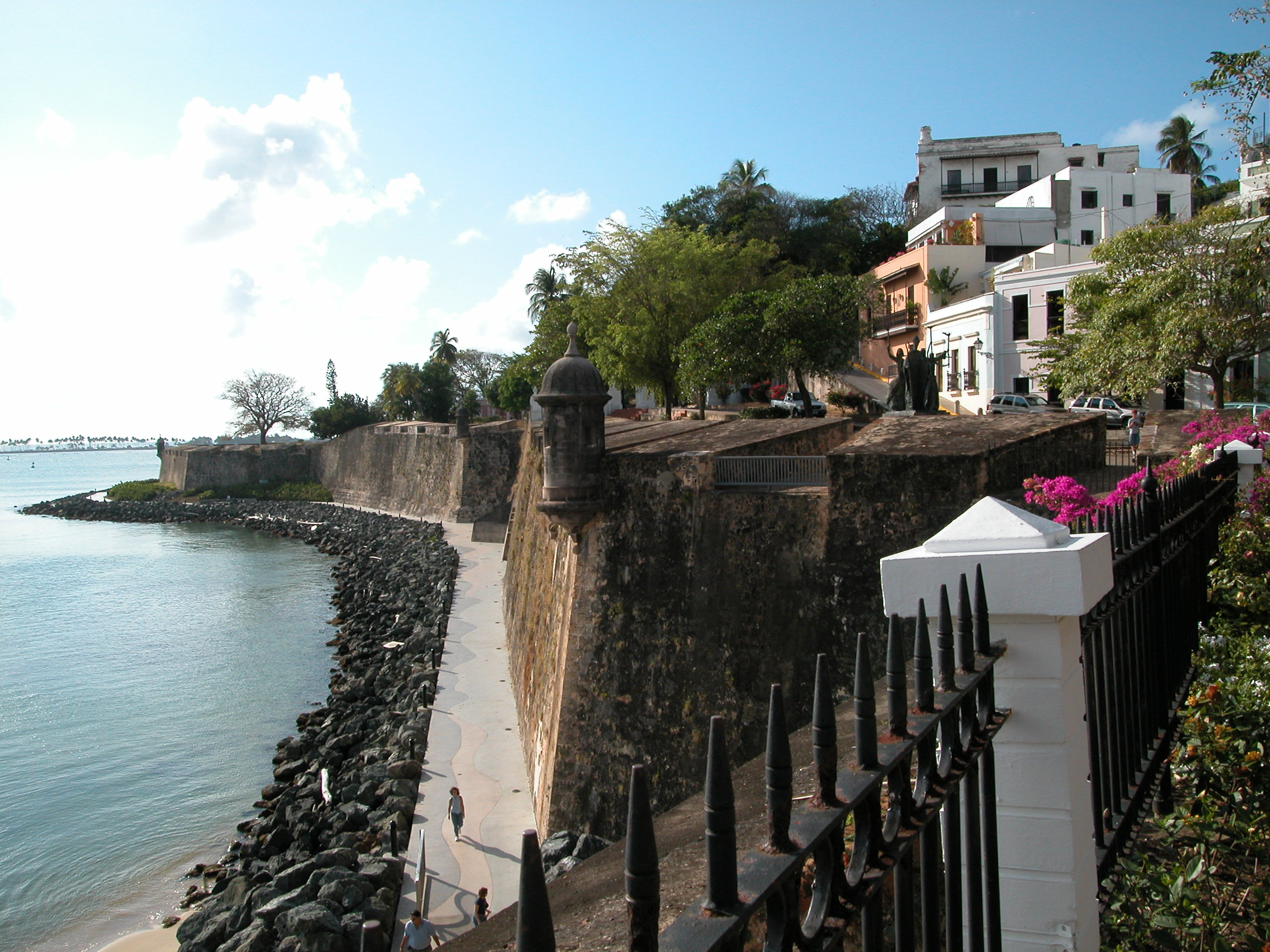
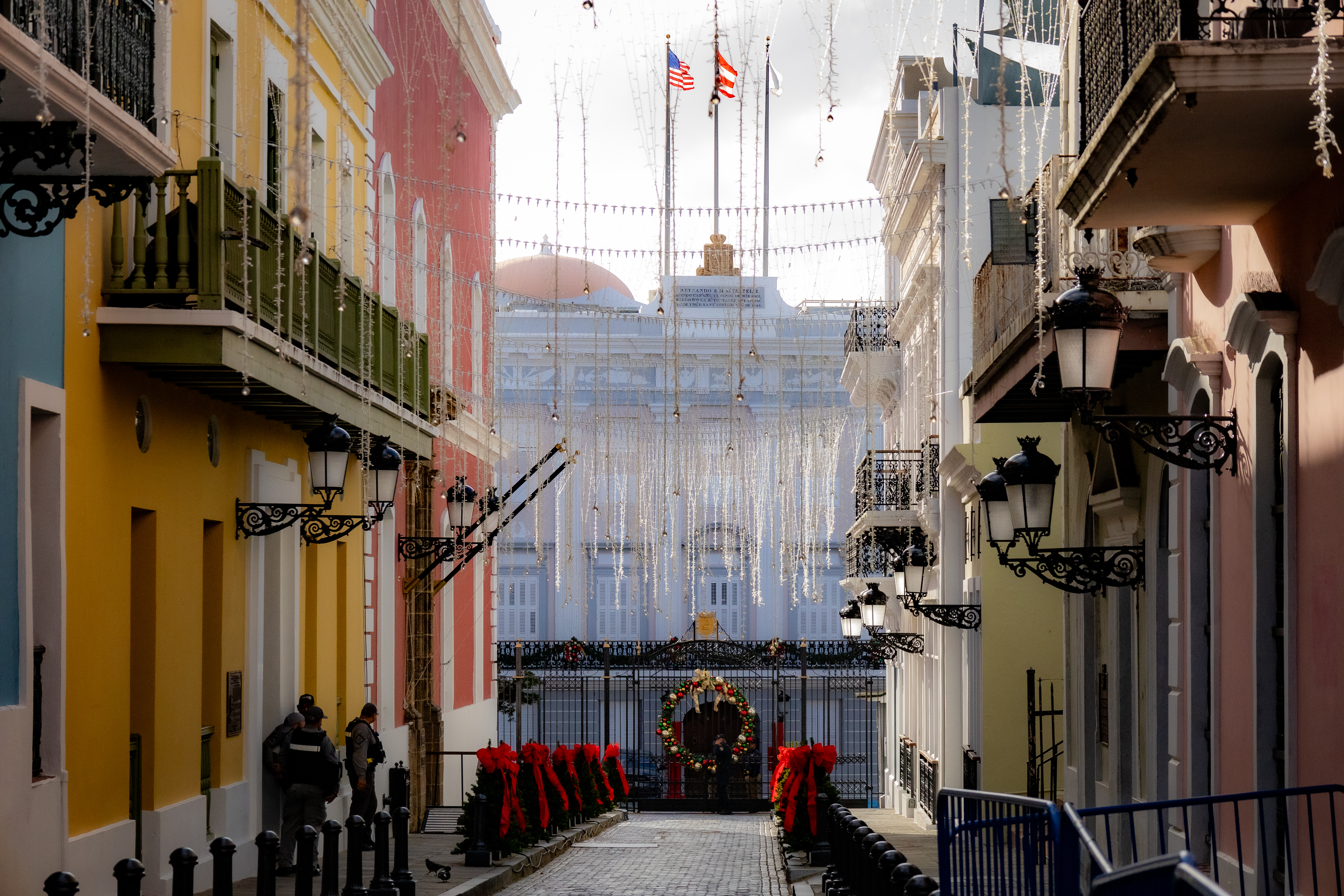
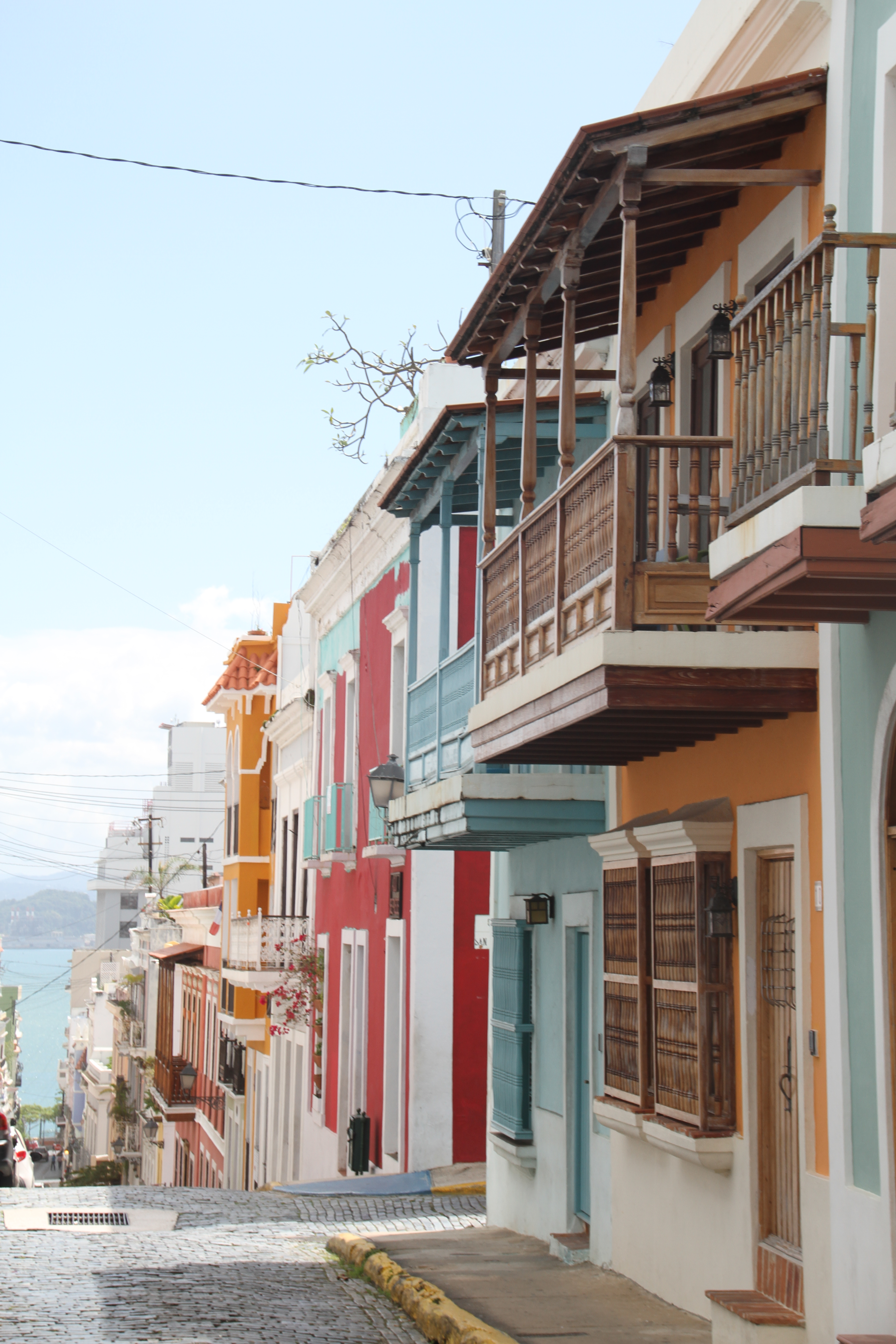
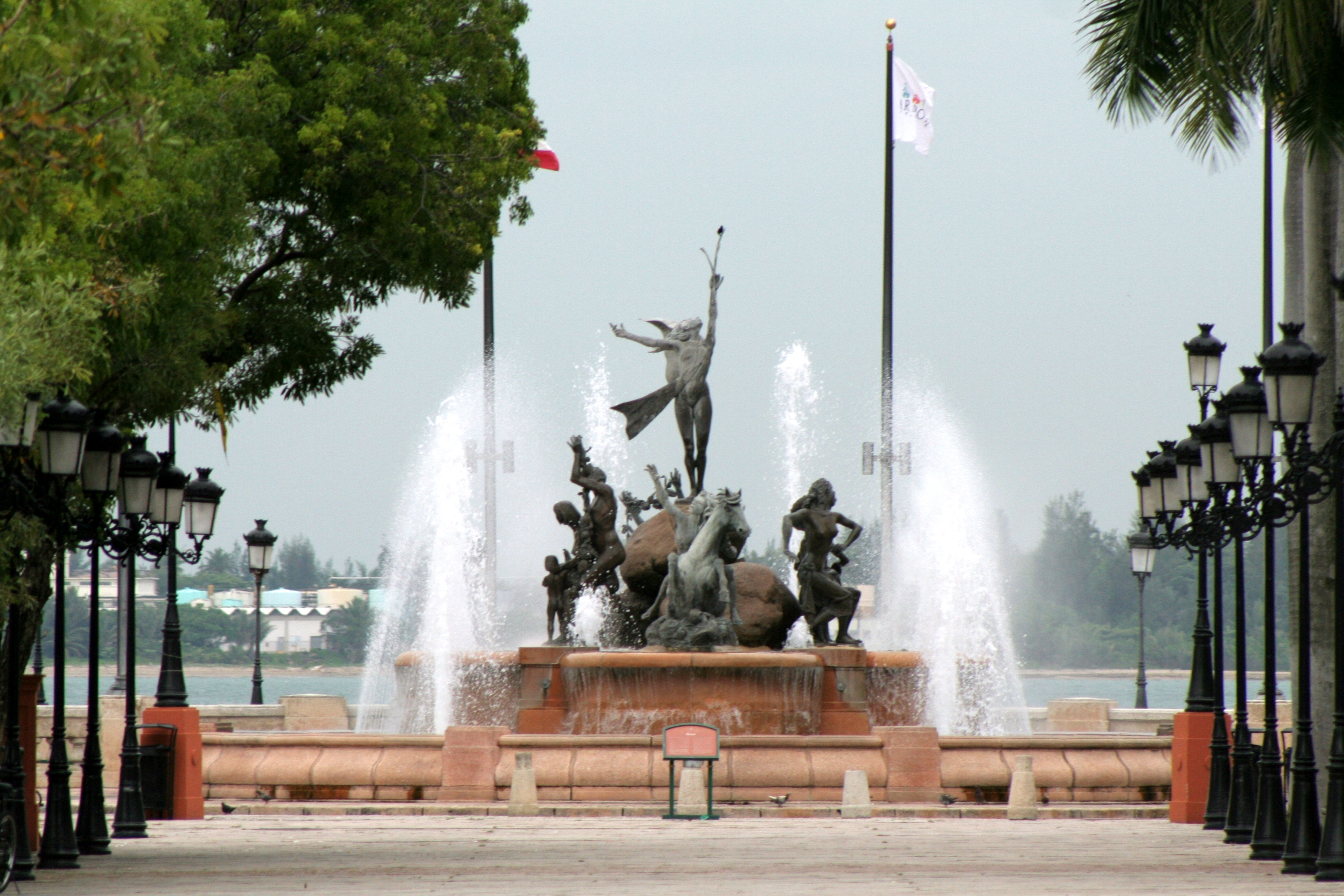
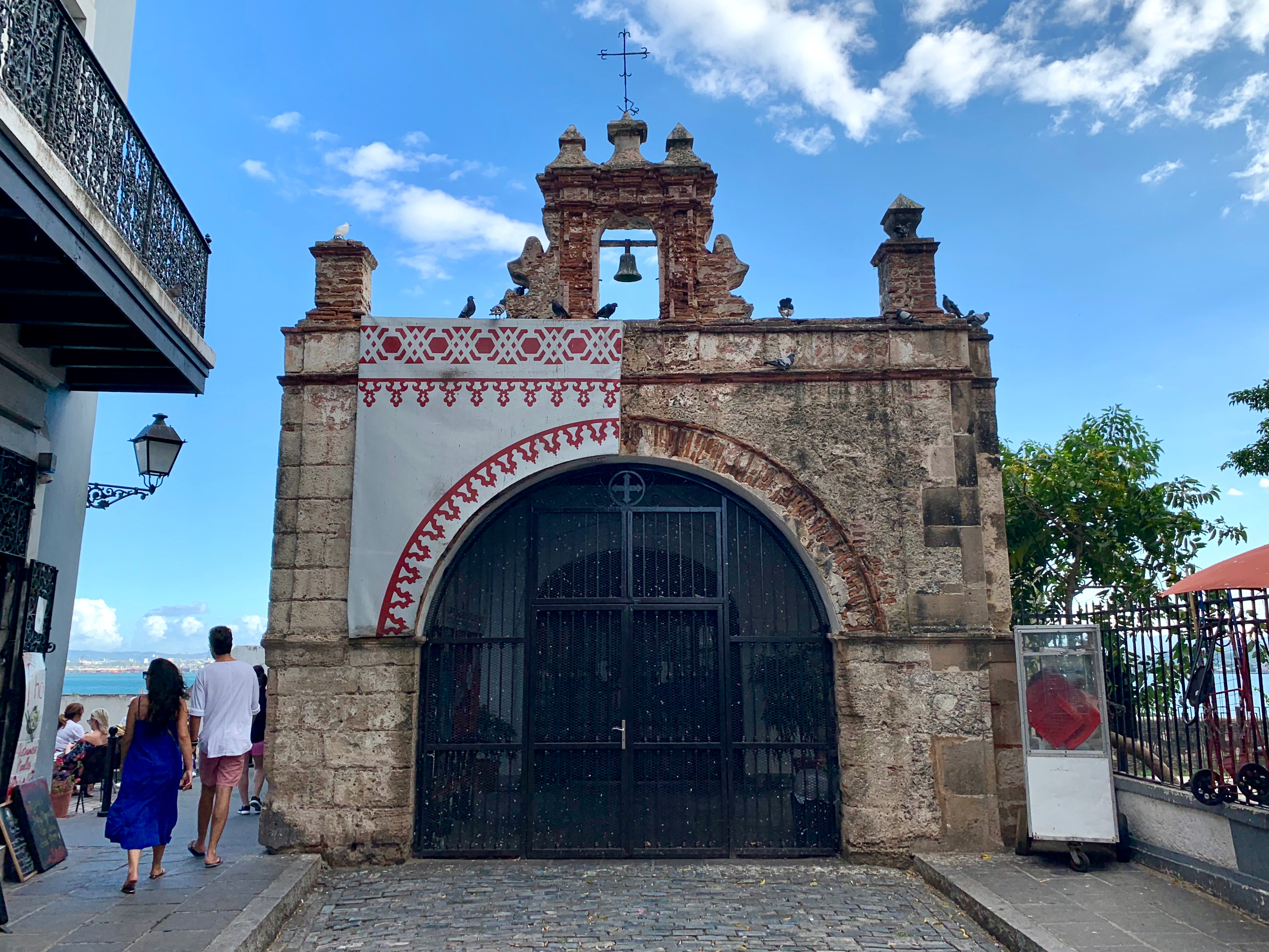
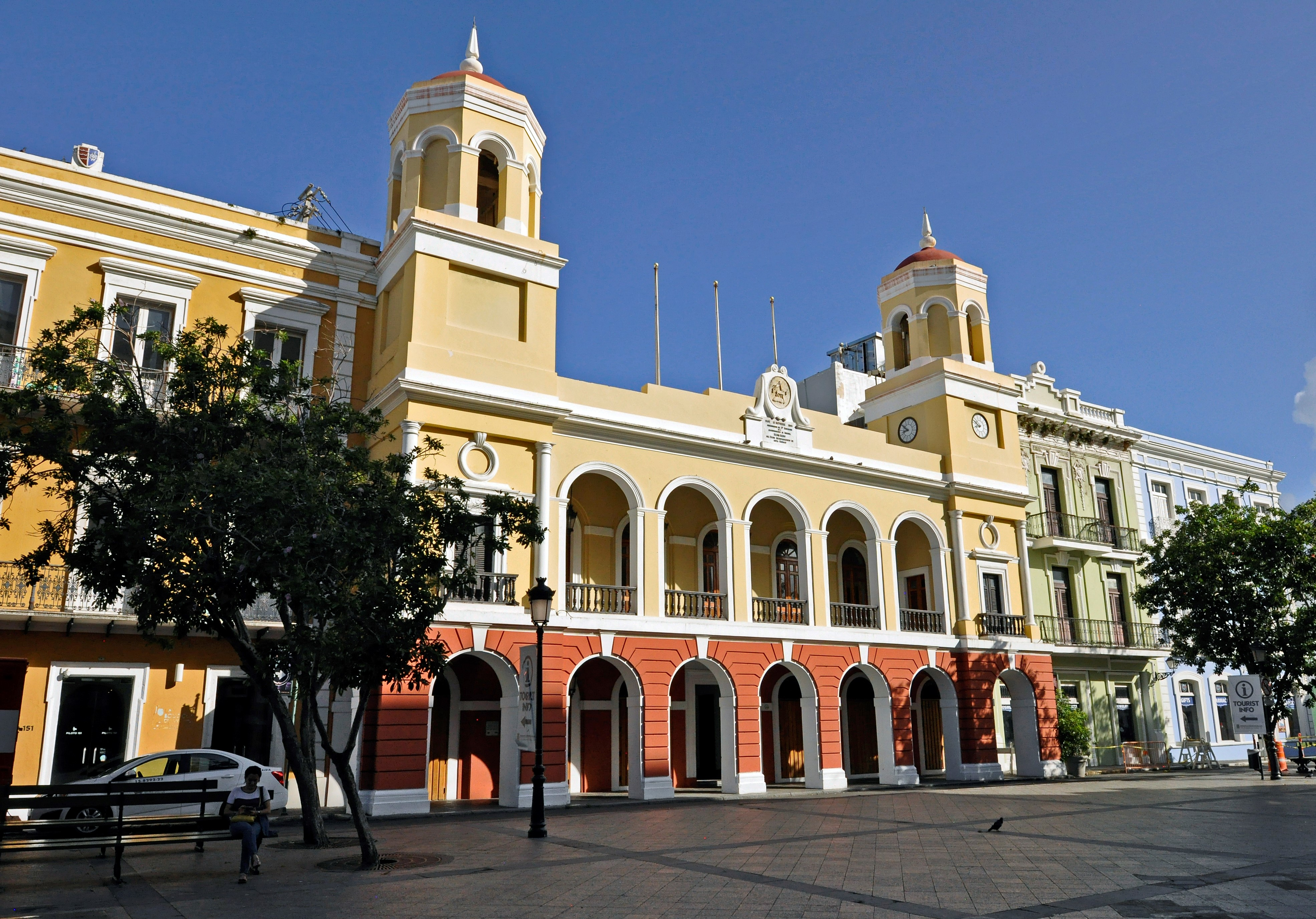
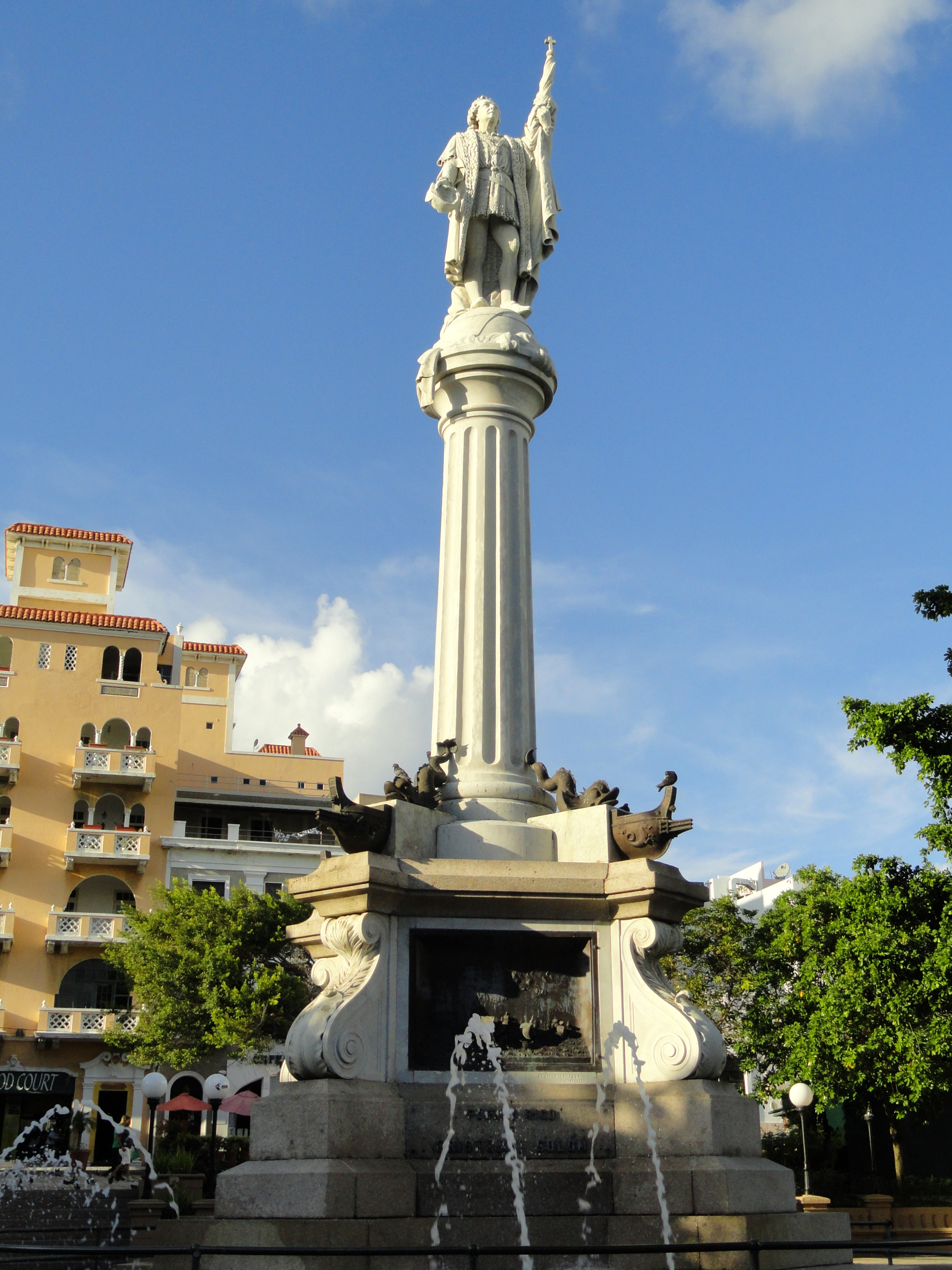
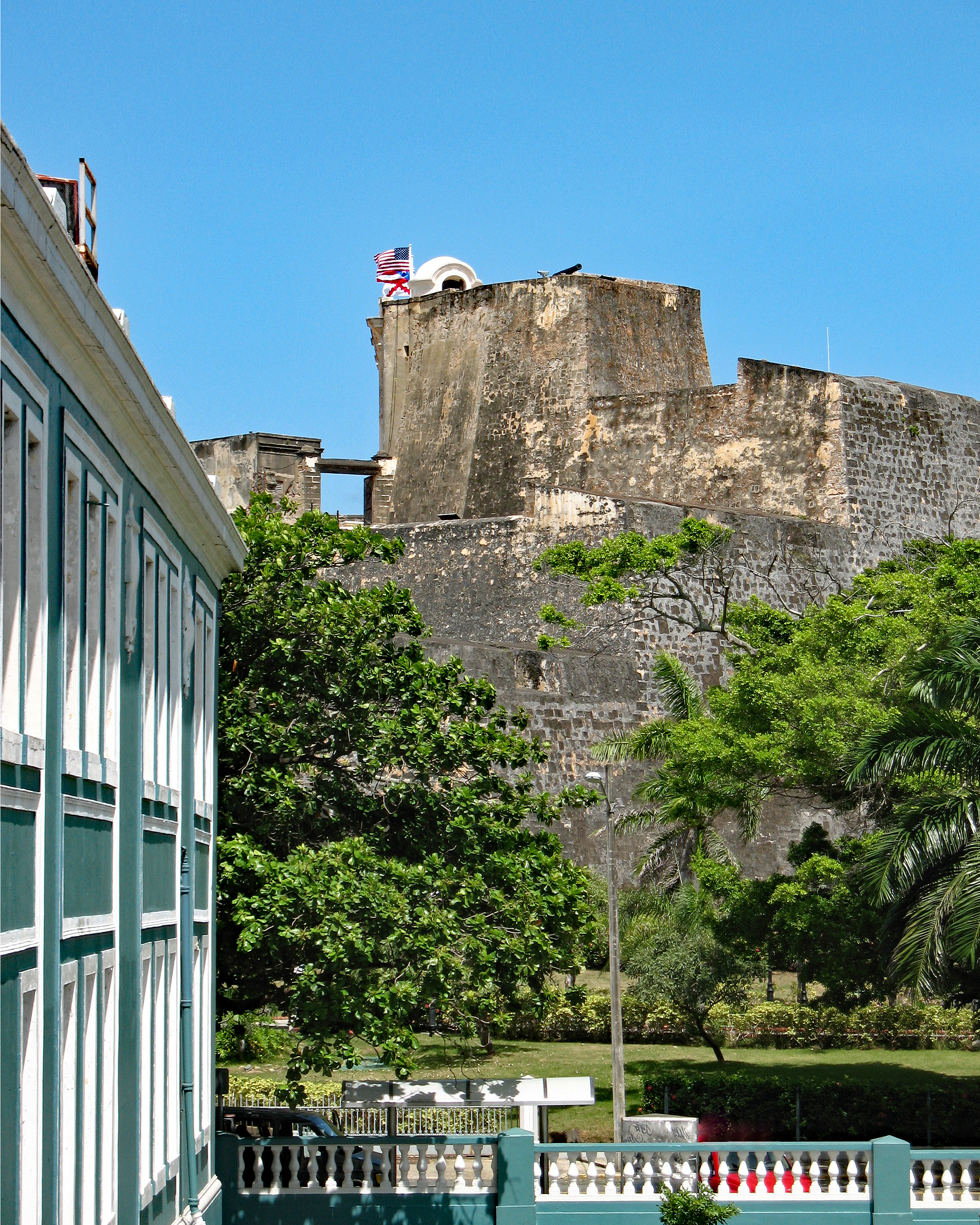
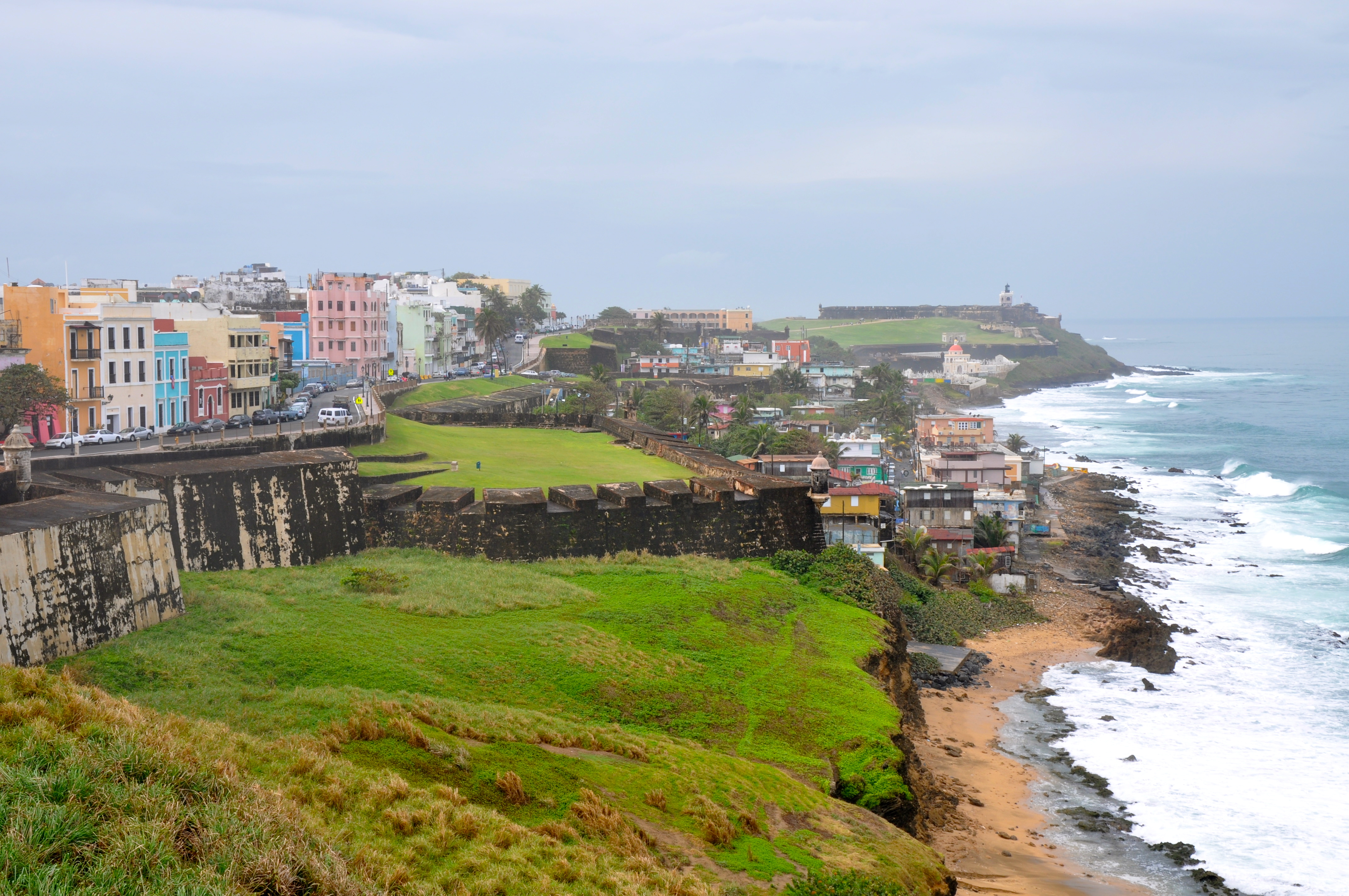
- From top, left to right: Old San Juan from El Morro fortress; Morro Promenade below La Rogativa Square and Casa Blanca; Western-central Wall of Old San Juan; San Juan Gate; Las Monjas alleyway with Cathedral of San Juan and Cathedral Square; La Fortaleza Street with La Fortaleza; San Justo Street; Southwestern Old San Juan with Old San Juan Cruise Port, Raíces Fountain on La Princesa Promenade; Capilla Alleyway; Capilla del Cristo; Narrow House; El Sol Street; San Juan City Hall on Armas Square; Columbus statue on Columbus Square; Puerto Rico flag on Imperial Street; Juan Ponce de León statue and San José Church on San José Square, and Totem on Quinto Centenario Square; Southeastern Old San Juan with Casino Antiguo and Tapia Theater; San Cristóbal fortress; northern Wall of Old San Juan next to La Perla; and Old San Juan from San Juan Bay
- Nickname(s): Ciudad Amurallada (Walled City); Llave de las Indias (Key to the Indies); Ciudad de Puerto Rico (Rich Port City)
- Satellite view of Old San Juan (top center) within western San Juan Islet in northern San Juan, 2016
- Interactive map of Old San Juan
- Coordinates: 18°27′58″N 66°6′59″W
- Commonwealth: Puerto Rico
- Municipality: San Juan
- Established: July 20, 1521
- Subdistricts: Show: Ballajá Catedral Marina Mercado San Cristóbal San Francisco
- Website: www.sanjuan.pr

UNESCO World Heritage Site
- Official name: La Fortaleza and San Juan National Historic Site in Puerto Rico
- Type: Cultural
- Criteria: vi
- Designated: 1983 (7th session)
- Reference no.: 266
- Region: The Americas
- Old San Juan Historic District
- U.S. National Register of Historic Places
- U.S. Historic district
- U.S. National Historic Landmark District
- Area: Northwest triangle of San Juan Islet
- Former name: San Juan Historic Zone
- NRHP reference No.: 66000930 (original); 72001553 (expansion); 12000465 (expansion); 13000284 (landmark district)

Significant dates
- Added to NRHP: October 15, 1966
- Boundary increases: October 10, 1972; July 30, 2012
- Designated NHLD: February 27, 2013

Old San Juan (Spanish: Viejo San Juan) is a historic district preserving the original boundary and cityscape of San Juan, the capital city and municipality of Puerto Rico, first established by the Spanish Empire during the Age of Discovery and Sail in 1521. Located in the northeast of the main island on the western end of San Juan Islet within the San Juan Antiguo barrio, bounded by the Atlantic Ocean to the north, San Juan Bay to the west and south, and Puerta de Tierra district to the east, 2 to 7 miles (3.2 to 11.3 km) west of the Hato Rey business center, Condado and Isla Verde resort areas, and SJU airport, Old San Juan functions as a historical, cultural, commercial, and residential area covering six subdistricts, namely Ballajá, Catedral, Mercado, San Cristóbal, San Francisco, and Marina. It is a U.S. National Historic Landmark District, and partially a U.S. National Historic Site and UNESCO World Heritage Site.

In 1521, the Spanish Empire founded Old San Juan under the name of San Juan Bautista de Puerto Rico on the headland of San Juan Islet at the outermost part of San Juan Bay as the colonial capital city of the island possession christened San Juan Bautista or San Juan by explorer Christopher Columbus during his second voyage in 1493. It came after the strategic abandonment of Caparra or Puerto Rico, the original settlement established by conquistador Juan Ponce de León on a flatland surrounded by swamps and mogotes in the main island at the innermost part of the bay, today within the Pueblo Viejo barrio of the Guaynabo municipality, in 1508. For the next 400 years, it remained the political and economic center of Puerto Rico until these roles began to be dispersed into the rest of the San Juan Antiguo barrio, namely the adjacent Puerta de Tierra historic district, and the nearby Santurce barrio within an expanded San Juan municipality in 1930.

Following the natural contours of San Juan Islet, gradually rising from sea level along its southern coastline to elevations of about 50 to 100 feet (15 to 30 m) along its western and northern coastlines, Old San Juan primarily comprises the walled colonial city. Covering approximately 2,687,318 square feet (249,660.0 m^{2}), the city consists of narrow, flat and sloping, mostly cobblestoned streets and alleyways arranged in an orthogonal grid densely-packed with 74 rectangular city blocks of various sizes. It comprises government, military, religious, civic, commercial, and residential buildings, mostly with vibrantly-colored façades, wooden and metal balconies, and interior courtyards, and plazas and parks adorned with statues, sculptures, fountains, and gardens, all collectively encompassing an array of architectural forms, styles, materials, and construction methods from the 16th to 20th centuries, including medieval Gothic, early modernist Renaissance, Baroque, and Neoclassical, and modernist Art Deco and First Chicago School.

The city is nearly completely encircled by a complex system of masonry colonial fortifications, stretching 2.7 miles (4.3 km) from its northeastern corner through its northern and western edges to its southern-central border. Built between the 16th and 18th centuries, it comprises a largely contiguous network of fortresses, bastions, batteries, bartizans, and gates part of defensive curtain walls ranging from 15 to 60 feet (4.6 to 18.3 m) in height and 12 to 30 feet (3.7 to 9.1 m) in width. In 1897, the Spanish Crown approved the demolition of about 0.40 miles (0.64 km) of the southeastern fortifications to allow for the expansion of the city, including the Santiago Gate, the only land entry into the city via the adjacent Puerta de Tierra district, which holds the remains of the first three lines of defensive fortifications built to protect the city.

On the outside perimeter of the defensive walls run two pedestrian promenades collectively covering about 2 miles (3.2 km). Built in the mid-19th century, the partially waterside Paseo de la Princesa along the southwest is lined with Victorian lampposts, large trees, and various fountains, serving in part as host to artisan vendors, theatrical entertainers, among others. The completely waterside Paseo del Morro in the northwest was built in the late 20th century to serve as a walkway to reach the base of the El Morro fortress at the entrance to San Juan Bay. Immediately outside the walls also lie La Puntilla community in the south, and La Perla community and Santa María Magdalena de Pazzis Cementary in the north, all 19th-century areas considered of part of the district.

Largely surrounded by water on western San Juan Islet, Old San Juan has preserved its colonial boundary and cityscape, becoming the main historical and cultural center of Puerto Rico. Home to the oldest European buildings in the archipelago and island and the United States, as well as some of the oldest European buildings in the Americas, it receives millions of visitors annually, including cruise passengers via the San Juan Cruise Port, located in part in the original harbor of the colonial city. Two miles west of the modern urban center of Santurce barrio in the main island, it is connected to the upscale resort, entertainment, and residential districts of Condado, Miramar, and Isla Grande via three main thoroughfares, all of which converge at the Dos Hermanos Bridge and Guillermo Esteves Bridge in the eastern end of the islet, itself largely a resort area. A promenade and bikeway adjacent the northern cliffed coastline of the islet also connects Old San Juan to the main island.

== Location ==
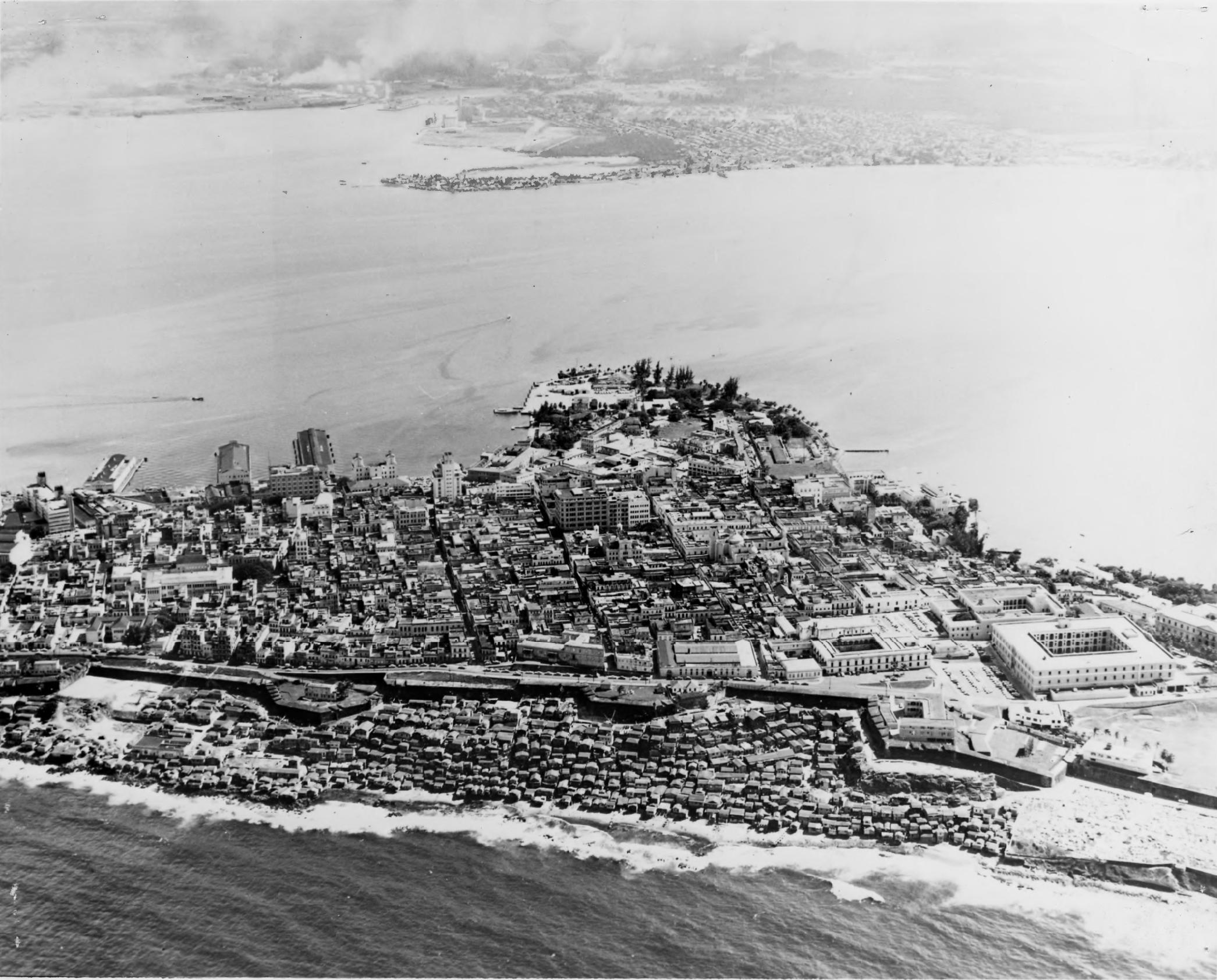
Aerial view of Old San Juan in 1952

Old San Juan is located on a small and narrow island which lies along the north coast, about 56 kilometres (35 mi) from the east end of Puerto Rico, and is connected to the mainland of Puerto Rico by three bridges. It is bounded by the Atlantic Ocean to the north and to the south by San Juan Bay (Bahia de San Juan)—which lies between the city and the mainland. On a promontory (morro) about 30 metres (100 ft) high, at the west end of the island and commanding the entrance to the harbor, rise the battlements of Fort San Felipe del Morro, and its lighthouse.

The San Antonio Channel (Caño de San Antonio) lies to the southeast, where the island of Old San Juan connects to the mainland through Santurce, by three bridges: Dos Hermanos (Ashford Avenue), G. Esteves (Ponce de León Avenue) and San Antonio (Fernández Juncos Avenue).

The city is characterized by its narrow, blue cobblestone streets, and flat-roofed brick and stone buildings, which date back to the 16th and 17th centuries—when Puerto Rico was a Spanish possession. Near Fort San Felipe del Morro, is the Casa Blanca, a palace built on land which belonged to the family of Ponce de León.

== History ==
=== Origins ===
In 1508, Juan Ponce de León founded the original settlement, Caparra (named after the Province of Cáceres, Spain, birthplace of the then-governor of Spain's Caribbean territories, Nicolás de Ovando). The ruins of Caparra are known as the Pueblo Viejo sector of Guaynabo, behind the almost land-locked harbor just to the west of the present San Juan metropolitan area. In 1509, the settlement was abandoned and moved to a site which was called at the time "Puerto Rico" (meaning "rich port" or "good port"), a name that evoked that of a similar geographical harbor in the island of Gran Canaria, Canary Islands. The official settlement of this new town was marked by the establishment of the Roman Catholic Archdiocese of San Juan in 1511, the first Catholic diocese to be established in the Americas, and by the construction of the first wooden iteration of its cathedral in 1513 together with the establishment of a Latin school by bishop Alonso Manso.

In 1521, this new settlement was given its formal name of "Ciudad de Puerto Rico de San Juan Bautista", following the custom of christening the primary settlement of an island colony with both its formal town name and the name given by Christopher Columbus to the island, honoring John the Baptist. The settlement was also platted this same year, with many of its first streets and plazas being built at the time, such Calle del Cristo, Plaza de Armas and Plaza de la Catedral. Also constructed in 1521, Casa Blanca served as the first fortification of the settlement and residence of Juan Ponce de León and his descendants until the mid-eighteenth century.

=== Expansion and growth ===
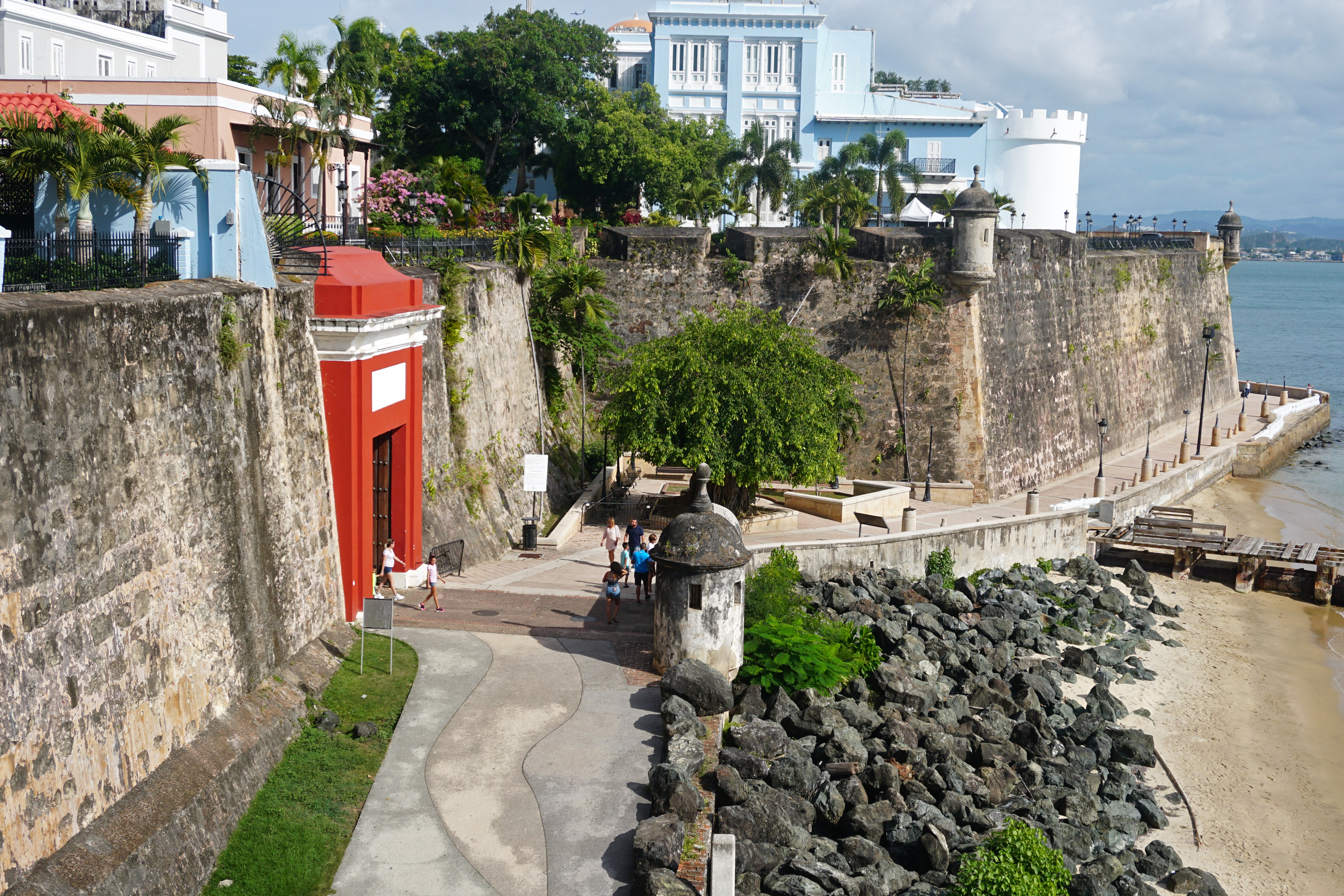
The 42-foot (12.8 m) wall that surrounds Old San Juan (as seen near the San Juan Gate)

Some of the first European establishment in the Western Hemisphere were also established in Old San Juan during the mid and second half of the 16th century. Some of these include the Thomas Aquinas Convent (today the National Gallery of Puerto Rico) in 1523, Nuestra Señora de la Concepción Hospital in 1524, and the former Gothic stone cathedral building.

The strategic position of Old San Juan in the context of the Caribbean and the Atlantic Ocean also made it a target for foreign attacks, which motivated the erection of a city wall between 1530 and 1560. Several fortresses and castles were also built during this time: La Fortaleza was built between 1533 and 1540, followed by the construction of the first battery at El Morro. Plans for the castle portion of San Felipe del Morro were made in 1584. Extensions, plus construction of El Cañuelo and El Boquerón forts, were made between 1599 and 1609. Complete circumvallation of the city was finally completed in 1641. Although several fortresses were built at the site during the time, it was not until 1771 when San Cristobal, the largest of the fortresses, was completed.

By 1776, the population totaled 6000, half of which were soldiers. The garrison town of San Juan included 100 hectares (250 acres) of military installations and 25 hectares (62 acres) of public and private use. By 1781, the city's fortifications included 376 cannon. By 1876, 24,000 lived inside the walls of San Juan, encompassing 25 hectares, and 926 buildings.

Prior to the 19th century, the area outside the city walls occupying the east side of Old San Juan Island, was almost uninhabited. In 1838 the so-called area of Puerta de Tierra had a population of 168 residents, mainly of African descent. According to a census made in 1846, the population had risen to 223 inhabitants living in 58 houses. On March 3, 1865, the municipal government of San Juan approved a resolution promoting the city expansion across the Puerta de Tierra which included the plan for demolishing the city walls along the eastern side. On May 28, 1897, the wall demolition was officially started after a proclamation was issued by Queen Maria Christina. By the year 1899, the population of Puerta de Tierra had risen to 5,453; while the area comprising the old walled city had a civilian population of roughly 18,103 inhabitants.

=== Maintaining architectural integrity ===
During the late 1940s, disrepair in the old city was evident. The local authorities were considering development proposals for renovating the old city and incorporating modern architecture on new constructions. Anthropologist Ricardo Alegría vehemently advised against the idea of demolishing old colonial buildings in favor of contemporary building designs. He followed the example suggested by his father, a local civic leader who had successfully prevented the demolition of the Capilla del Cristo in favor of a traffic redesign. He advised mayor Rincón de Gautier in having local zoning laws changed to favor remodeling and the incorporation of Spanish colonial motifs in any new construction. This helped preserve the city's architectural profile, and has been a key to San Juan's current status as a tourist destination.

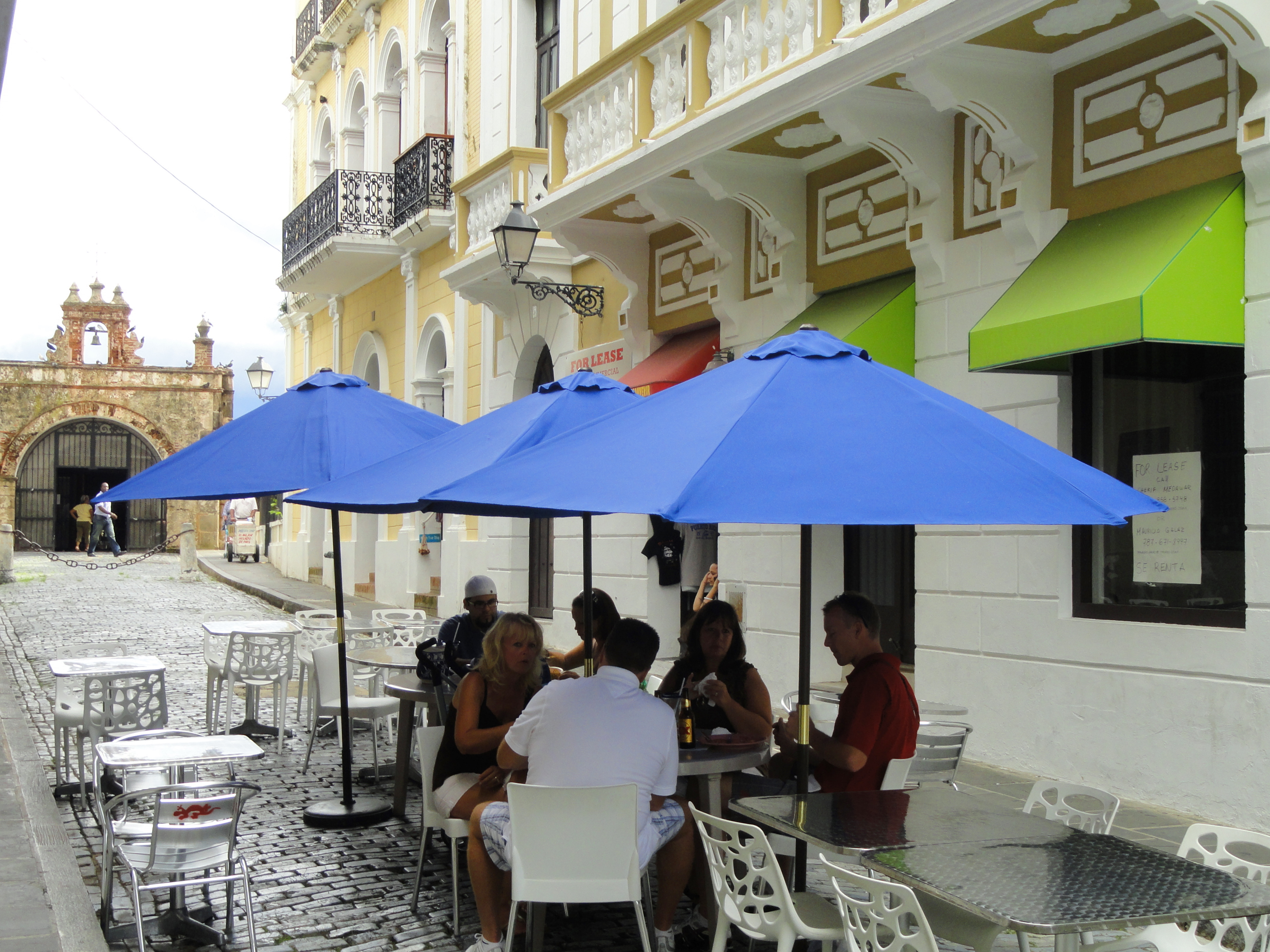
Restaurant with Capilla del Cristo seen in the background

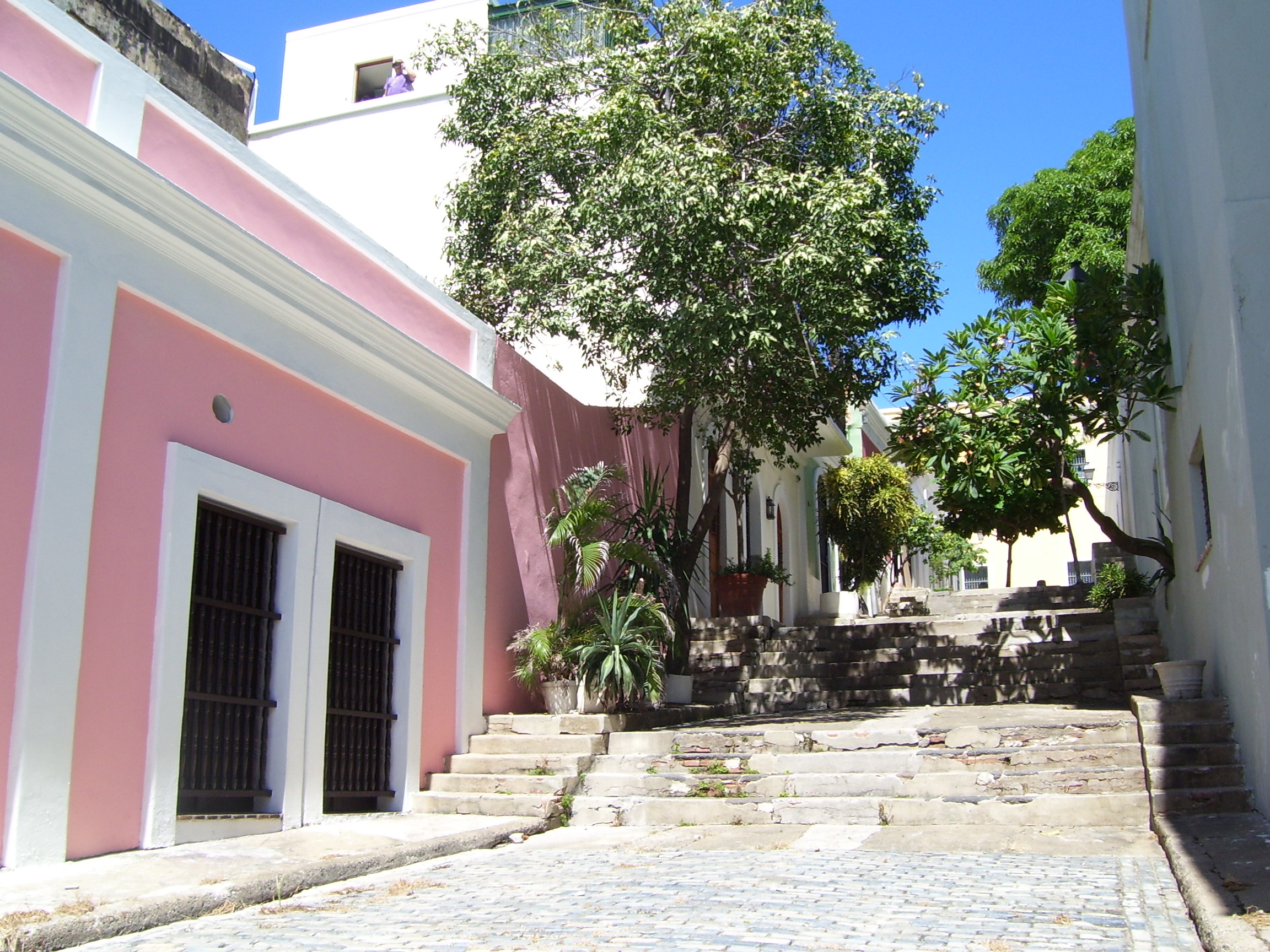
Traditional callejón in Old San Juan

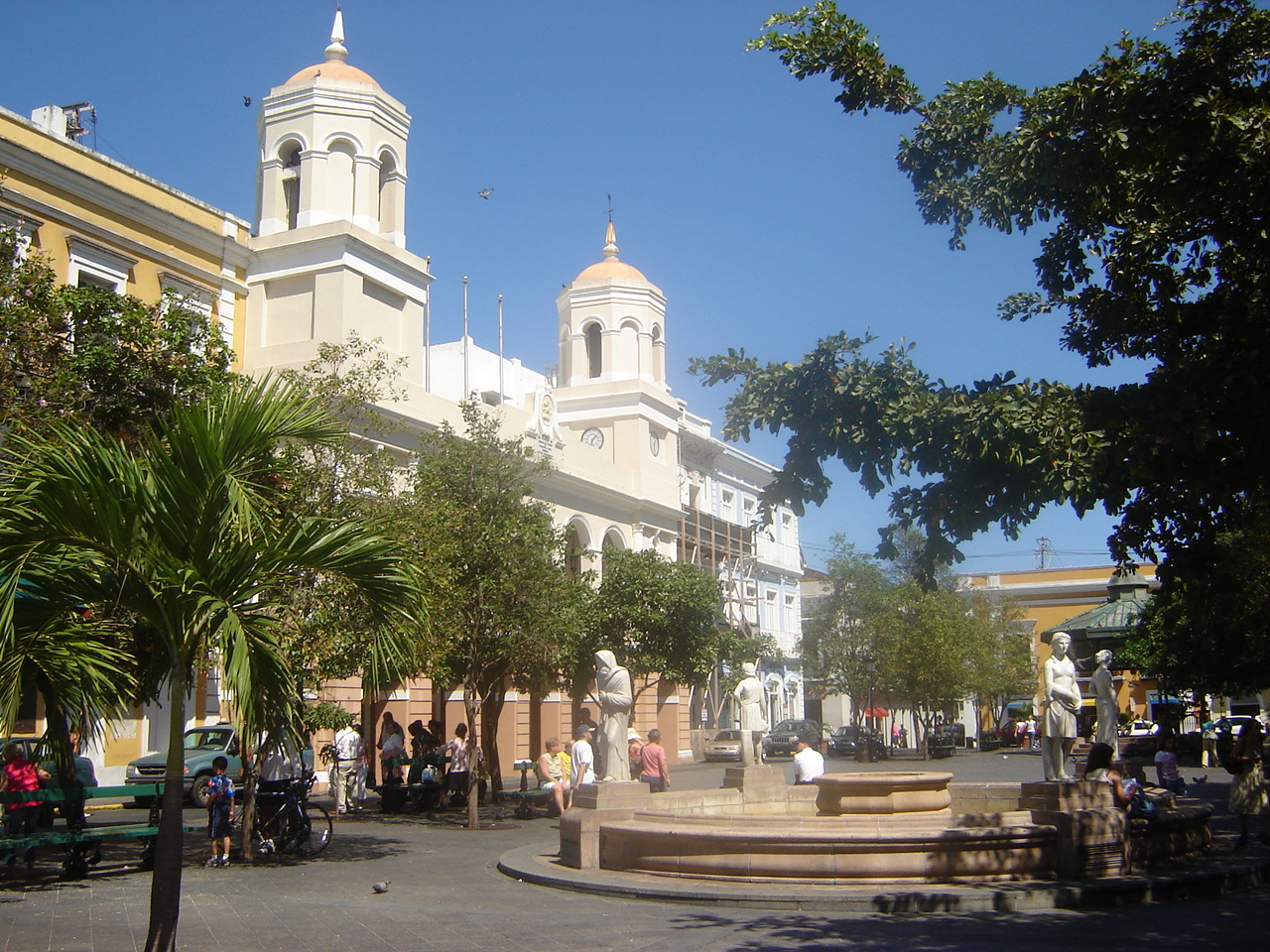
Plaza de Armas, San Juan

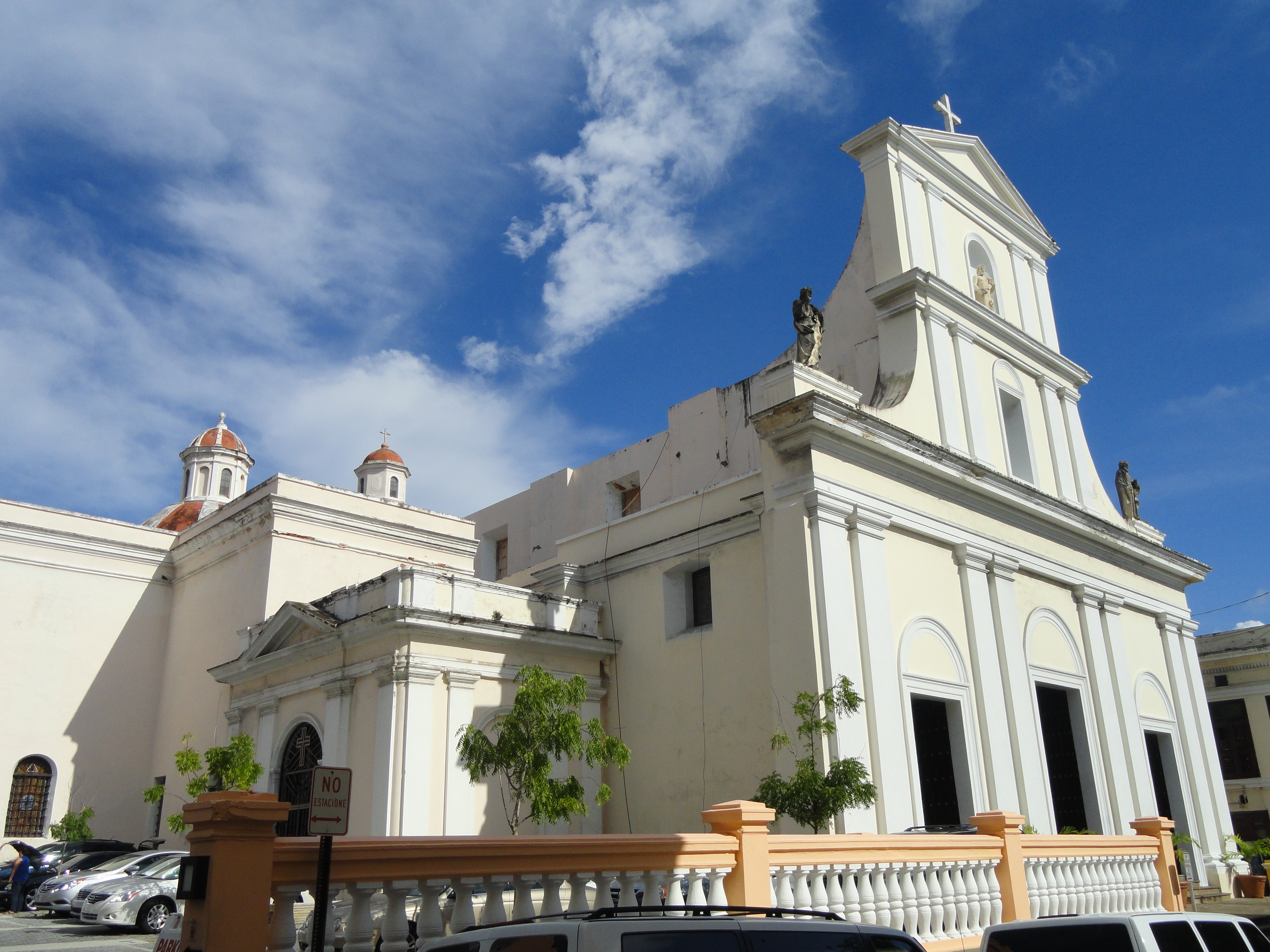
Cathedral of San Juan Bautista

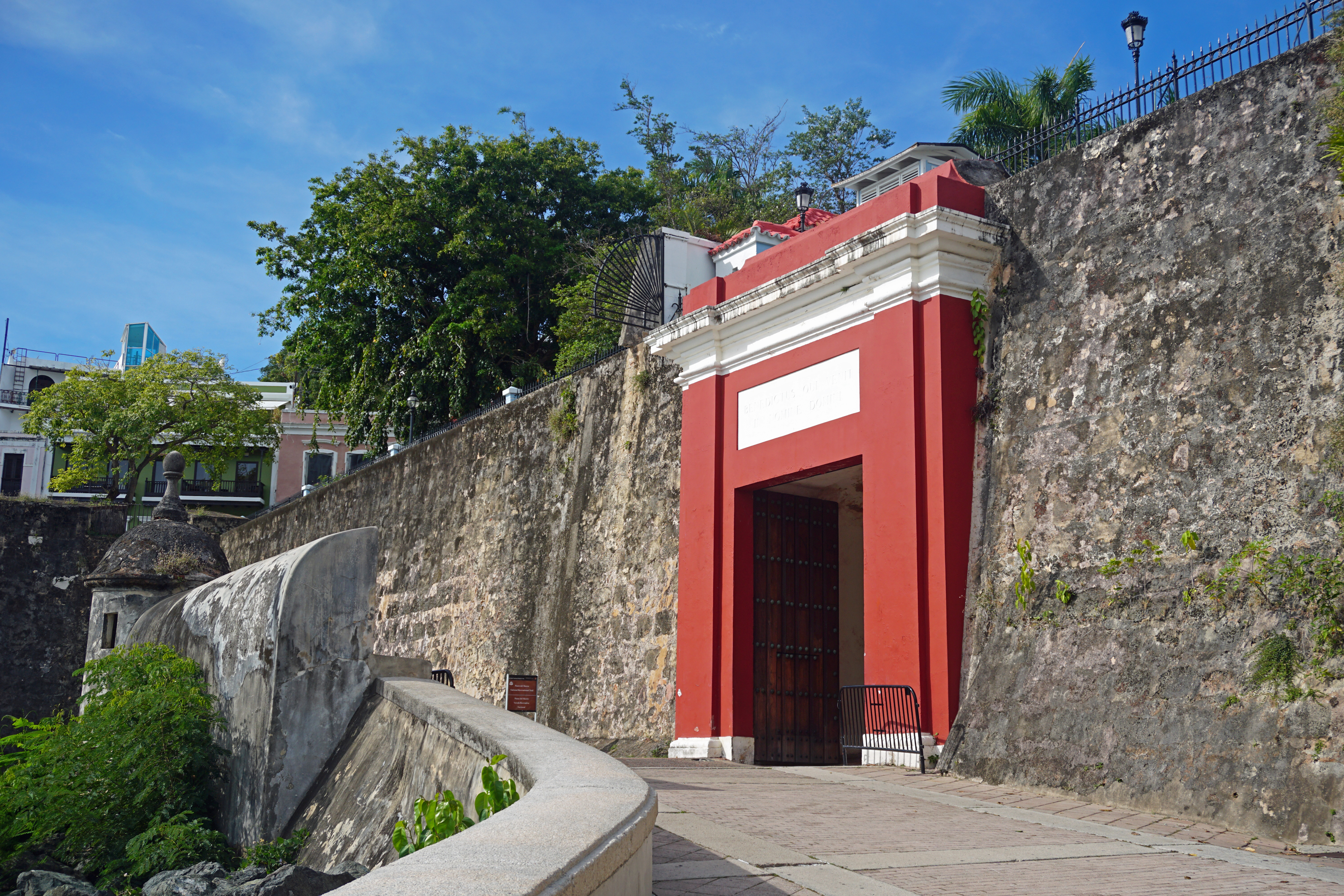
The San Juan Gate, main entrance to the walled city

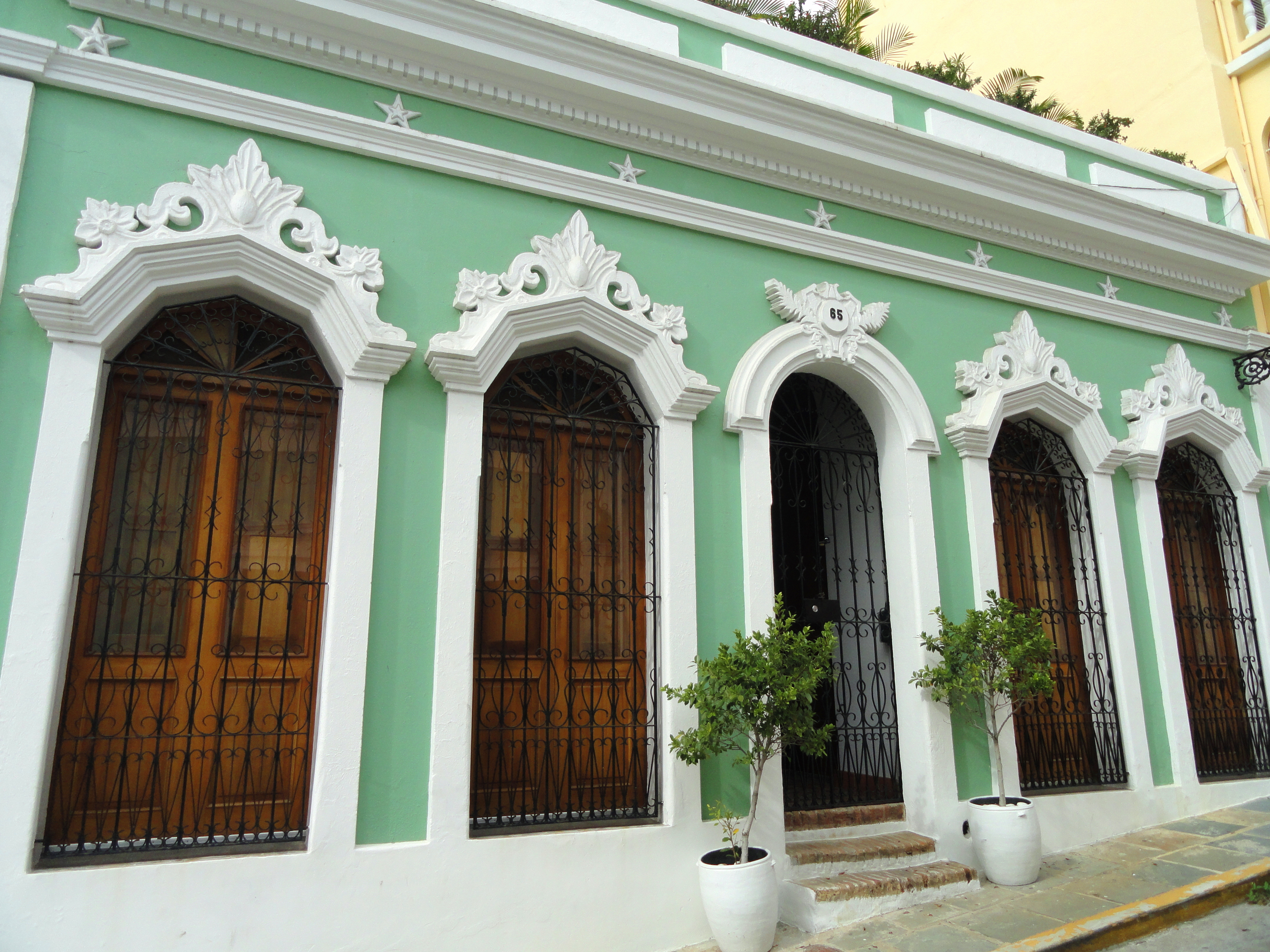
Traditional doors seen in Old San Juan

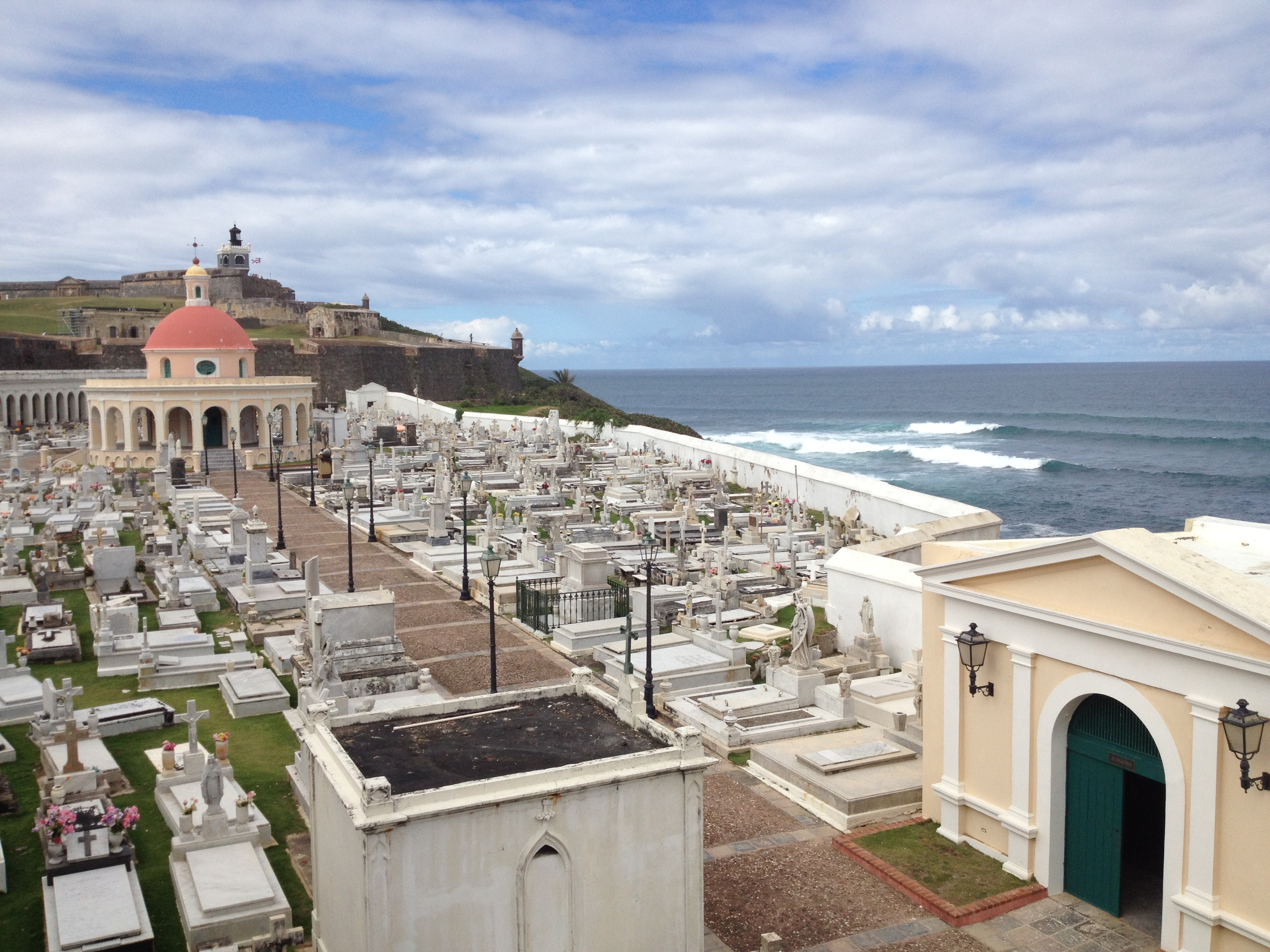
The old cemetery. Castillo San Felipe in the background

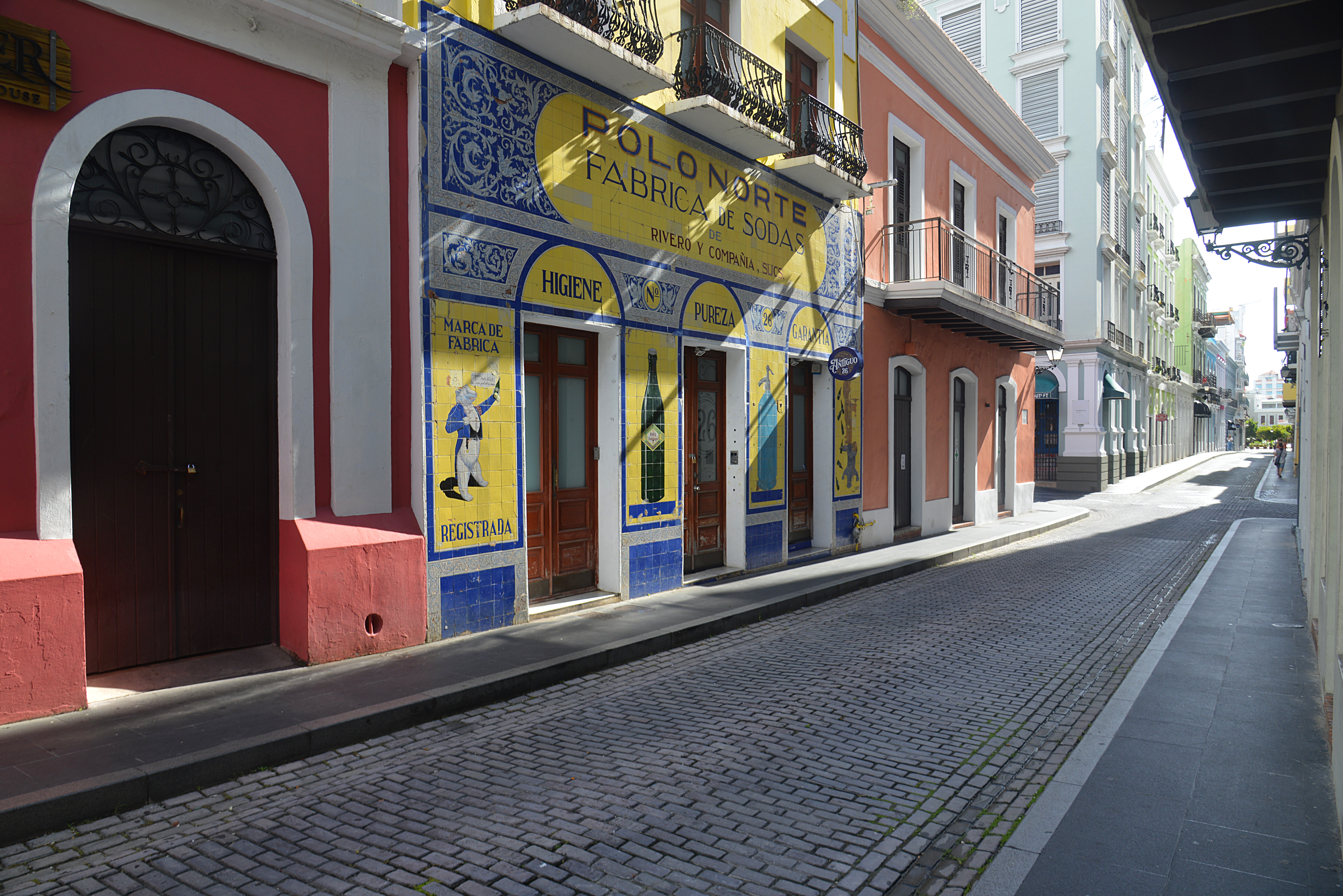
Polo Norte, Calle de Tetuan, Viejo San Juan, Puerto Rico

Luis Muñoz Marín, as a senator and later as governor of Puerto Rico, supported and implemented what became known as Operation Bootstrap, which included the development of the tourism industry. In 1948 the government invited one of the organizers of Colonial Williamsburg to lead its tourism development efforts. These efforts were further supported by the 1955 creation of the Institute of Puerto Rican Culture (Instituto de Cultura Puertorriqueña) head by Alegría. He sought legal and administrative changes that would allow for major remodeling efforts to be successful. At the time, most real estate in Old San Juan had devalued under appraised values because the city was perceived as unsafe (particularly because of building disrepair and social ills such as prostitution) and not profitable for business (because of rent control statutes, as well as the reluctance of commercial banks to fund remodeling). Under combined efforts by the institute and the Government Development Bank for Puerto Rico, "model" remodelings were made to show potential property owners how their renewed properties could look. Strict remodeling codes were implemented to prevent new constructions from affecting the common colonial Spanish architectural themes of the old city. As with other Operation Bootstrap projects, mainland corporate investors were lured in with tax breaks and other incentives. When a project proposal suggested that the old Carmelite Convent in San Juan be demolished to erect a new hotel, the Institute had the building declared a historic building, and asked that it be converted to a hotel in a renewed facility. As in other Operation Bootstrap projects, the Woolworth family was invited in 1957 to reconstruct the former convent (which had more recently been a low-rent apartment building and city garage) into the luxury Hotel El Convento. The Bank provided low interest loans to remodelers, and the government gave triple tax exemptions to commercial activities in the old city (they were exempted for a limited time, not only from property taxes and municipal taxes, but from income tax from activities generated in their properties as well). At least one retailer from the shopping district in Charlotte Amalie was given incentives to set up shop in the Calle del Cristo (the city's red light district during the early 1940s) in order to persuade other retailers to follow suit and somehow "clean up" the district. Potential developers were offered sketches of their properties after a remodeling, as to suggest which architectural elements to improve or change. The paradigm to reconstruct and renovate the old city and revitalize it has been followed by other cities in Latin America, particularly Havana, Lima and Cartagena de Indias.

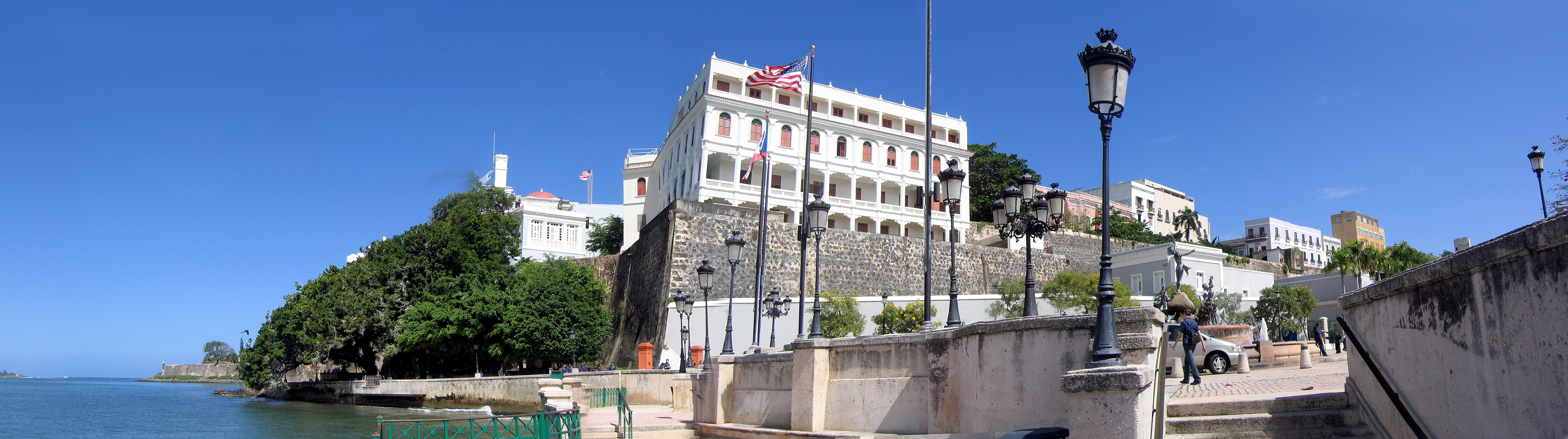
Paseo de La Princesa

== Historic designations ==
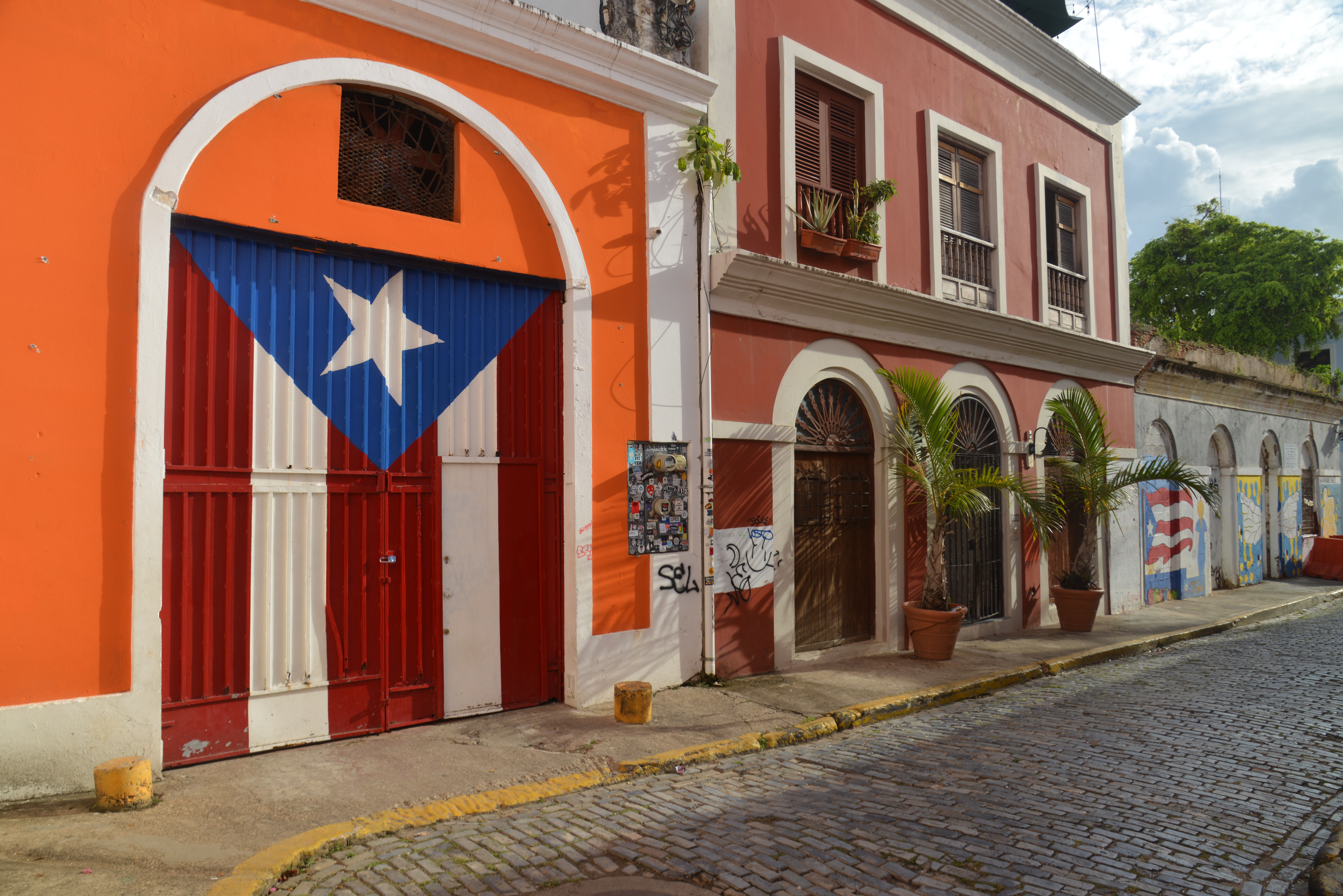
Door painted with a Puerto Rican flag, Calle de la Virtud, Viejo San Juan, Puerto Rico

The San Juan National Historic Site (Spanish: Sitio Histórico Nacional de San Juan) was established in 1949 to preserve historic fortifications in Old San Juan and the National Register of Historic Places listed it in 1966. Both that site and La Fortaleza (English: The Fortress) were then declared a single World Heritage Site by UNESCO in 1983.

In 1951, the broader area within the old city walls became the first listing of the Puerto Rico Register of Historic Sites and Zones as the Zona Antigua Histórica Casco de San Juan (English: Historic Old Town Area of San Juan). In 1972, the same area was recognized by the National Register of Historic Places as the San Juan Historic Zone (Spanish: Zona Histórica de San Juan). In 2012, the National Register increased the boundaries and renamed the district to Old San Juan Historic District (Spanish: Distrito Histórico del Viejo San Juan). Old San Juan was then designated a National Historic Landmark District in 2013.

== Landmarks and attractions ==
=== La Fortaleza and the San Juan National Historic Site ===
- San Cristóbal Castle (Castillo San Cristóbal), the largest fortification built by the Spanish in the Americas, which provided defense against both land-based and sea attacks by pirates and foreign powers during the colonial period.
- San Felipe del Morro Castle (Castillo San Felipe del Morro, or just El Morro), a 16th century citadel in the northwestern edge of the islet that provided defense against foreign and pirate attacks during the Spanish colonization, also the site of a historic lighthouse.
- Santa Catalina Palace, popularly known as La Fortaleza (Spanish for the fortress), a former fortification and currently the official residence of the governor of Puerto Rico. It is the oldest executive residence in the Western Hemisphere.
- The San Juan City Walls surround Old San Juan and it gives the city one of its nicknames, "La ciudad amurallada" (the walled city). About 3/4 of the city walls remain intact but only one of the city gates remain in existence. San Juan is one of the six cities under United States jurisdiction that possessed defensive walls and it is the only US city that still preserves its colonial defensive wall system.

=== Plazas and squares ===
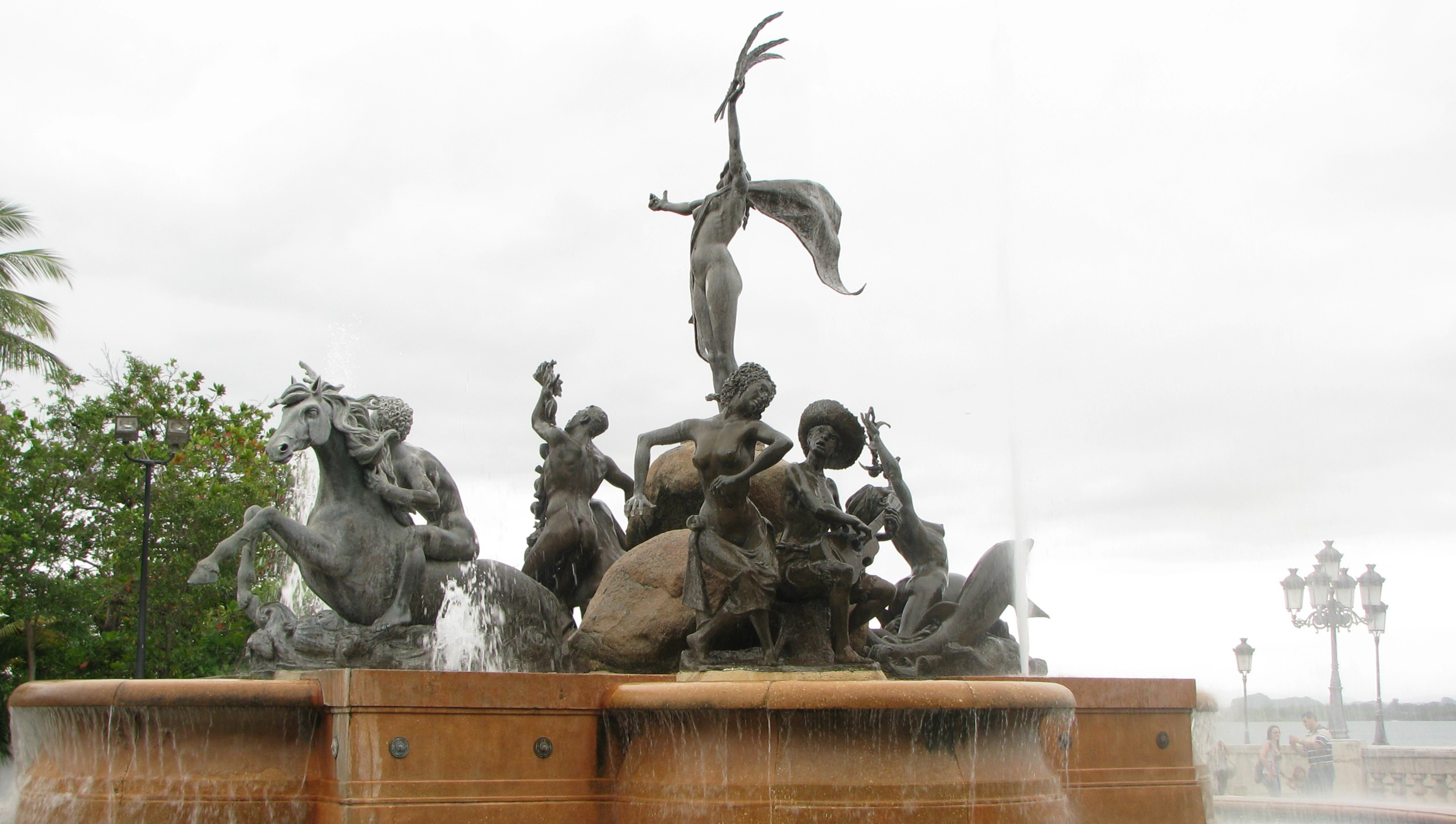
Raíces Fountain at the end of Paseo de La Princesa is dedicated to Puerto Rico's European, African and native Taino roots.

- Paseo de La Princesa (Spanish for promenade of the princess) is a famous promenade named after the former La Princesa Prison. It extends for 400 metres (1,300 ft) and runs along the southern city wall of Old San Juan. It provides views of San Juan's city walls and San Juan Bay, and it is a popular location that becomes very lively during festivals and other cultural celebrations. A boardwalk at the end of the promenade connects it to Puerta de San Juan (the San Juan City Gate), formerly known as Puerta de Agua (Spanish for water gate), the only remaining city gate.
- Plaza Colón (Spanish for Columbus square or plaza) is located in the eastern end of Old San Juan where the former eastern city walls used to be located. Originally named Santiago Square, the plaza is now a popular meeting place for locals and tourists as it is located next to famous landmarks such as the San Cristóbal castle and the Tapia Theater.
- Plaza de Armas is the main town square of San Juan where several administrative buildings such as the historic San Juan City Hall are located. A plaza de armas is a large square often found in Spanish-founded cities across the Americas and the Philippines that were originally intended for military parades, hence the name "plaza de armas" (literally arms or weapons square).
- Plaza de la Catedral (English: Cathedral Square), popularly known as Plazuela Las Monjas, is located south of Hotel El Convento and west of the main entrance to San Juan's cathedral.
- Plaza de San José (English: San José Square), formerly known as Plaza de Santo Domingo, is located next to San José Church. It is also a popular meeting place due to its location next to restaurants and other businesses important to Old San Juan's nightlife. The statue of Ponce de León located in the center of the square is famous for being built from melted British cannons obtained after Sir Ralph Abercromby's failed attempt to capture San Juan.
- Plaza del Quinto Centenario (English: Square of the Fifth Centenary) is a modern square built to commemorate the 500th year anniversary of San Juan and the European discovery of Puerto Rico and the Americas. The square is located next to the Ballajá Barracks and El Morro.
- Plazuela de la Rogativa is a small plaza located close to La Fortaleza that is famous for the bronze sculpture of La Rogativa. The sculpture, completed by New Zealand artist Lindsay Daen in 1971, portrays "La Rogativa" (Spanish for the pleading), from a legend that says that the British invasion led by Sir Abercromby was foiled thanks to a pleading procession led by the bishop of San Juan and a group of women carrying torches. The story states that the British mistook the procession for Spanish reinforcements.
- Parque de las Palomas (Spanish for park of the pigeons), despite its name is a public plaza rather than a park located at the end of Calle del Cristo next to the chapel of the same name. In addition to the wonderful views of San Juan and the bay that this space offers, the plaza is famous, specially among children, for the numerous pigeons that live there. There are vendors who sell bird food to feed the pigeons.

=== Churches and religious buildings ===
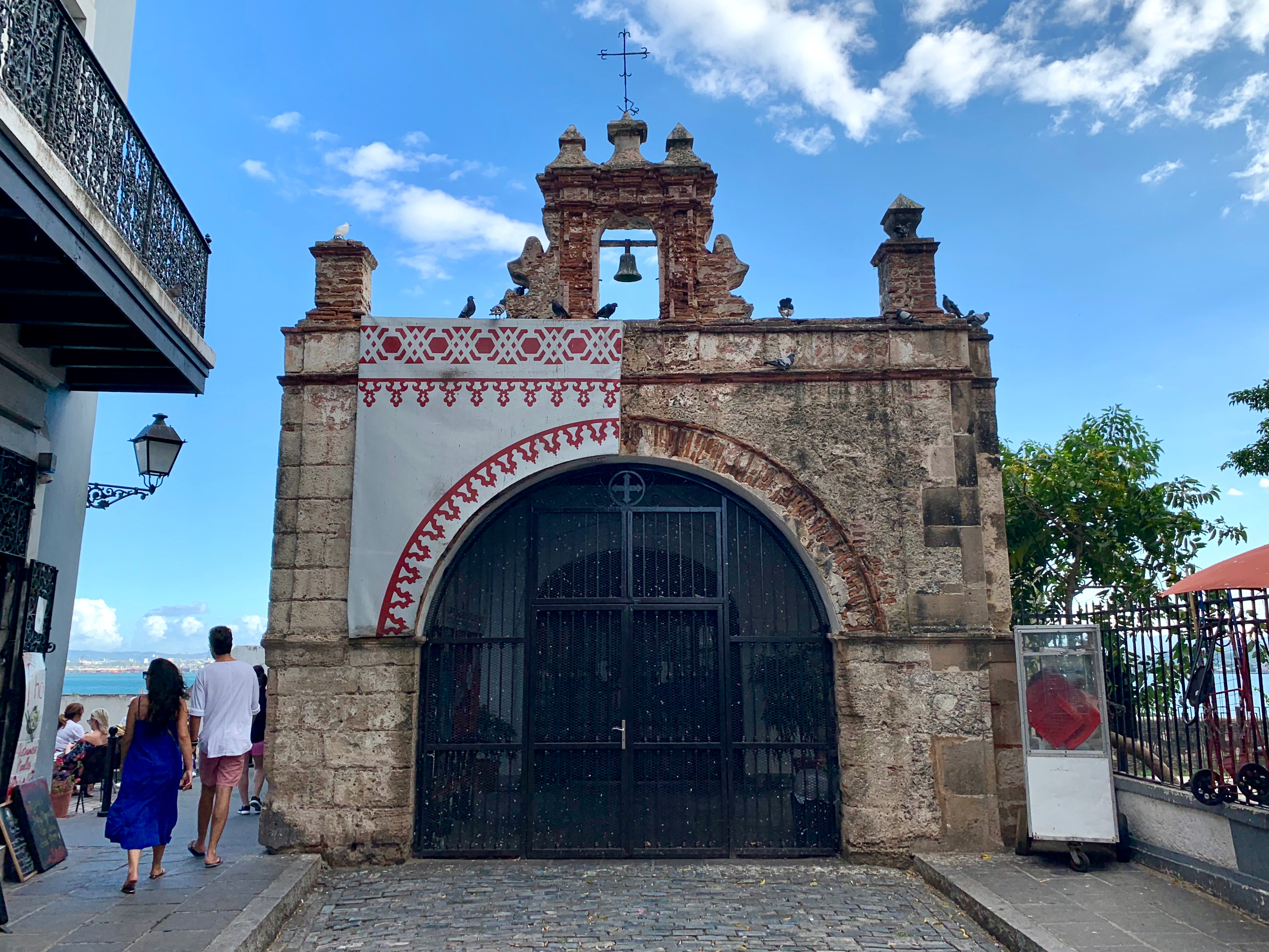
Capilla del Santo Cristo de la Salud

- San Juan Cathedral, officially the Metropolitan Cathedral Basilica of Saint John the Baptist (Spanish: Catedral Basílica Metropolitana de San Juan Bautista), the Catholic cathedral and one of the oldest buildings in Old San Juan. It is considered the oldest cathedral in the United States and the second oldest cathedral in the Americas (after the Santo Domingo Cathedral in the Dominican Republic). It contains various relics and tombs, including that of Juan Ponce de Leon.
- San José Church (Iglesia de San José) is one of the most important architectural landmarks of Old San Juan and the earliest surviving example of 16th century Spanish Gothic architecture in the Americas. The church was closed for renovation for many years and it reopened for visitors and religious services in 2021.
- Saint Francis of Assisi Church (Iglesia de San Francisco de Asís) is a Catholic parish church located in the San Francisco sub-barrio of Old San Juan.
- Santa Ana Church (Iglesia de Santa Ana) is an often-missed historical 17th century church located on Tetuán Street.
- Santo Cristo de la Salud Chapel (Capilla del Santo Cristo de la Salud), popularly known as Capilla del Cristo, a small 18th century chapel which was saved from demolition in the 20th century that has become a famous landmark and cultural symbol of Puerto Rico and its folklore. The chapel also houses a small museum.

=== Museums ===
- Casa Blanca (Spanish for white house) is a house museum located in a historical fortification which was the official residence of Juan Ponce de León and his family.
- Casa de la Familia Puertorriqueña del Siglo XIX (Spanish for house of the 19th-century Puerto Rican family) is a traditional Old San Juan residence showcasing domestic life during the 19th century.
- Casa Rosa (Spanish for pink house) is a historical house and former military barracks which once housed a museum for traditional arts and crafts. Today it operates as a daycare center and cannot be visited without previous arrangements.
- The Ballajá Barracks (Cuartel de Ballajá) were military barracks which now house several important museums such as Museo de Las Américas (English: Museum of the Americas), in addition to a library, music and dance schools, and spaces for cultural events.
- The Puerto Rico National Gallery (Galería Nacional) houses one of the largest collections of Puerto Rican paintings and it is located in a former Dominican Order monastery.
- The Casa del Libro Museum is a library and museum dedicated to the history of books and showcases historic books and documents dating back to the 15th century.
- The Museum of San Juan (Museo de San Juan), located in the former city marketplace, showcases the history of San Juan and Puerto Rico through art and object displays.
- The Museum of the Sea (Museo del Mar) is a small private museum dedicated to the maritime history of Puerto Rico and the Caribbean.
- The Felisa Rincón de Gautier House Museum (Museo Casa de Felisa Rincón de Gautier) is a biographical house museum dedicated to the life and work of not only the first female major of San Juan but the first female major of any capital city in the Americas.
- The Pablo Casals Museum located in the former home of famous composer and cellist Pablo Casals, which also contains his piano, some of his musical instruments and a music library.
- The National Foundation for Popular Culture of Puerto Rico (Fundación Nacional Para la Cultura Popular) also hosts art exhibits and educational activities.
- The Power y Giralt House (Casa Ramón Power y Giralt) is a historic house owned at some point by Puerto Rican Admiral of the Spanish Navy Ramón Power y Giralt, now a museum and gift shop owned and operated by the Conservation Trust of Puerto Rico's Para la Naturaleza.
- Old San Juan is also home to numerous private art galleries.

=== La Perla ===
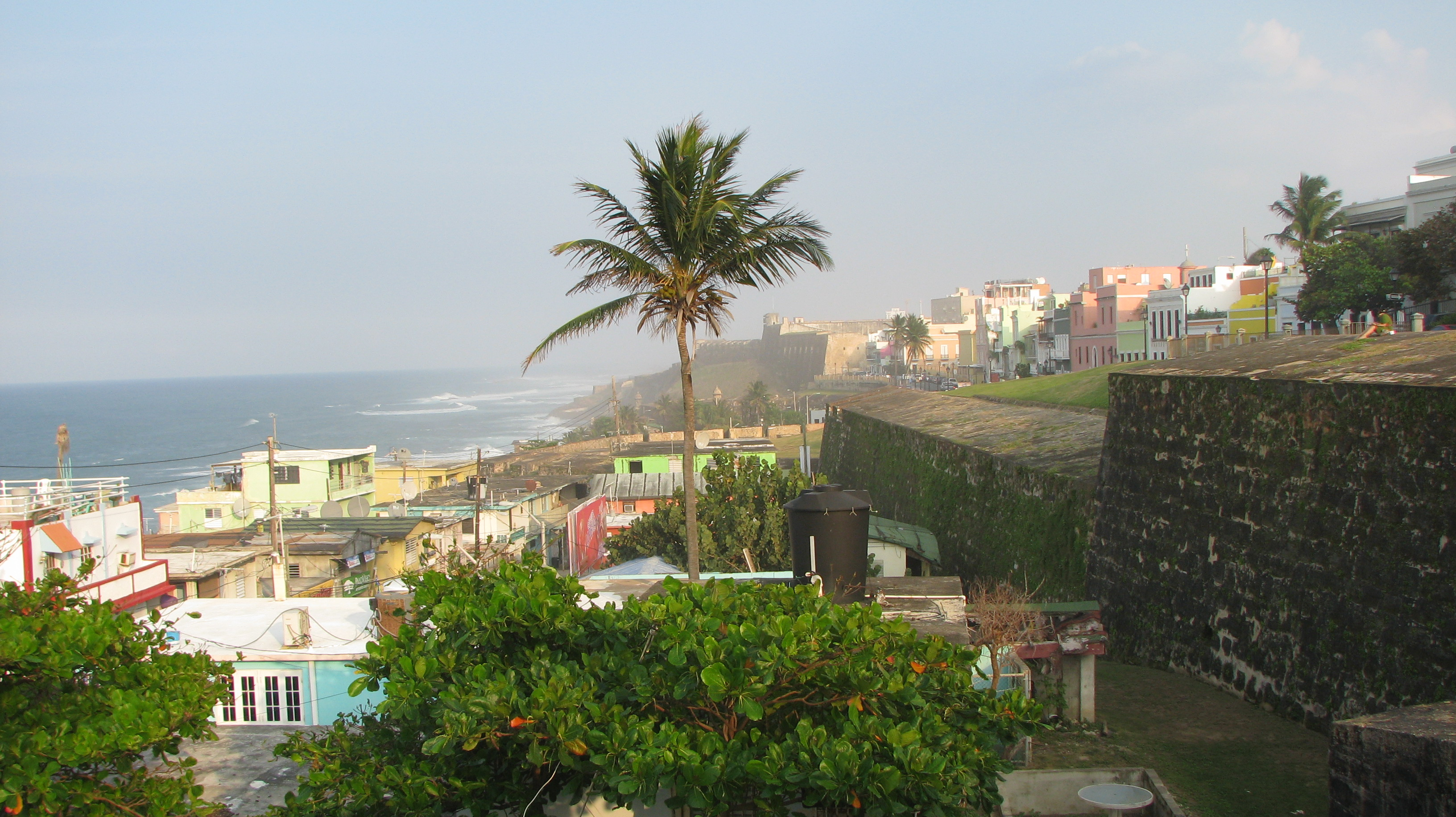
La Perla in Old San Juan

La Perla (Spanish for the pearl) is a former shanty town or informal settlement located along the northern section of the historic San Juan city walls. Originally the site of slaughterhouses, the area was later settled by freed slaves and non-white servants in the 18th century. In the 20th century the community grew to become a neighborhood of Old San Juan and its reputation has recently transformed from a dangerous place into a cultural hub. It has appeared on films, literature, TV shows and music videos.

=== Other places of interest ===
- Ateneo Puertorriqueño (Spanish for Puerto Rican Athenaeum) is a cultural institution that often hosts cultural events.
- El Batey is a popular restaurant, bar and tourist attraction located in a historic colonial building famous for its graffiti-covered balls, beer and rum-based drinks, and hipster-like atmosphere.
- El Mundo Building (Edificio El Mundo) is the former headquarters of the now defunct El Mundo newspaper. The building is a protected historic site and is famous for its architecture.
- Hotel El Convento is a small hotel located in a historical Carmelite convent (San José of Our Lady of Mount Carmel Monastery) next to the San Juan Cathedral. The building is of architectural importance and it is a member of Historic Hotels of America.
- Jose V. Toledo Federal Building and United States Courthouse is a historic post office building located in the south of Old San Juan famous for its Spanish Colonial Revival architecture.
- Patio Español Building, also known as La Filarmonica building, is an eclectic Mission/Spanish revival-style building from 1937 which has been listed on the National Register of Historic Places since 2005.
- Puerto Rico School of Plastic Arts and Design (Escuela de Artes Plásticas y Diseño de Puerto Rico) is a tertiary art school founded by the Institute of Puerto Rican Culture located in a historical building and former hospital next to El Morro fortress.
- San Juan Coast Guard Station is a USCG station located in the port of San Juan close to the cruise ship docks. The former lighthouse superintendent's dwelling still stands and was added to the NRHP in 1981.
- Santa María Magdalena de Pazzis Cemetery (Cementerio Santa María Magdalena de Pazzis) is a colonial-era cemetery located next to La Perla and El Morro. It is also the final resting place of numerous figures from Puerto Rico's history, politics, media and popular culture such as nationalist leader Pedro Albizu Campos, Puerto Rico statehood activist José Celso Barbosa, and actors José and Miguel Ferrer.
- Tapia Theater (Teatro Alejandro Tapia y Rivera) is the oldest free-standing theater in San Juan and one of the oldest theaters in the Caribbean. It is located on Plaza Colón.
- The Old Casino (Antiguo Casino de Puerto Rico) is a former casino and current venue for cultural events and private weddings.
- The former U.S. Custom House (Antigua Aduana), with its pink-colored exterior, is one of the most distinctive buildings in the Old San Juan port area.
- The former San Juan Arsenal (Arsenal de San Juan) is a historic building complex and former Spanish military installation.

== Today ==
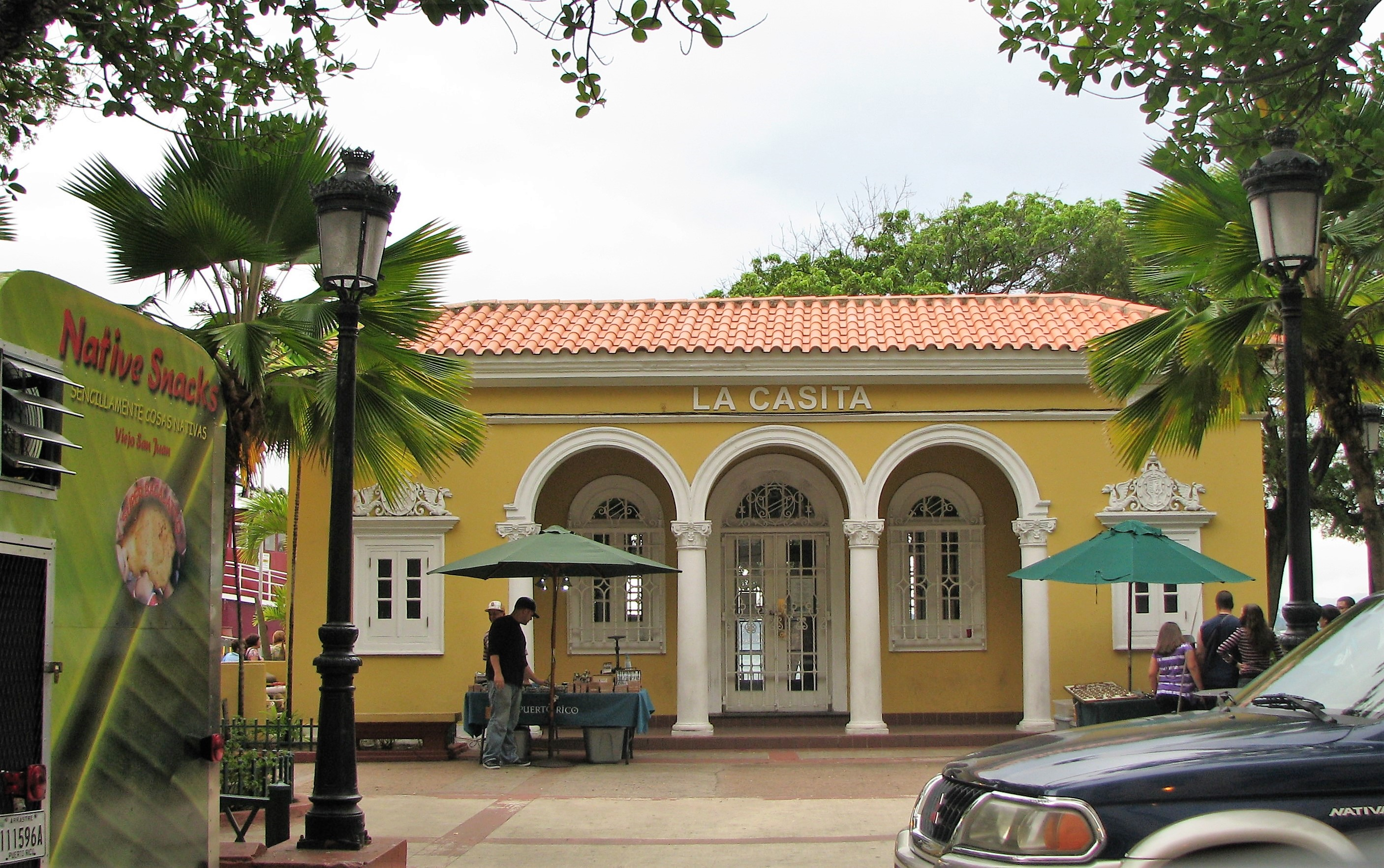
La Casita in Old San Juan

With its shops, historic places, museums, open air cafés, restaurants, homes, and tree-shaded plazas, Old San Juan is known for its domestic and international tourism.

The district is characterized by numerous public plazas, which are filled with local shops that sell traditional craftwork, sculptures and typical musical instruments. Moreover, Old San Juan is known for its historical churches, such as San José Church and the Cathedral of San Juan Bautista, which contains the tomb of the Spanish explorer and first European to discover modern day Florida, Juan Ponce de León.

Tourists' main spot to visit at Old San Juan is Castillo San Felipe del Morro, a fort built by the Spaniards when settled on the Island. Besides the magnificent fort, tourists are drawn to La Perla, a colorful neighborhood outside of the historic city wall.

Old San Juan is one of the two barrios, in addition to Santurce, that made up the municipality of San Juan after 1864 and prior to 1951, in which the former independent municipality of Río Piedras was annexed.

== Blockhouses and subbarrios ==
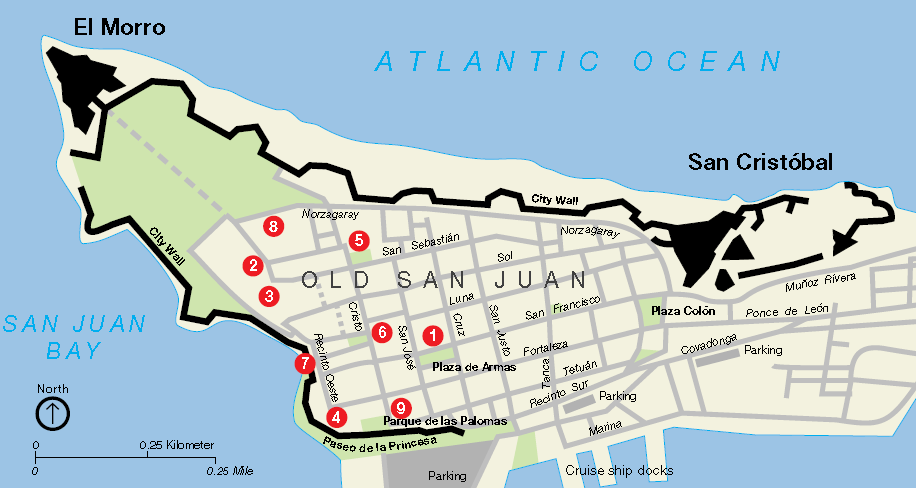
Old San Juan

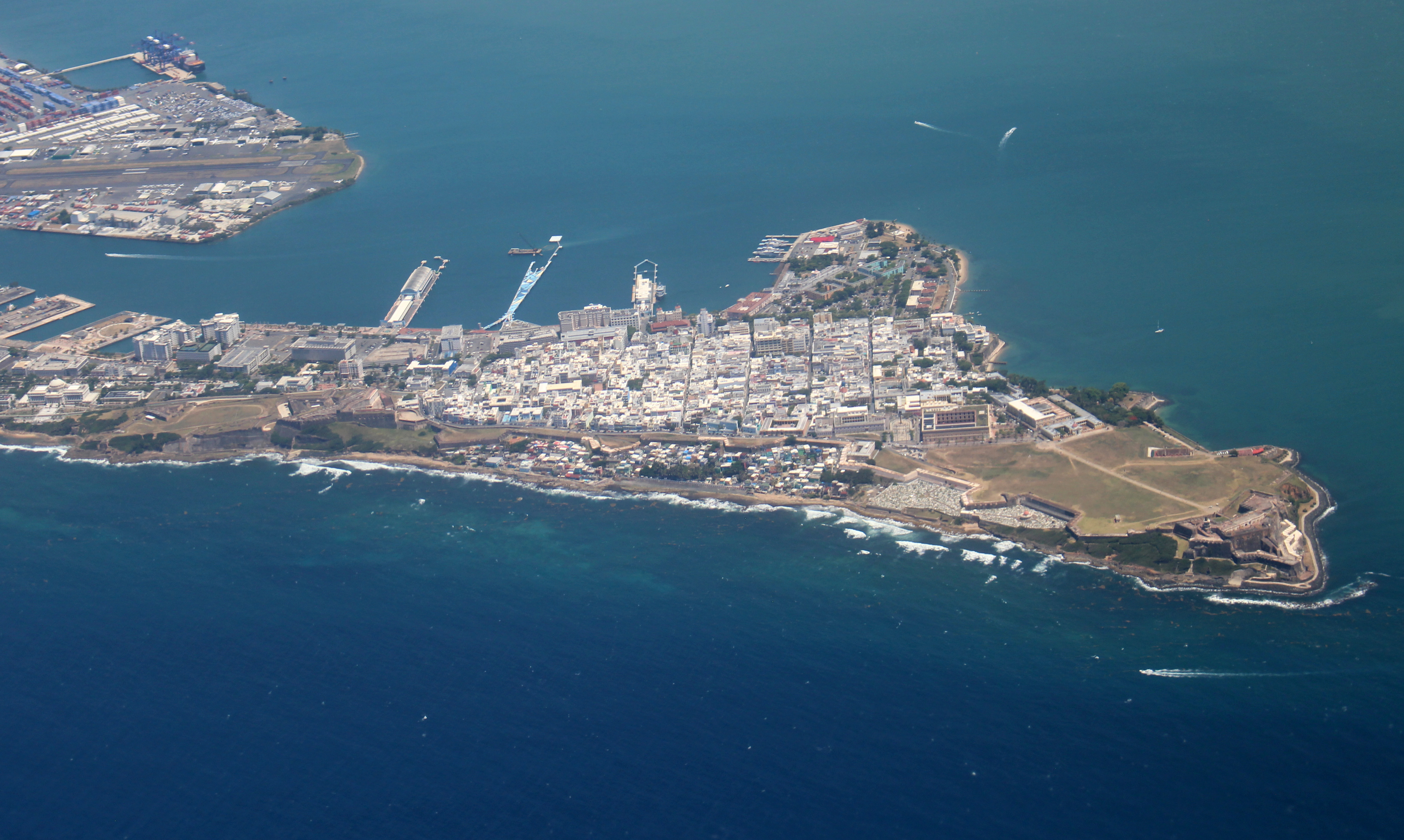
Aerial view of Old San Juan as of 2022

The oldest parts of the district of Old San Juan remain partly enclosed by massive walls. Several defensive structures and notable forts, such as the Fort San Felipe del Morro, Castle of San Cristóbal, and el Palacio de Santa Catalina (also known as La Fortaleza), acted as the primary defense of the settlement which has been subjected to numerous attacks. La Fortaleza continues to serve also as the executive mansion for the Governor of Puerto Rico. Many of the historic fortifications are part of San Juan National Historic Site. Old San Juan's land area roughly correlates to the following subbarrios of barrio San Juan Antiguo: Ballajá, Catedral, Marina, Mercado, San Cristóbal, and San Francisco.

== Public transportation ==
Old San Juan is the location for one of two transportation hubs serving Metropolitan San Juan. At one time, a free trolley provided limited service to Old San Juan seven days a week but is not available any longer. People get around the city on foot or by car. There have been plans to turn the historic district into a pedestrian-only zone, and to either rebuild the trolley system or build a new light-rail train system in the recent years.

== Popular culture ==
Old San Juan is the setting for films, books, song lyrics and music videos, including the following:

- Noel Estrada, a Puerto Rican composer, wrote the popular song "En mi Viejo San Juan" in 1943. The song has been recorded by over 1,000 times by artists around the world, including many Puerto Rican musicians such as Trio Vegabajeño, Danny Rivera, Marc Anthony, Luis Miguel, José Feliciano, among many others.
- The Rum Diary, a film starring Johnny Depp, based on Hunter S. Thompson's novel of the same name was filmed in Old San Juan; the film is set in the 1960s.
- United States of Banana (2011), a geopolitical tragicomedy about Puerto Rican independence by Giannina Braschi, has battle scenes set in old San Juan, including La Fortaleza, La Perla, El Capitolio, El Morro, and El Escambron beach.
- Music videos by Luis Fonsi, Pet Shop Boys, Daddy Yankee, Ricky Martin, Bad Bunny, and Marc Anthony are set in Old San Juan. The music video of the song Despacito, which won Latin Grammy Awards for Record of the Year, Song of the Year, Best Urban Fusion/Performance, and Best Short Form Music Video featured La Perla.

== See also ==
- Ballajá Barracks
- Timeline of San Juan, Puerto Rico
- List of United States National Historic Landmarks in United States commonwealths and territories, associated states, and foreign states
- National Register of Historic Places listings in San Juan, Puerto Rico
- Isla de Cabras
