= List of streets in San Juan, Puerto Rico =

This article provides a listing with simple descriptions of the streets in the Puerto Rican municipality (municipio) of San Juan.

== List of streets ==
Name	Southern or western terminus	Northern or eastern terminus	Length, mi (km)	No. of lanes	Traffic direction	Notes	Photo
Avenida Juan Ponce de León	—	—	unknown	1–3	S to N	—	
Avenida Luis Muñoz Rivera	—	—	unknown	2–4	N to S	—	
Calle Central	Calle Villa Verde	Calle José Martí	0.26 (0.42)	1–2	N to S	Calle Central's path is interrupted by the Expreso Luis Muñoz Rivera (PR-1).	
Calle de la Cruz	Calle del Recinto Sur	Dead-end	0.3 (0.48)	1	S to N	—	
Calle de la Fortaleza	La Fortaleza	Calle del Recinto Sur	0.48 (0.77)	1	W to E	Continues east as Avenida de la Constitución (Avenida Juan Ponce de León).	
Calle José Martí	Calle Olimpo	Calle Suau	0.41 (0.66)	2	E to W	—	
Calle de la Luna	—	—	unknown	1	W to E	Calle Luna, Calle Sol is the name of song by Puerto Rican salsa musicians, Willie Colón and Héctor Lavoe.	
Calle Madrid	Avenida Juan Ponce de León	Marginal Baldorioty de Castro	0.1 (0.16)	1	N to S	—	
Calle de San José	Calle de Tetuán	Calle de San Sebastián	0.23 (0.37)	1	N to S	—	
Calle de San Justo	Calle del Comercio	Calle de Norzagaray	0.34 (0.55)	1–2	N to S	Runs southbound, one-way from Calle de Norzagaray to Calle del Recinto Sur where it becomes a two-lane, two-way street for one block.	
Calle de San Sebastián	Dead-end	Calle de la Tanca	0.43 (0.69)	1	W to E	Traffic runs westbound from Calle de San Justo to the dead-end and eastbound from Calle de San Justo to Calle de la Tanca.	
Calle del Sol	—	—	unknown	1	E to W	Calle Luna, Calle Sol is the name of song by Puerto Rican salsa musicians, Willie Colón and Héctor Lavoe.	
Calle Trigo	Avenida Juan Ponce de León	Marginal Baldorioty de Castro	0.12 (0.19)	1	N to S	—	
Calle Unión	Calle Las Palmas	Marginal Baldorioty de Castro	0.35 (0.56)	1	S to N	The street is segmented between Avenida Juan Ponce de León and Calle McKinley.	
Paseo de la Princesa	Paseo del Morro	Calle Tizol	unknown	2	W to E	—	
