= Paseo de la Princesa =

Promenade in the historic district of San Juan, Puerto Rico

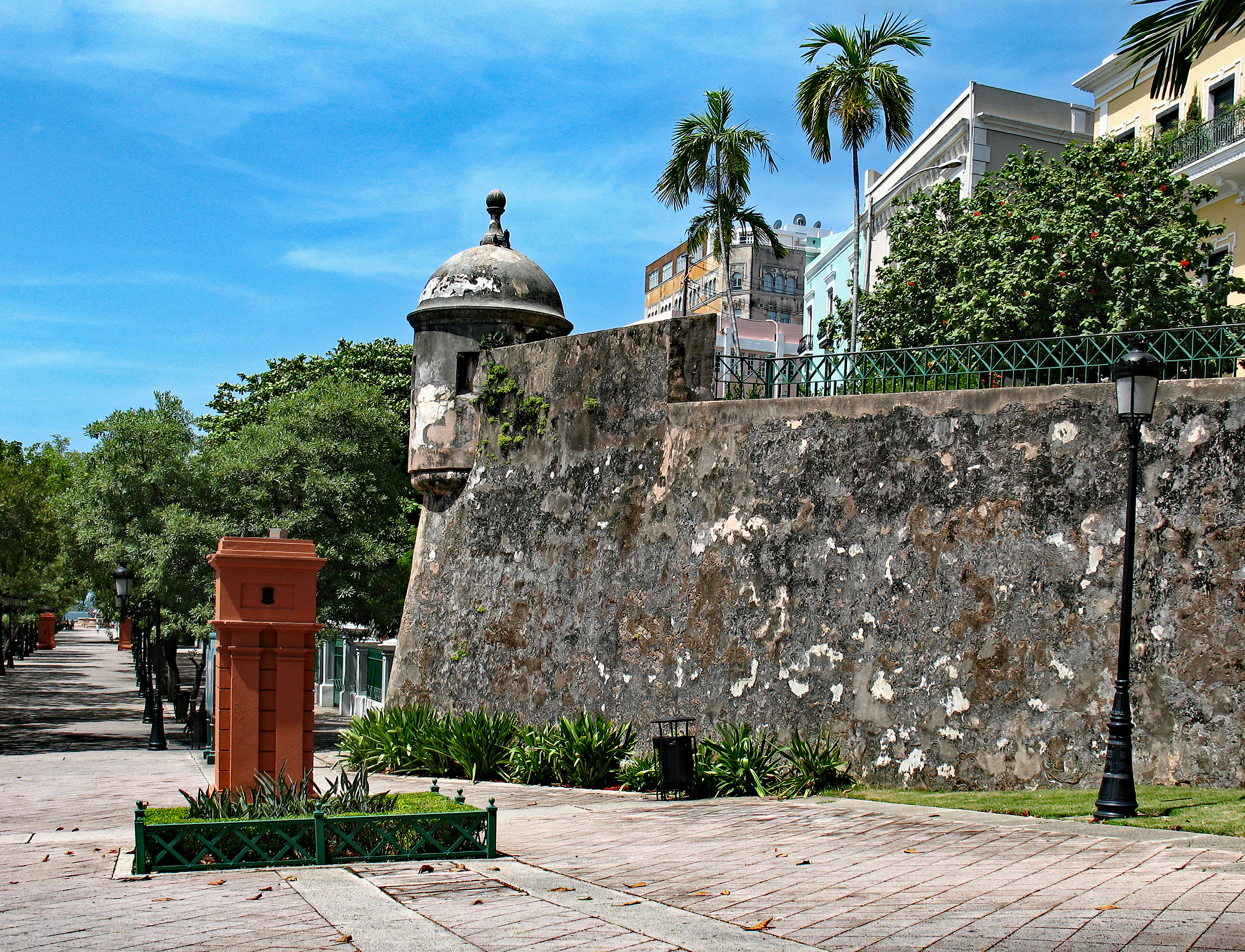
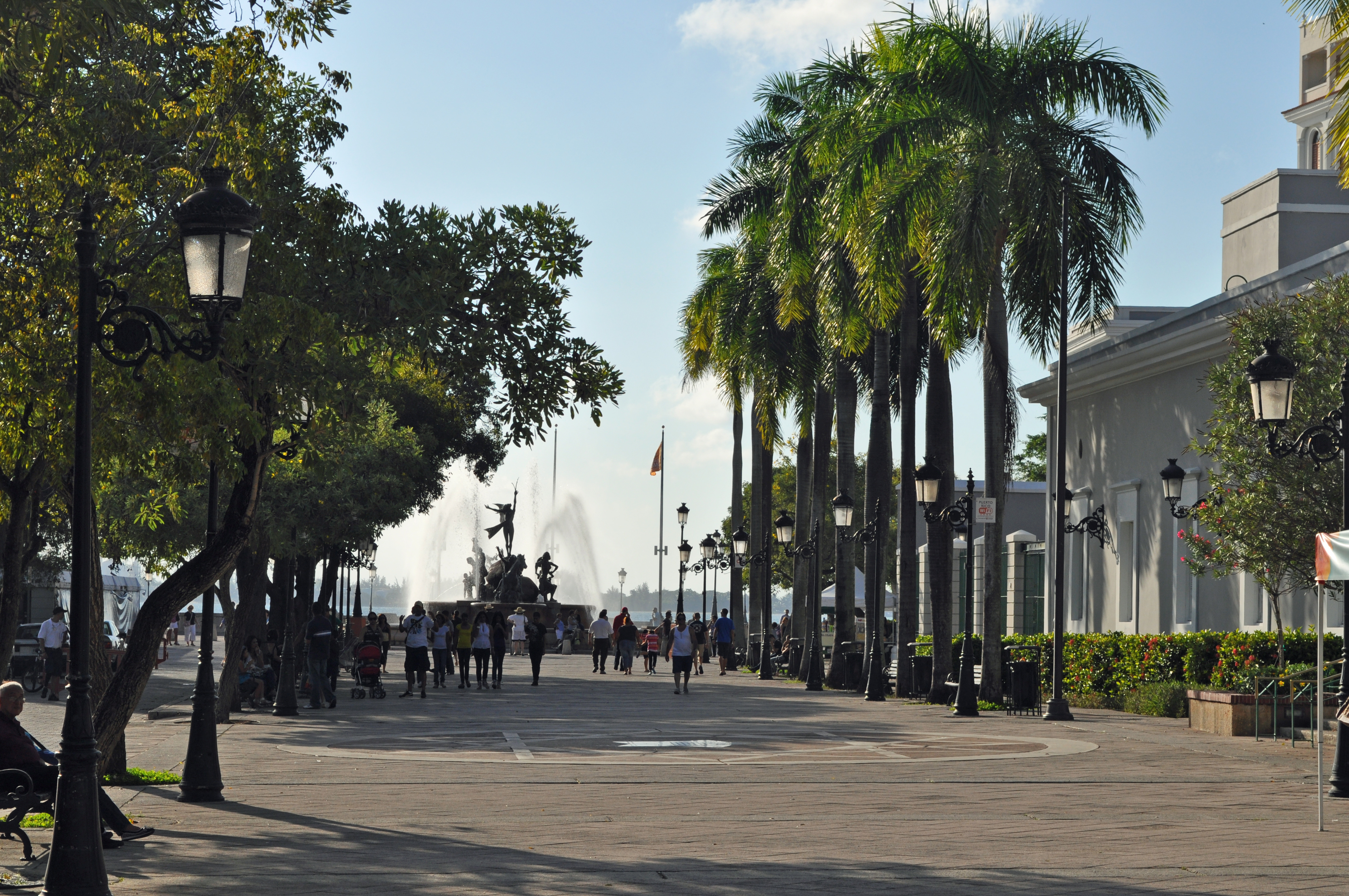
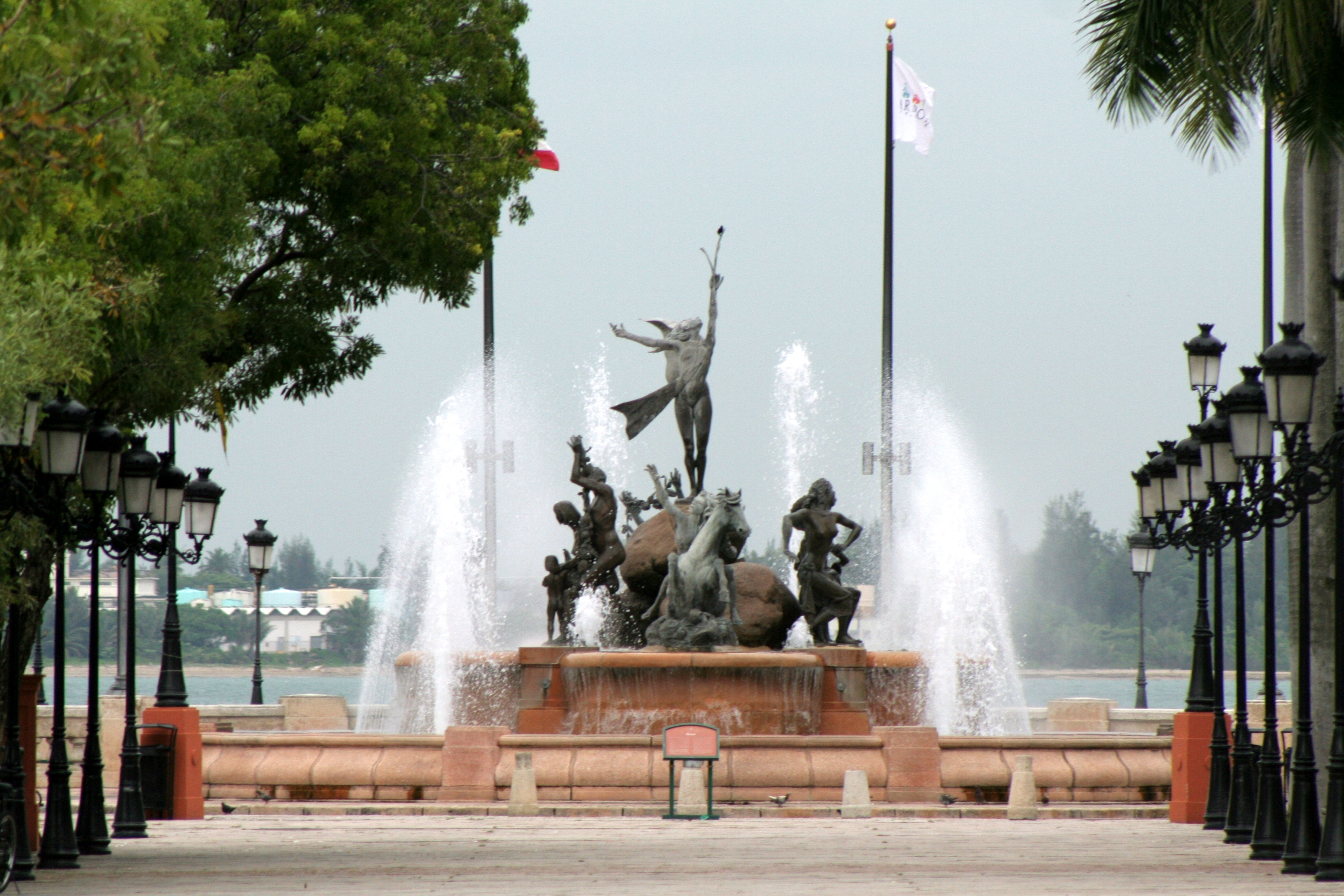
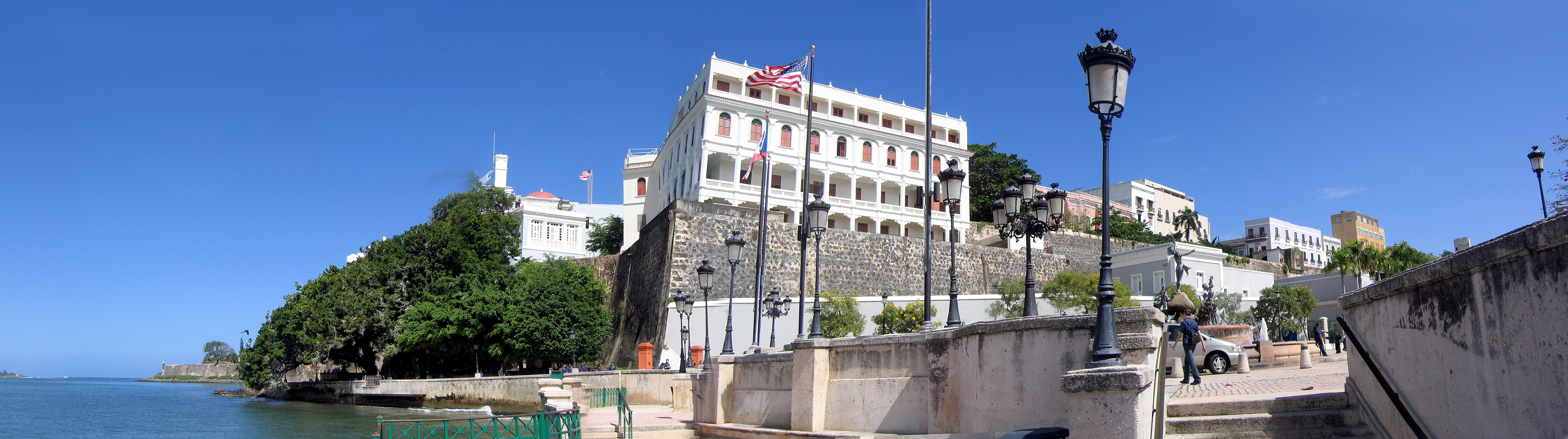
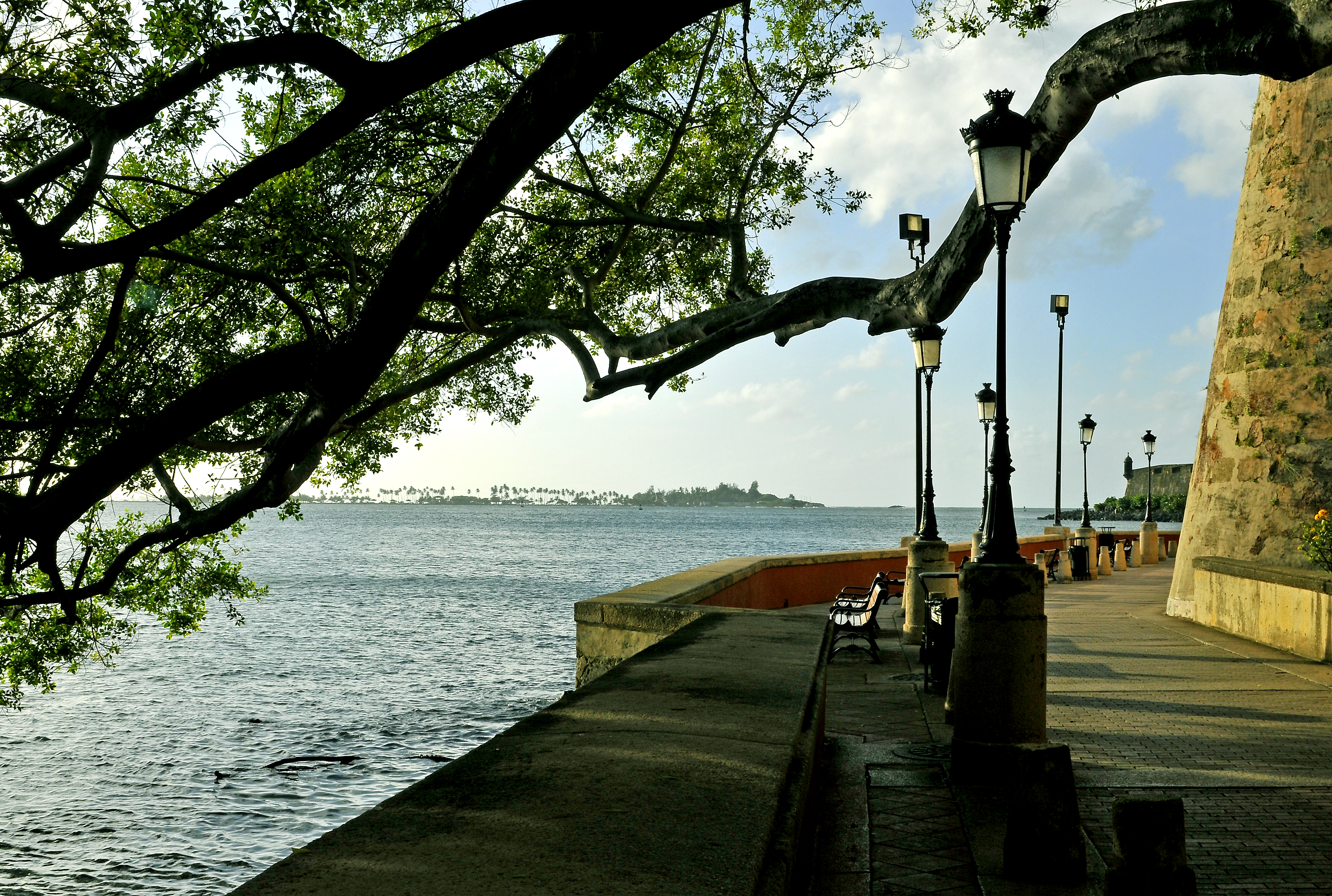
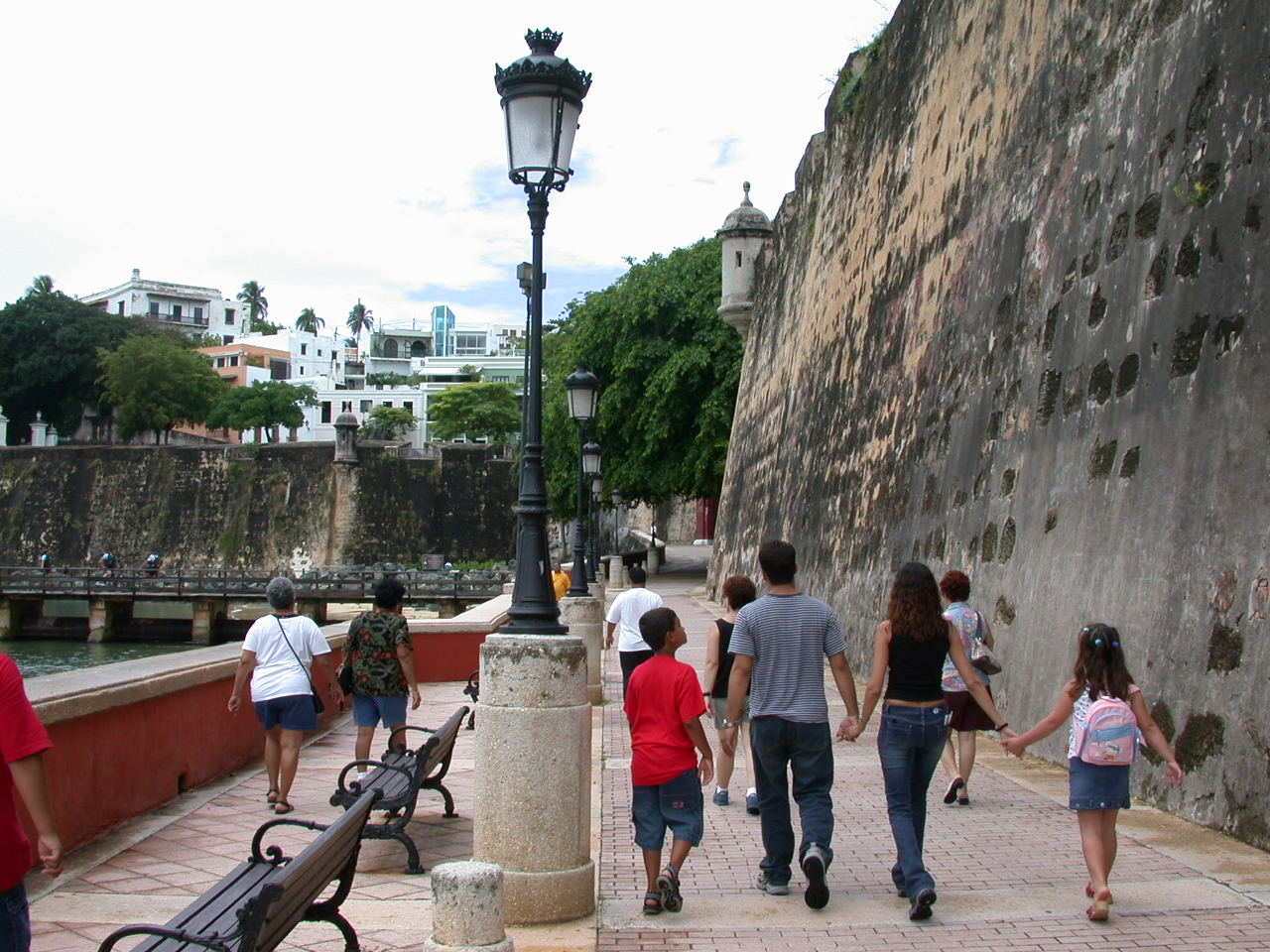
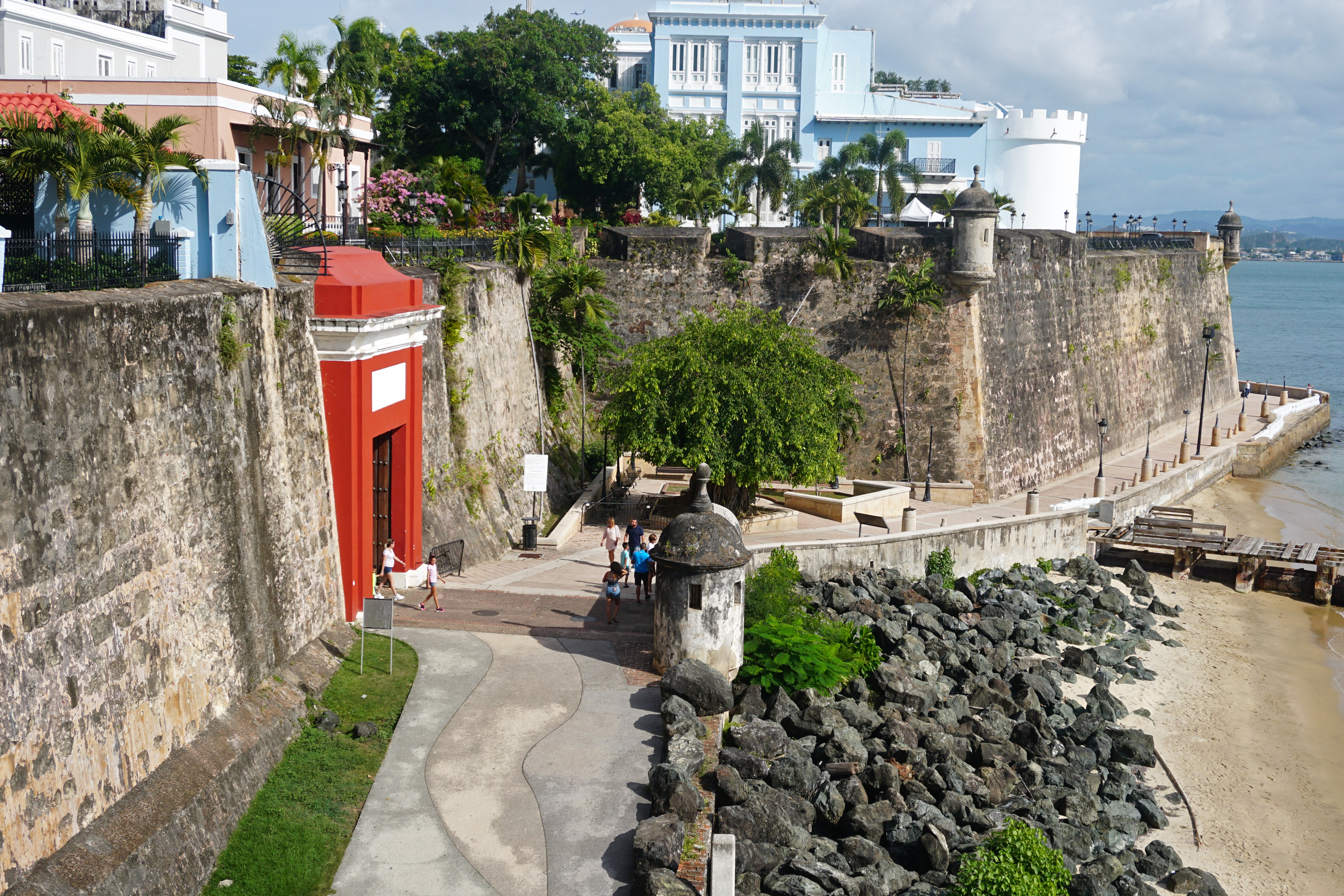
- From top, left to right: Starting point of Paseo de la Princesa at remaining portion of southern section of the Walls of Old San Juan next to Bastión de la Derecha de San Justo y Pastor; midpoint next to Antigua Prisión La Princesa (Princess Old Prison), below Convent of the Servants of Mary, and adorned with Fuente Raíces (Roots Fountain); waterfront part of promenade next to San Juan Bay across from Isla de Cabras; and its endpoint at Puerta de San Juan (San Juan Gate) on the western section of the Walls of Old San Juan below La Fortaleza
- Interactive

General information
- Type: Promenade
- Architectural style: Fortification, Spanish Renaissance, Victorian
- Location: Old San Juan, Puerto Rico
- Coordinates: 18°27′48″N 66°7′6″W
- Opened: 1852–54
- Owner: Government of Puerto Rico
- Paseo La Princesa
- U.S. Historic district – Contributing property
- U.S. National Historic Landmark District – Contributing property
- Part of: Old San Juan Historic District (ID72001553 & ID13000284)

Significant dates
- Designated CP: October 10, 1972
- Designated NHLDCP: February 27, 2013

Paseo de la Princesa (English: Promenade of the Princess or Princess Promenade), is a partially waterside 19th-century pedestrian promenade about .50 miles (0.80 km) in length, located in the historic district of Old San Juan in Puerto Rico. Constructed between 1852 and 1854 in honor of Queen Isabella II of Spain’s first-born, Princess of Asturias Infanta Isabel, the promenade runs adjacent and parallel to the southwestern section of the Walls of Old San Juan. Lined with Victorian lampposts and benches, large trees and gardens, and varying fountains and sculptures, it hosts food and artisan vendors, musical and theatrical entertainers, and cultural restaurants and festivals.

The promenade starts at Bastión de la Derecha de San Justo y Pastor on the Walls of Old San Juan in Marina, the southernmost sub-barrio in Old San Juan on the San Juan Islet, passing by the Antigua Prisión La Princesa (Old La Princesa Prison) from 1837, currently housing the Puerto Rico Tourism Company, and the popular Fuente Raíces (Roots Fountain), a large sculptural fountain overlooking San Juan Bay since 1992 that represents Puerto Rican identity, a mixture of Taino, Spanish, and Sub-Saharan African ancestry and culture, and ending in the southwestern sub-barrio of Catedral in Old San Juan at the beginning of the western section of the Walls of Old San Juan at Puerta de San Juan (San Juan Gate), formerly known as Puerta de Agua (meaning 'water gate'), which lies next to La Fortaleza, the 16th-century executive residence of the Governor of Puerto Rico, and is the starting location of Paseo del Morro (Morro Promande), the waterfront promenade covering the rest of the western section of the defensive walls, culminating on Punta del Morro (Morro Point) at the bottom of Castillo San Felipe del Morro at the westernmost position on San Juan Islet overlooking the entrance to San Juan Bay.

== Overview ==
Paseo de la Princesa is often described as one of the most scenic city walkways in the world and, as a result of its location close to the cruise ship harbor, it is often the starting point for sightseeing in Old San Juan.

Located on a plaza at the midpoint of the promenade, Fuente Raíces (Roots Fountain) is a 1992 sculpture fountain by Spanish sculptor Luis Sanguino representing and celebrating the ancestral roots of the Puerto Rican identity: the European culture brought by the Spanish and other settlers, the African culture by the Sun-Saharan African slaves and the indigenous culture by the native Taino. This plaza also hosts a small wooden dock that offers great views of San Juan Bay, El Yunque and the Sierra de Luquillo to the east, and of other municipalities, such as Cataño and Bayamón to the west.

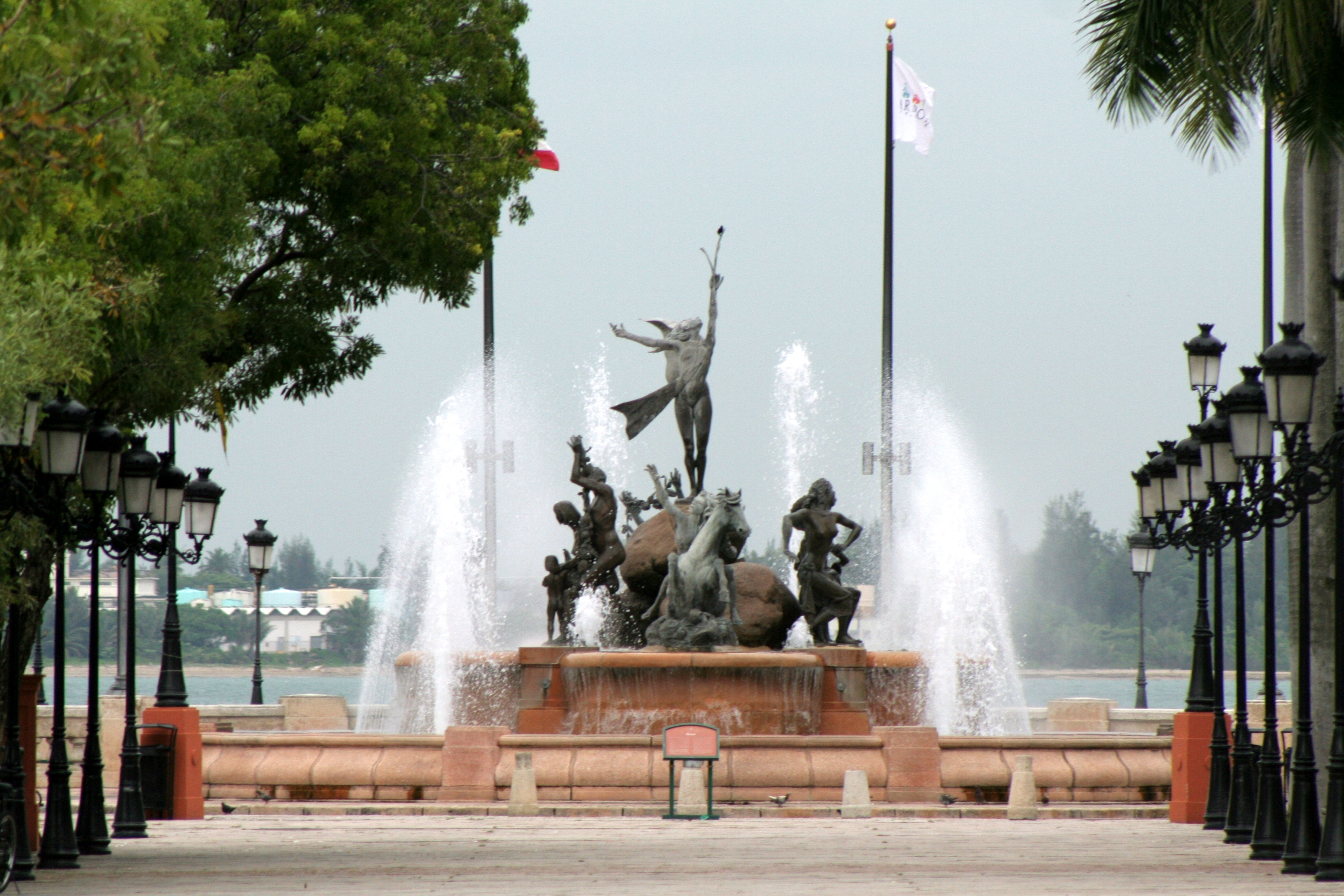
Fuente Raíces (Roots Fountain) on Paseo de la Princesa in Old San Juan

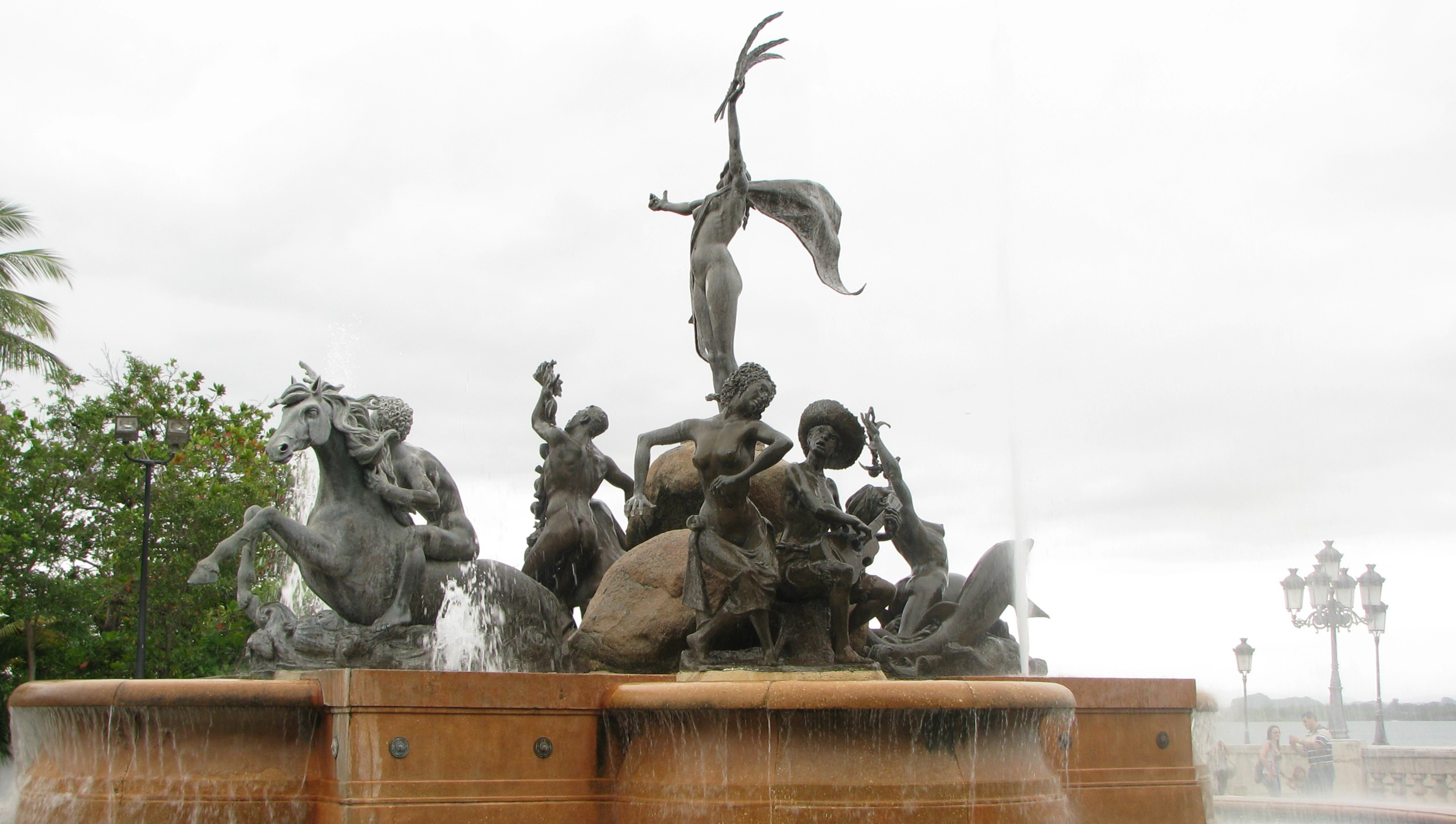
Closeup of the Fuente Raíces (Roots Fountain) on Paseo de la Princesa in Old San Juan

The only remaining city gate on the Walls of Old San Juan, the iconic Puerta de San Juan (San Juan Gate), originally called the Puerta de Agua (Water Gate) because it was the first gate to offer water access to the city of Old San Juan, is found at the end of the promenade. The gate is near La Fortaleza, Capilla del Cristo and Parque de las Palomas. There is also waterside promenade named Paseo del Morro that continues along the western defensive walls towards El Morro at the entrance to San Juan Bay.

Other landmarks and attractions are the Americas Heritage Fountain, the San Justo y Pastor Bastion, the La Concepción Bastion, and a playground for children. The promenade also hosts an open air café and a restaurant that serves traditional Puerto Rican food called Princesa Gastrobar. Piraguas, piña coladas and platanutres (fried plantain chips) are popular drinks and snacks to buy in the esplanade. During the weekends and festival celebrations, one can find live music, street vendors, traditional street food and temporary art exhibitions. There is live jazz on Fridays and Saturdays, and salsa music and dance on Saturdays and Sundays.

== History ==
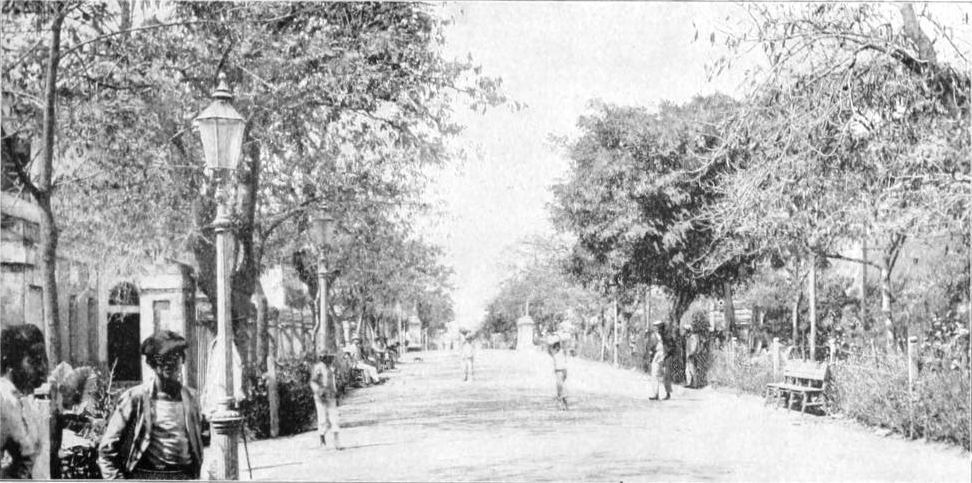
View from midpoint of Paseo de la Princesa towards entrance of promenade in 1898

In 1837, the interim prison of Antigua Prisión La Princesa (The Princess Old Prison), originally known as Real Cárcel La Princesa (The Princess Royal Jail), was first built in the named after Queen Isabella II of Spain, who in 1833 was proclaimed sovereign at the age of three following her father Ferdinand VII’s death.

In 1854, Puerto Rico's Governor and Lieutenant General Don Fernando de Norzagaray foresaw an expansion of the prison and the construction of its tower. The prison had capacity for about 240 prisoners and continued to operate until 1965.

While the promenade itself dates to the 1850s, its location was originally used by the Spanish military as a cleared field of fire for the cannons and guns that were located outside of the Walls of Old San Juan.

The promenade and surrounding areas fell into disrepair during the 20th century, but it was rehabilitated and restored in 1989. The Puerto Rico Tourism Company is now headquartered at the former prison. The company also installed a time capsule in 1995, located under the promenade section in front of the historic building. The time capsule was opened in 2020, and two more were installed afterwards. These capsules are stated to be opened in 2045. La Princesa prison building also houses a small art exhibition and often hosts cultural events.

== Gallery ==
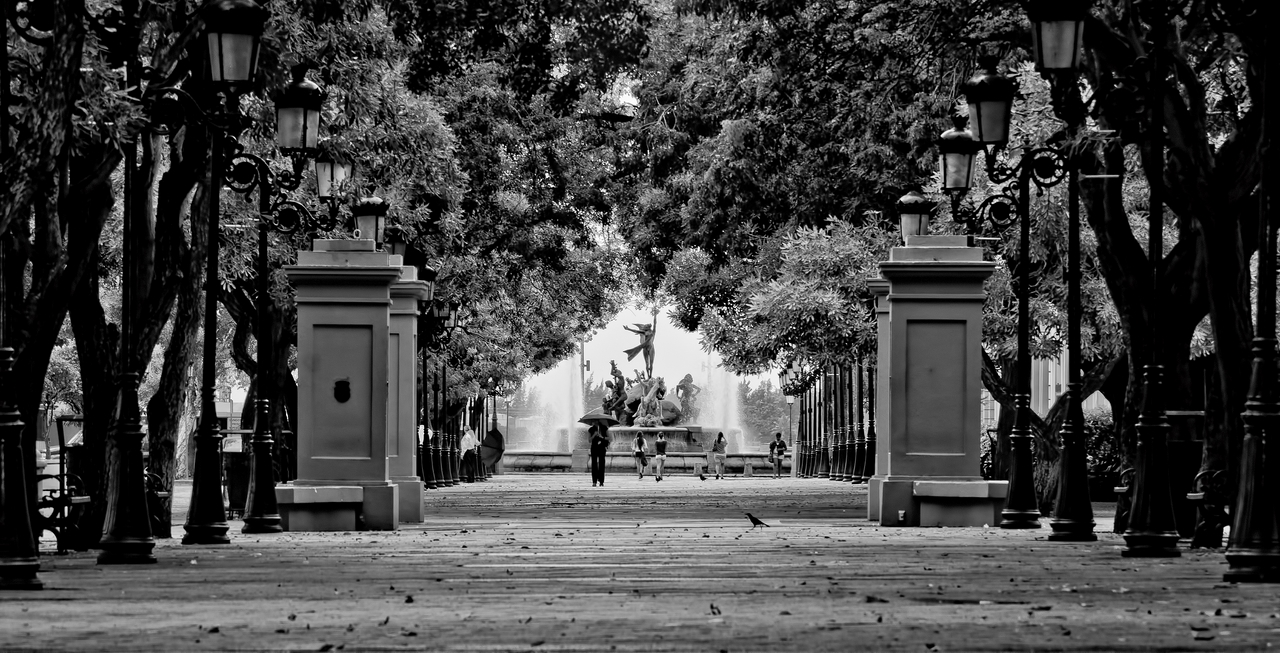
View of La Princesa and Raíces Fountain from the eastern end of the promenade

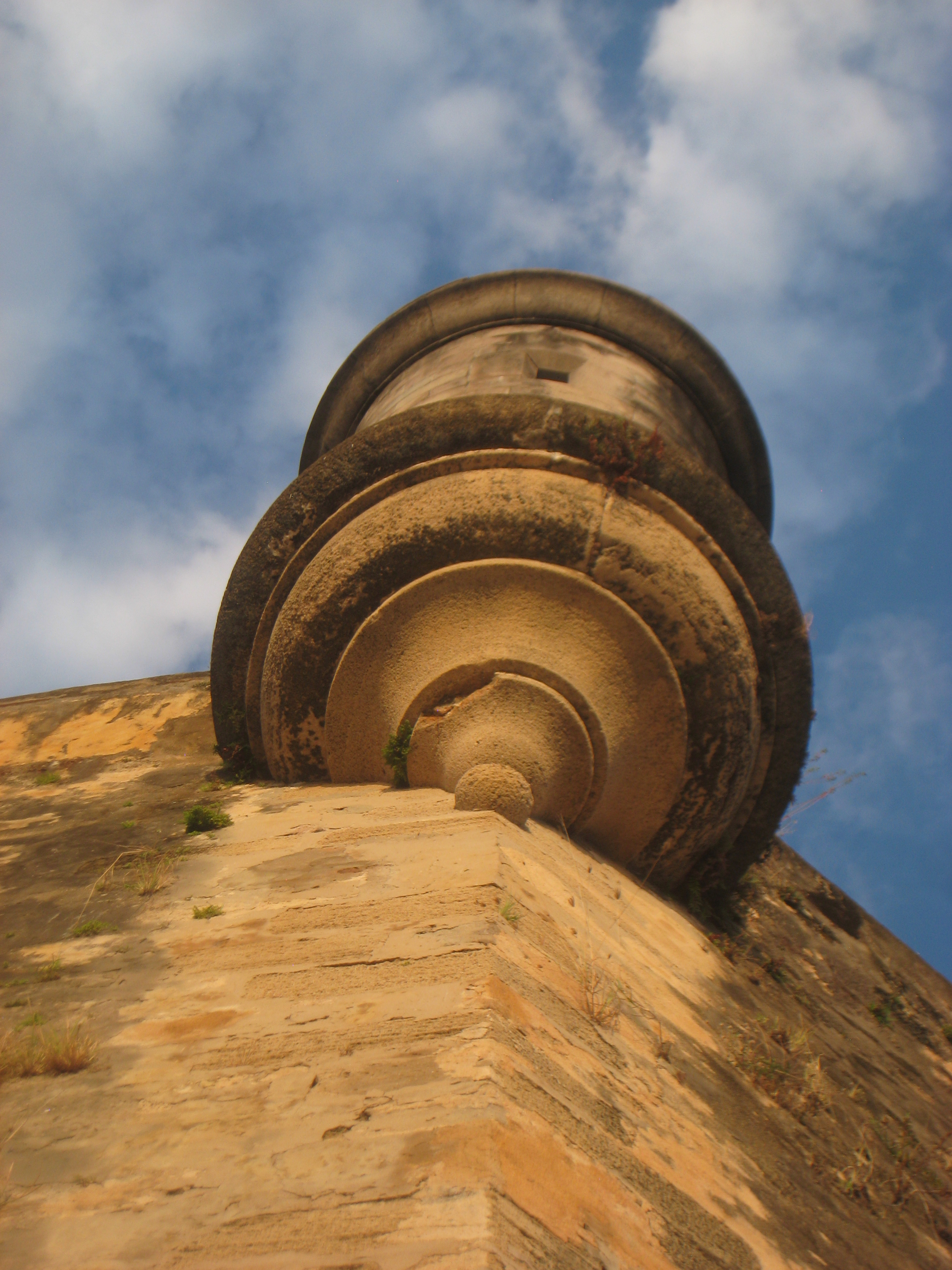
A garita on the Derecha de San Justo Bastion located near the eastern end of the promenade

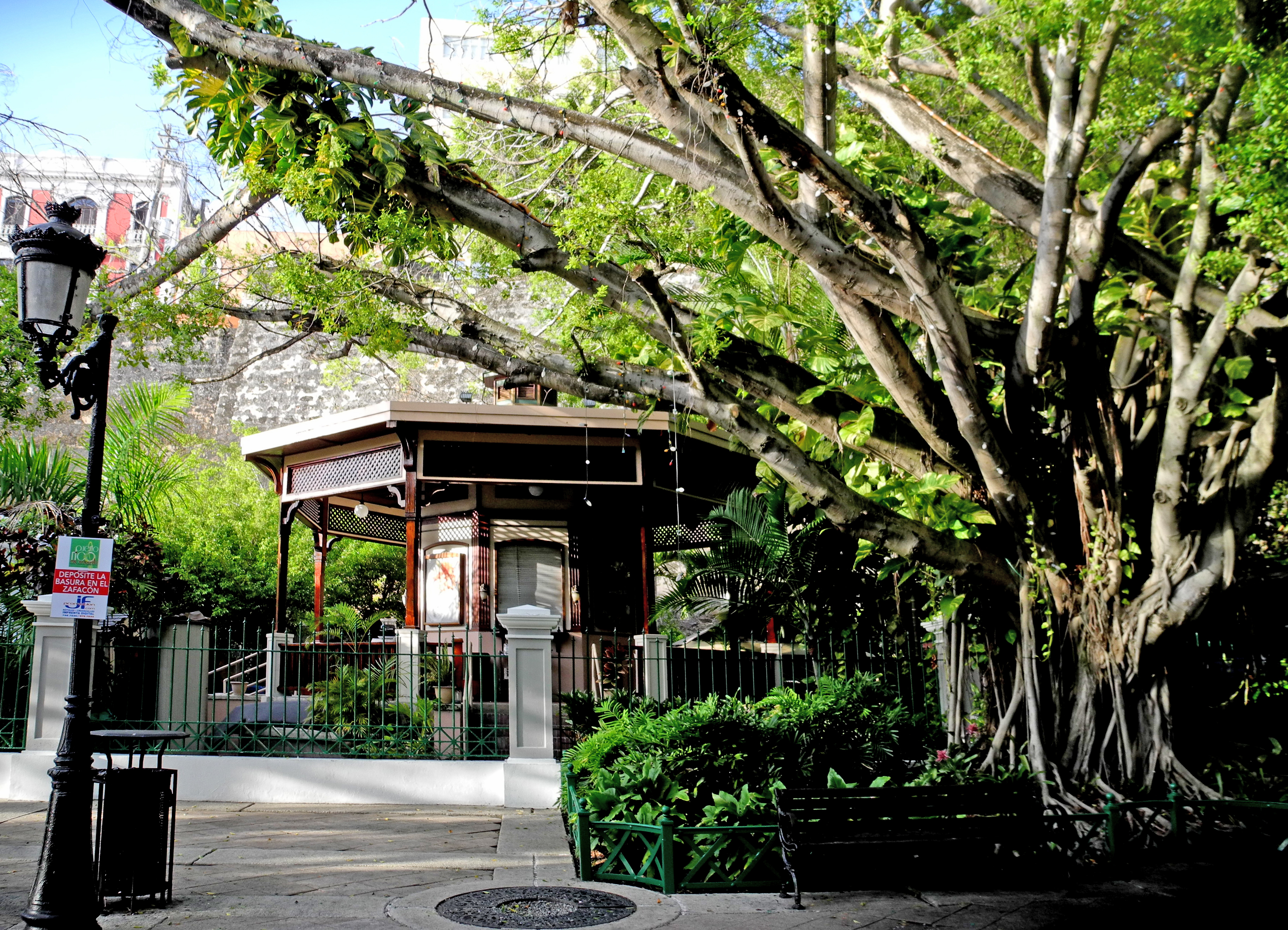
Open air café in La Princesa

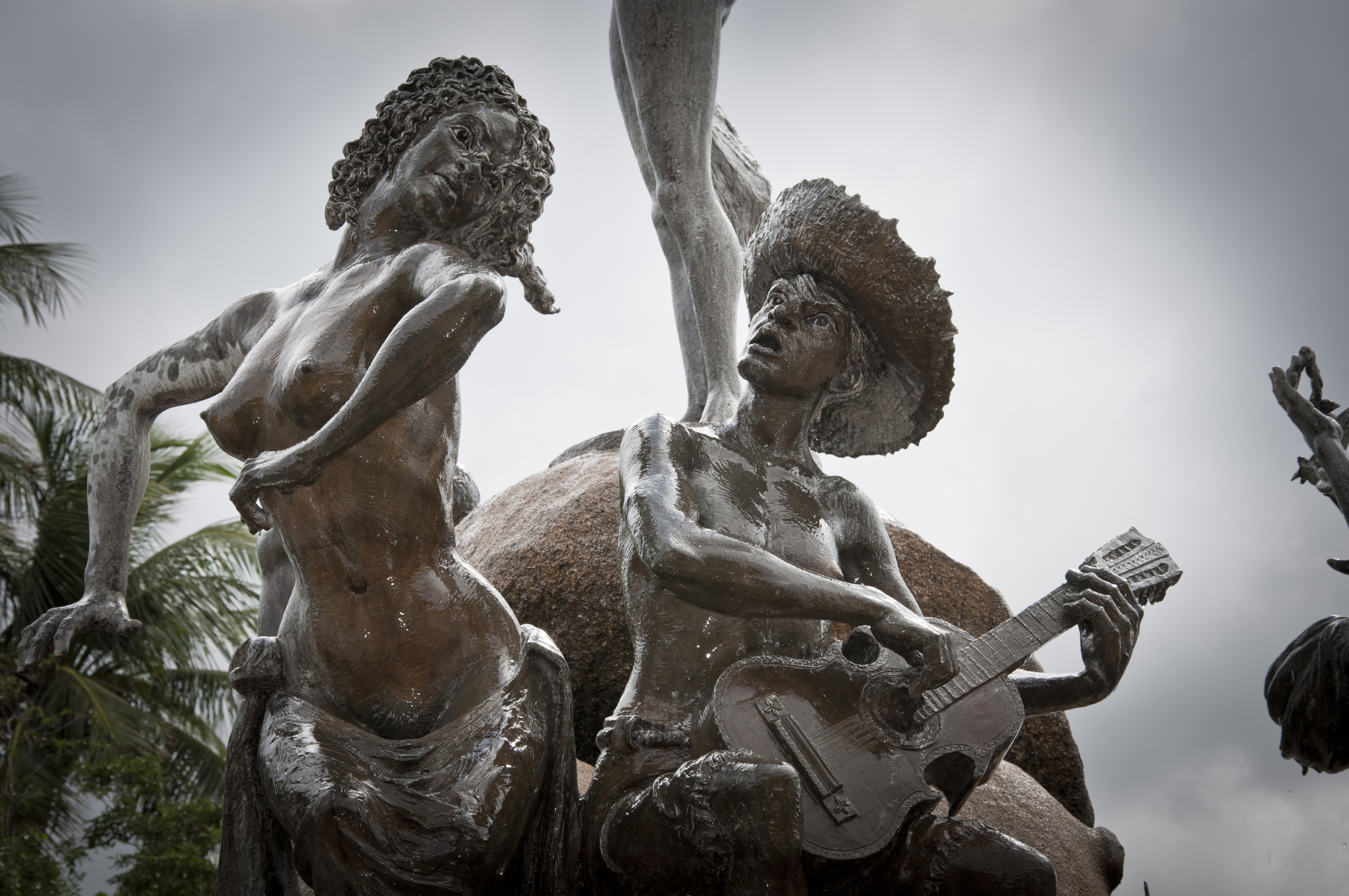
Closeup of some of the sculptures of the Raíces Fountain

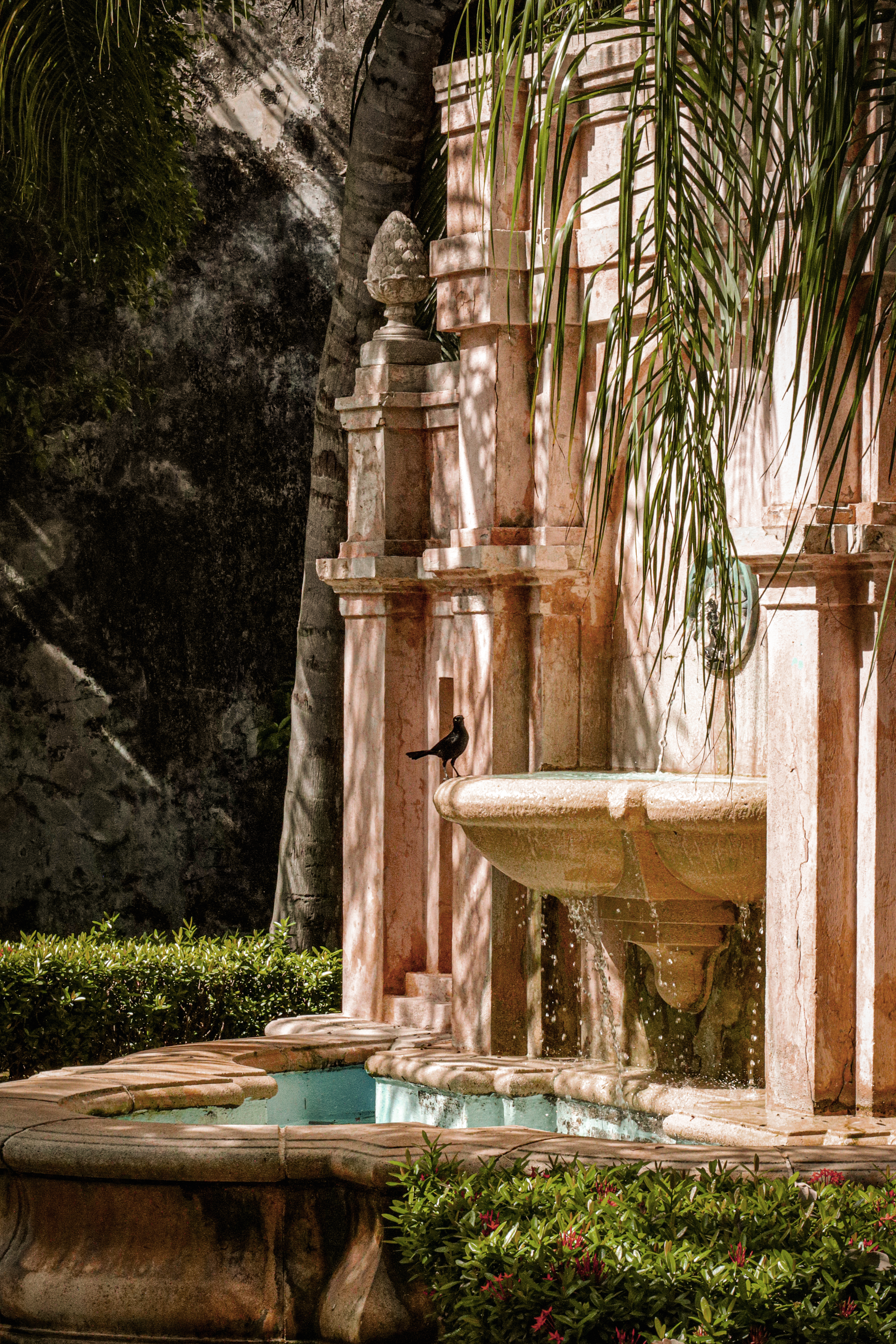
Greater Antillean grackle (chango) in a fountain of the paseo

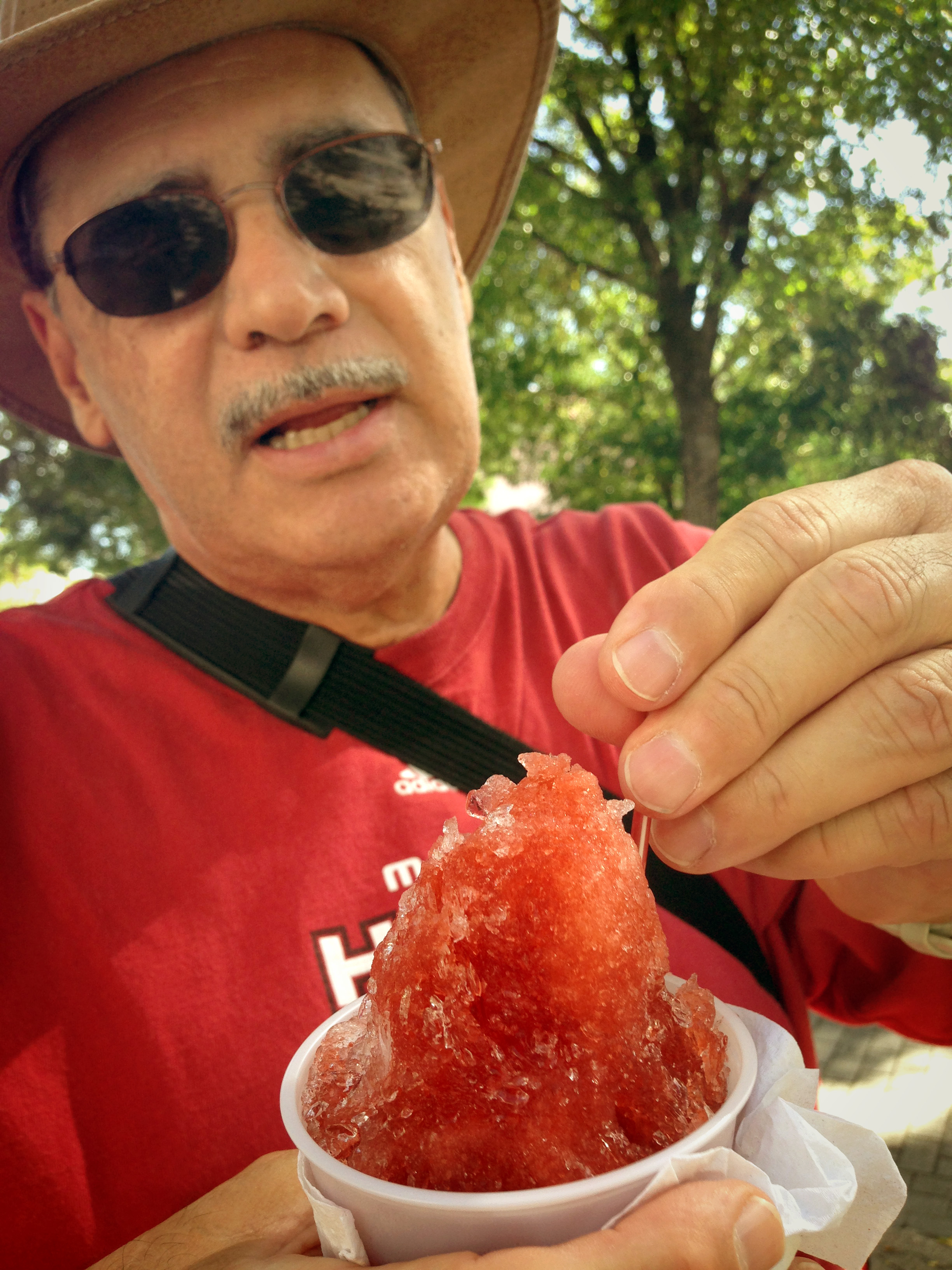
Man eating a piragua (Puerto Rican shaved ice) in Paseo de la Princesa in 2014

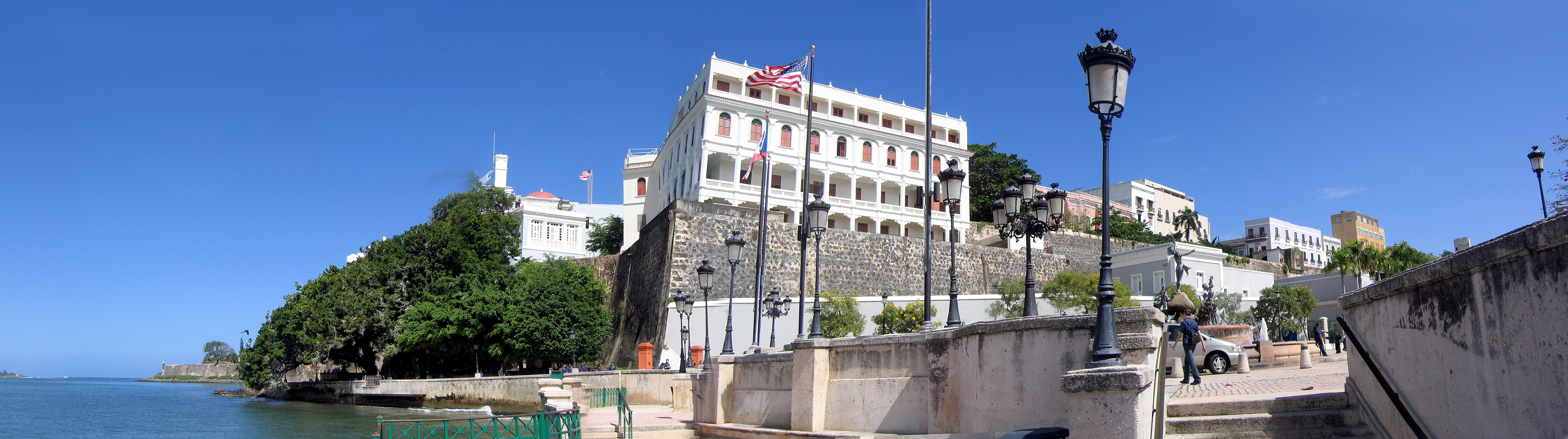
View of La Fortaleza and La Concepción Bastion from the western end of La Princesa

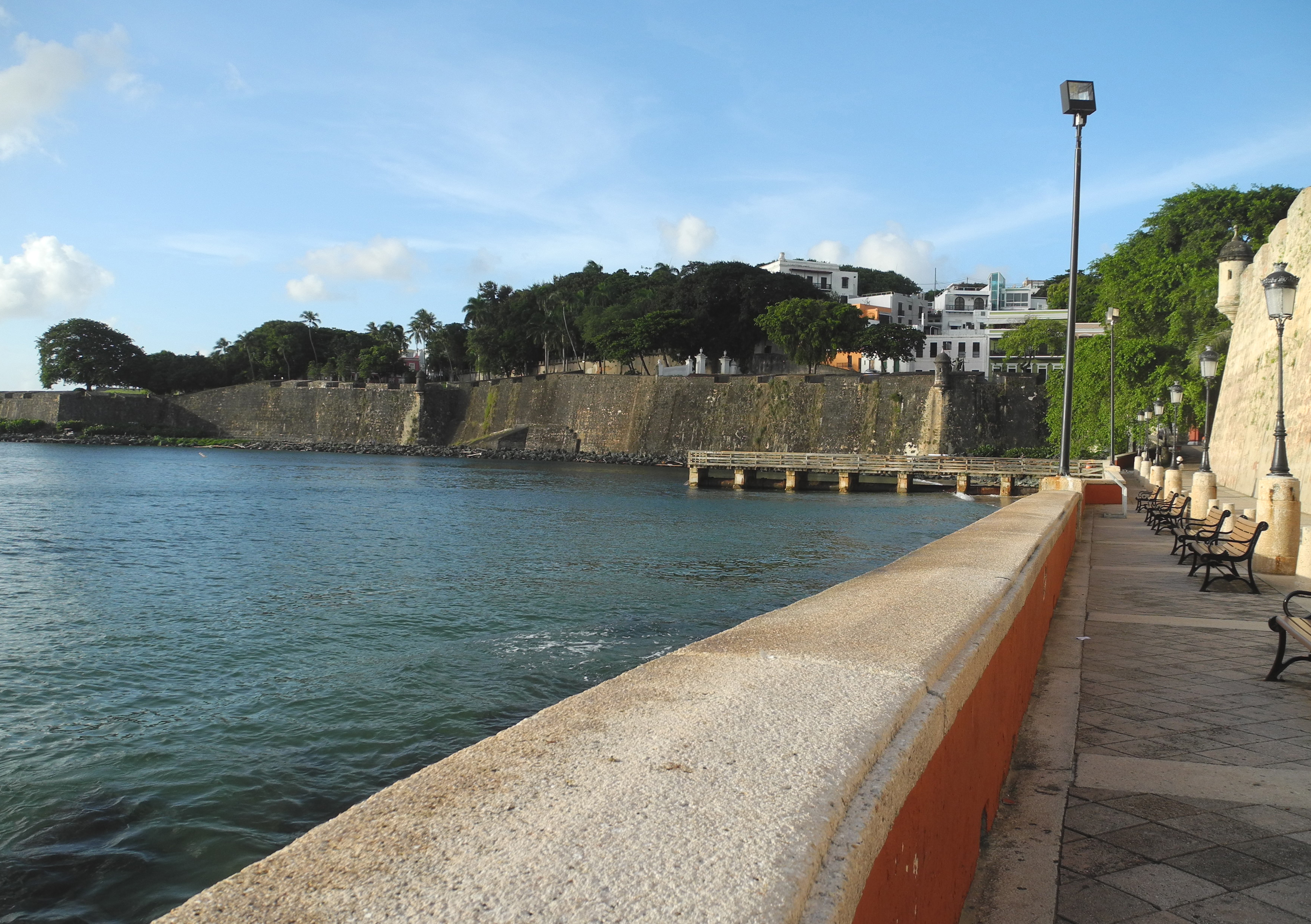
Western section of Walls of Old San Juan next to promenade

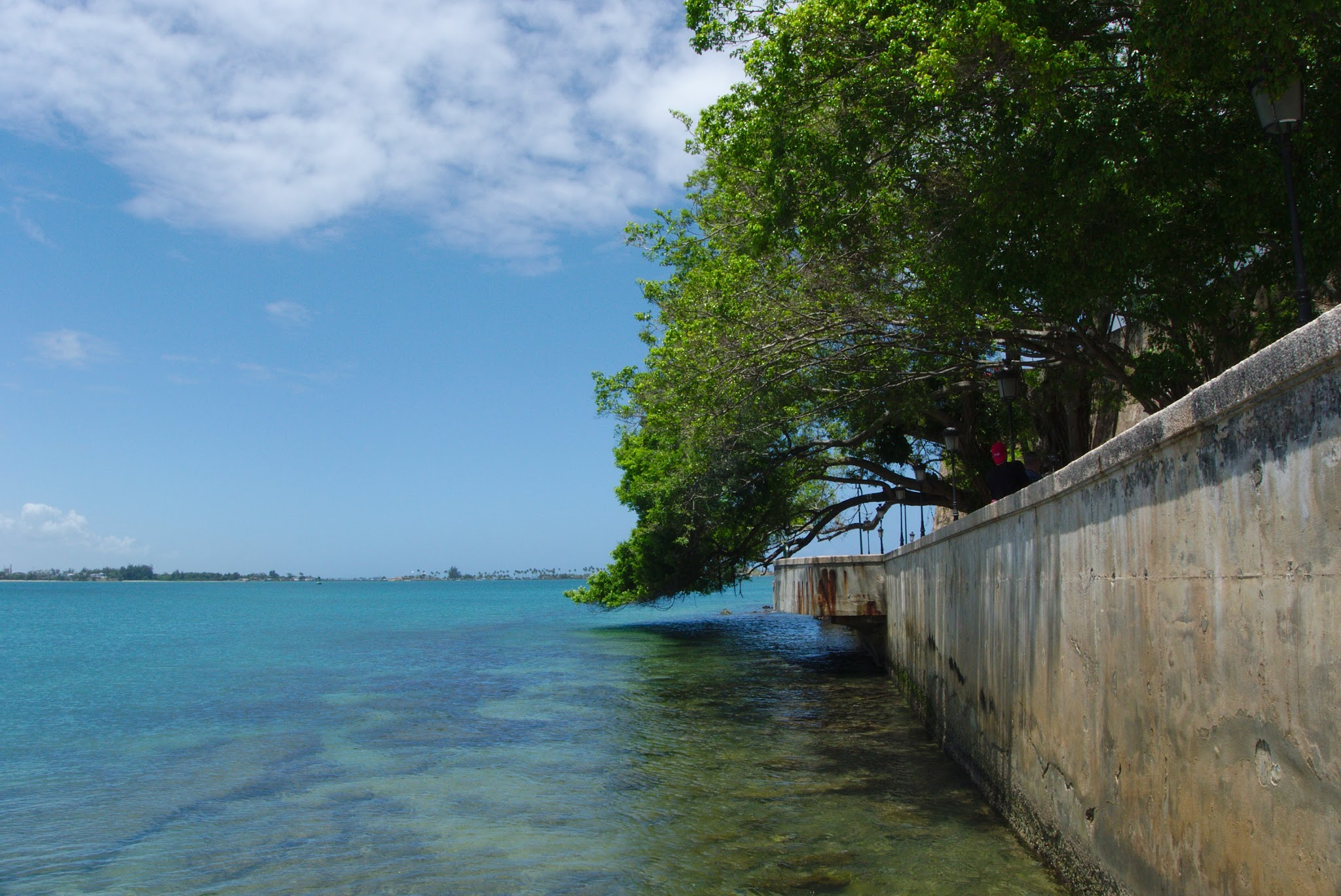
View of Isla de Cabras across San Juan Bay

== See also ==
- List of streets in San Juan, Puerto Rico
