= Casa Blanca (San Juan) =

16th-century house museum in Old San Juan, Puerto Rico

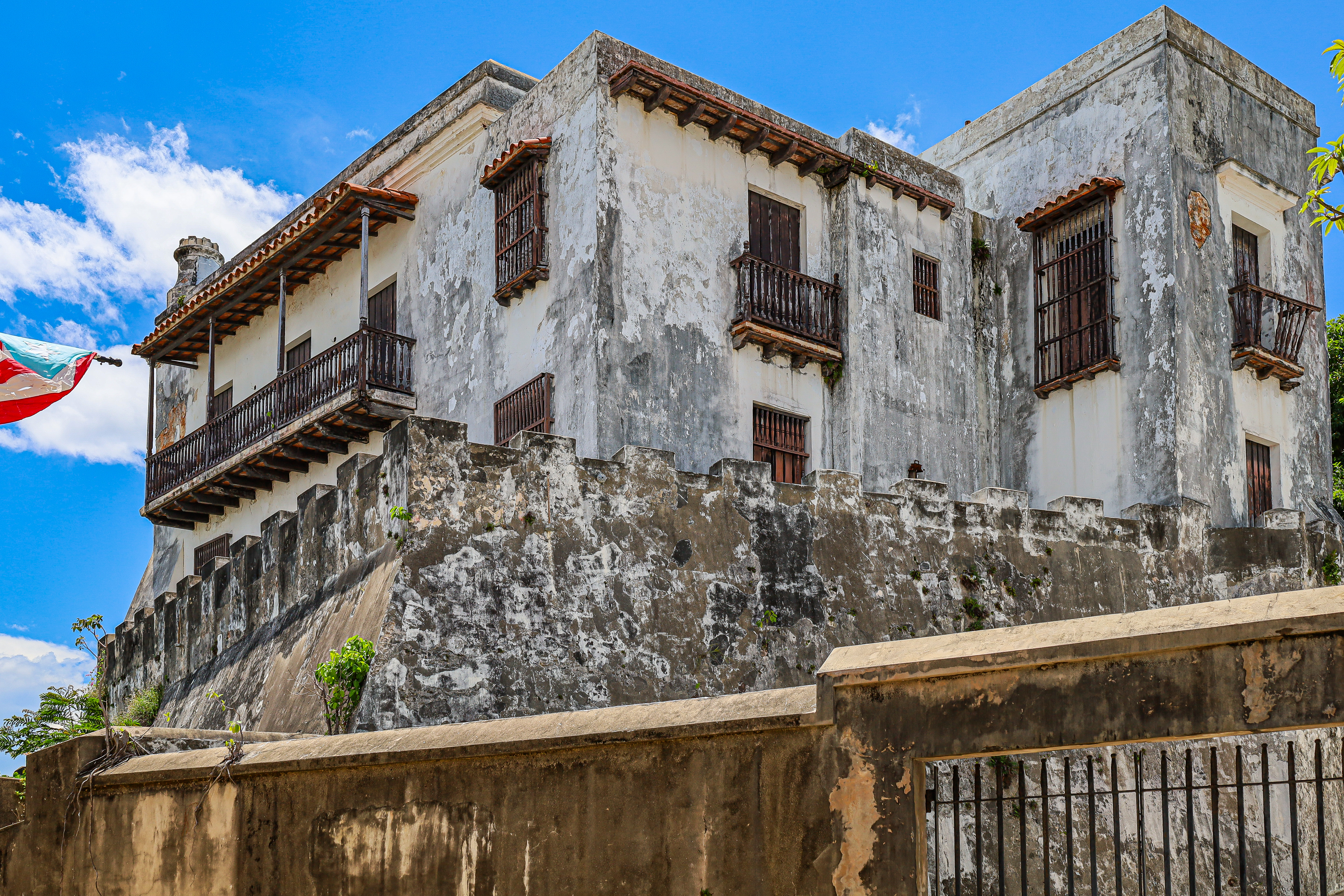
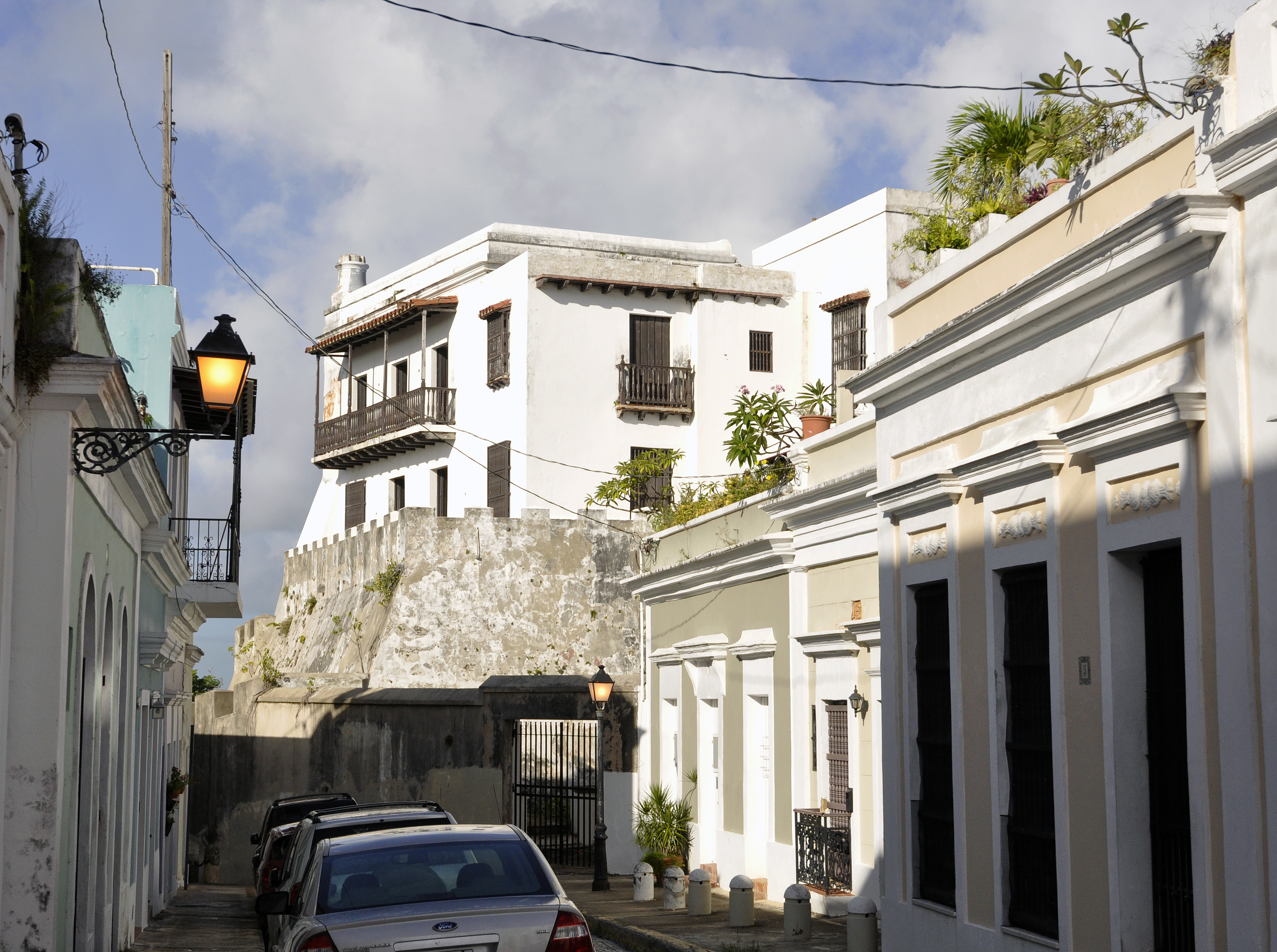
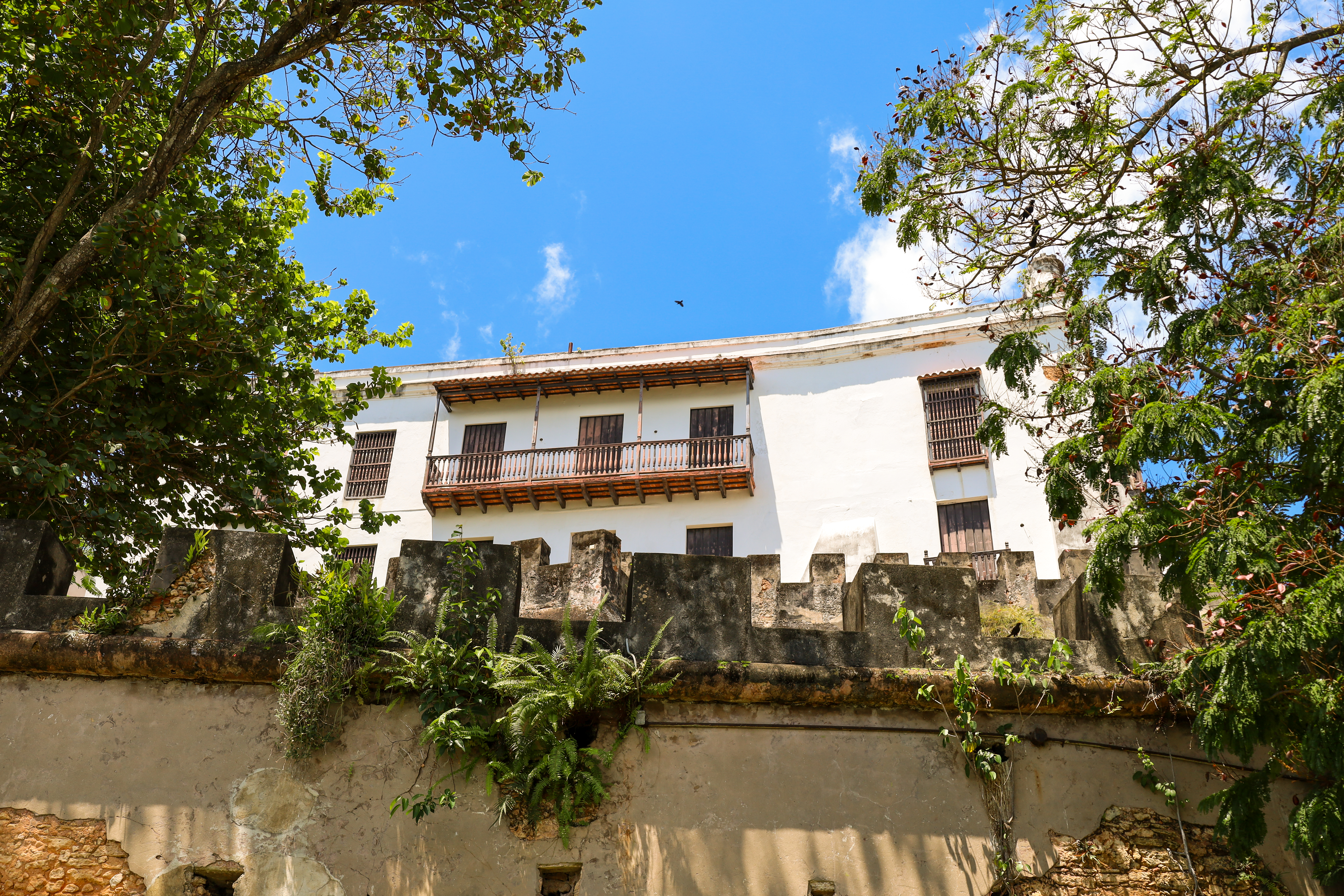
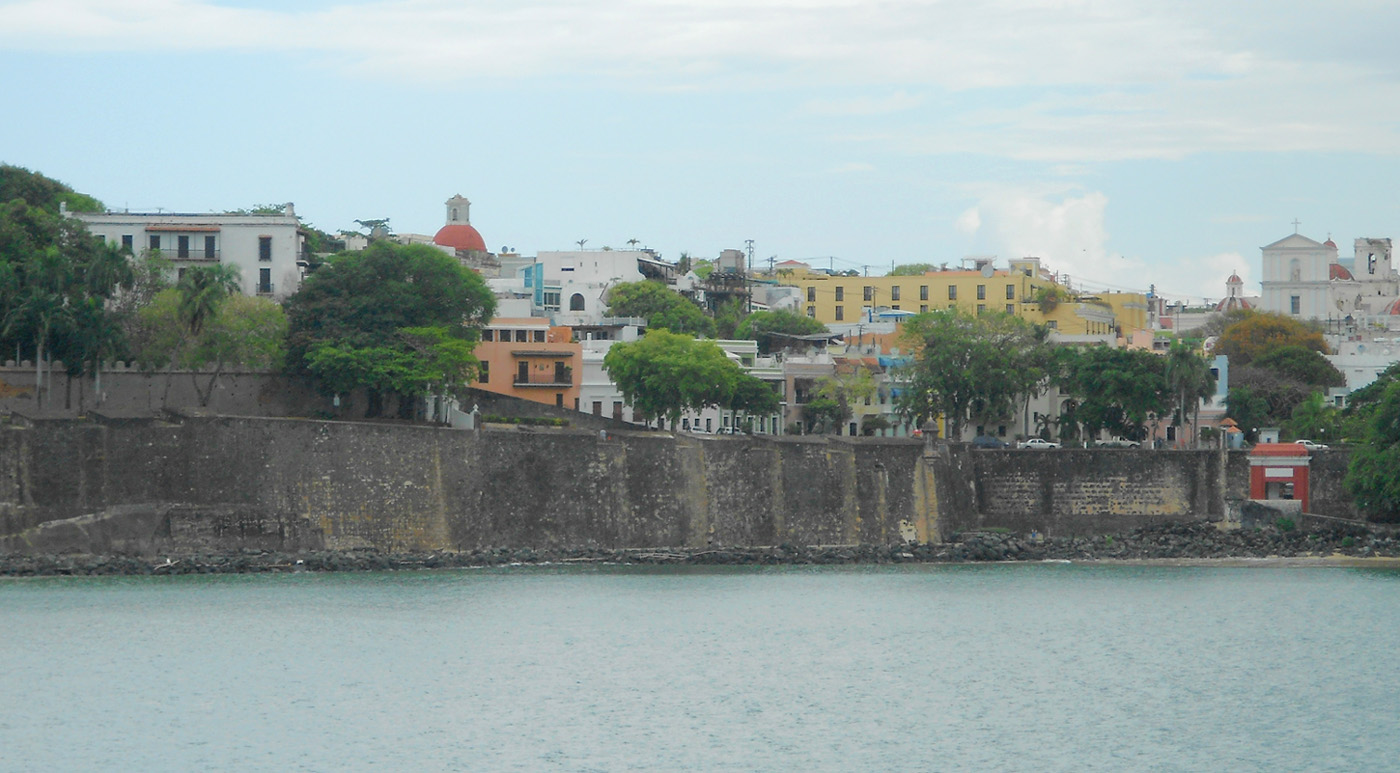
- From top, left to right: Close-up view of southeastern façade of Casa Blanca from Calle del Sol (Sun Street); wide view of southeastern façade of Casa Blanca; close-up view of southwestern façade of Casa Blanca; panoramic view of southwestern façade of Casa Blanca (far left) from San Juan Bay within the Walls of Old San Juan and above Paseo del Morro
- Interactive map
- 18°27′58″N 66°7′12″W
- Location: Old San Juan, San Juan, Puerto Rico

History
- Built: 1523–1525
- Built for: Juan Ponce de León

Site notes
- Architectural style: Spanish Colonial
- Governing body: Institute of Puerto Rican Culture

U.S. National Historic Landmark District – Contributing property
- Designated: October 10, 1972
- Part of: Old San Juan Historic District
- Reference no.: 72001553

Casa Blanca is a historic house museum situated in Old San Juan, the historic district of San Juan, the capital municipality of the archipelago and island of Puerto Rico. In 1967, Casa Blanca was transferred to the Puerto Rican government and designated a historical monument. It was documented in the Historic American Buildings Survey in 1981 and currently operates as a museum showcasing 16th and 17th-century artifacts, administered by the Institute of Puerto Rican Culture.

== History ==
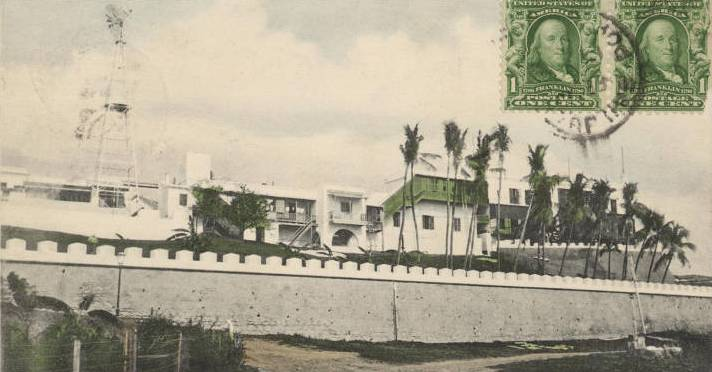
Western façade of Casa Blanca facing San Juan Bay, 1904

Constructed in 1521, Casa Blanca served as the initial fortification for the San Juan islet and was intended to be the residence of Juan Ponce de León and his family. However, de León passed away during an expedition to Florida without ever residing in the house. Subsequently, it sheltered his descendants until the mid-18th century. Building began in 1521, following the move of the capital from Caparra to San Juan (then Puerto Rico city). The first building was made from wood. Afterwards, a new masonry building was completed by García Troche. During conflicts with the Taíno, it provided refuge, and was the venue for negotiations between the conquistadores and a commission of caciques (chieftains) facilitated a resolution to a brief uprising.

When the capital transitioned to the San Juan Islet, Casa Blanca became the first governor's residence in Puerto Rico. Despite undergoing numerous refurbishments over five centuries, it remained the governors' residence until the mid-1700s when Castle-Fortress of St. Catherine was modernized and reborn as the Royal Site of the Palace of St. Catherine of Siena. The building lost its official status despite remaining the house of the Ponce de León family. In 1779, the Ponce de León family sold the house to the Spanish government. Casa Blanca was then used to house engineers involved in the construction of more fortifications. It was later used for the teaching of firearm use and housed several military officers. During the 18th and 19th centuries, the building was modified multiple times.

In 1898, the building was transferred to the United States military following the Spanish-American War. It then housed the head of the Antillean Command and his family, undergoing more modifications. Some efforts were later made to restore it. In 1939, colonel John W. Wright received WPA funds to modify the roofs, add a terrace and a balcony with balusters in the area adjacent to the interior patio. For this process he contracted Spanish architects "who lived, or were passing through, Puerto Rico". Subsequently, Casa Blanca housed various military and chivalry organizations before gradually falling into disuse post-World War II. It was rejuvenated by the Puerto Rican Institute of Culture, and its gardens, planted by General Brooks (the first American Military governor of the island in the 20th century), were preserved. General Roland H. Del Mar lived at Casa Blanca between 1961-63, attempting to restore it to its original form.

Rumors that Roberto Sánchez Vilella intended to make Casa Blanca its residence and make La Fortaleza an office circulated, but never materialized. The idea was opposed by Institute of Puerto Rican Culture (ICP) director Ricardo Alegría, who intervened before the move could take place. It was recognized as a historic building open to the public on an initiative of senator Antonio Fernós Isern and then designated to be transferred for restoration and preservation. On June 21, 1968, Law 105 transferred Casa Blanca to the agency. Alegría's initial idea was for it to serve as a XVI century museum. However, governor Luis A. Ferré granted a request from San Juan mayor to use it as residence. The director resisted the idea and refused handing over the keys, citing that the Senate had assigned the ICP the task of restoring it bringing in the legislature because he knew that it was controlled by the opposition (the Popular Democratic Party of Puerto Rico) and would not revoke the arrangement.

Alegría was able to continue the effort, collaborating with architect Eladio López in the study of the building's original blueprints and beginning the restoration in April 1969. The process began with the gardens, which included a small public park with Arabic-style fountains and canals. Prior to the competition of the work, the building hosted a concert in September 1970, attracting around 700 guests. The event marked the first time in the building's history that a large civilian contingent was allowed into the formerly official building. Plays and academic activities were also held in the premises. The museum was expended to include the XVII century and was inaugurated on November 19, 1974. This delighted the director, who considered it "symbolic".

It was noted that the multiple alterations "could not erase its somber, martial environment". Maps, furnishing, items and an ark that symbolized the task given to the Ponce de León family as guardians of the royal documents, were exhibited. The Office of Cultural Affairs which was created for Alegría after leaving the ICP in 1973, was housed within Casa Blanca. An addition that had been built by the Spaniards to house soldiers was used for this purpose. A piece published by the San Juan Star made the claim that José de Casanova had confessed to Otis R. Cold of the 65th Infantry Regiment that a secret room had been discovered under the floor, where a safe was housed before sealing it again.

Alegría created the Center for Advanced Studies on Puerto Rico and the Caribbean (CEAPRC) and housed it at Casa Blanca on August 29, 1977, loaning the historical jail and post office from the ICP for this purpose. The section was restored and retrofitted for educational activities. He also created a library of Puerto Rican/Caribbean works that began at 9,000 pieces. The newly formed Puerto Rico Endowment for the Humanities also received a space at Casa Blanca. The CEAPRC remained there a decade prior to moving it to the Seminario Concilar de San Idelfonso. The kitchen underwent restoration prior to the turn of the millennium.

== Features ==
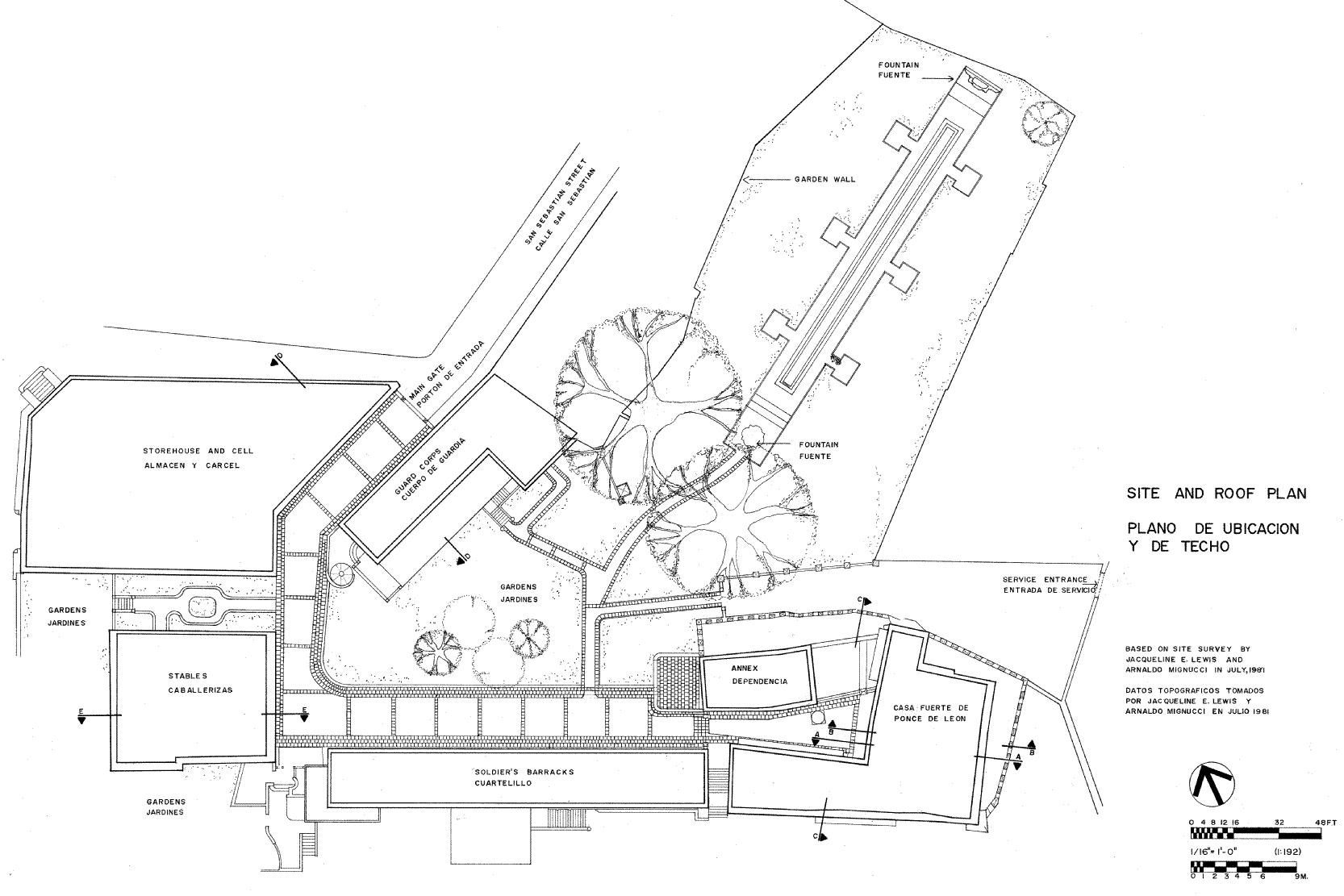
Site and roof plan of Casa Blanca, 1981

The building was built with the invasion of natives, pirates and foreign powers in mind, on a promontory overseeing the San Juan Bay. It its furnished with solid walls and terraces for guards and artillery. There are also hidden passages. The interiors, however, display characteristics of everyday household life during the early colonial period, particularly the design of the kitchen with several coal fireplaces, the recessed cupboards in the dining room and in the windows present in rooms. A large "throne room" served to coordinate military strategies and lay out plans.

== Gallery ==
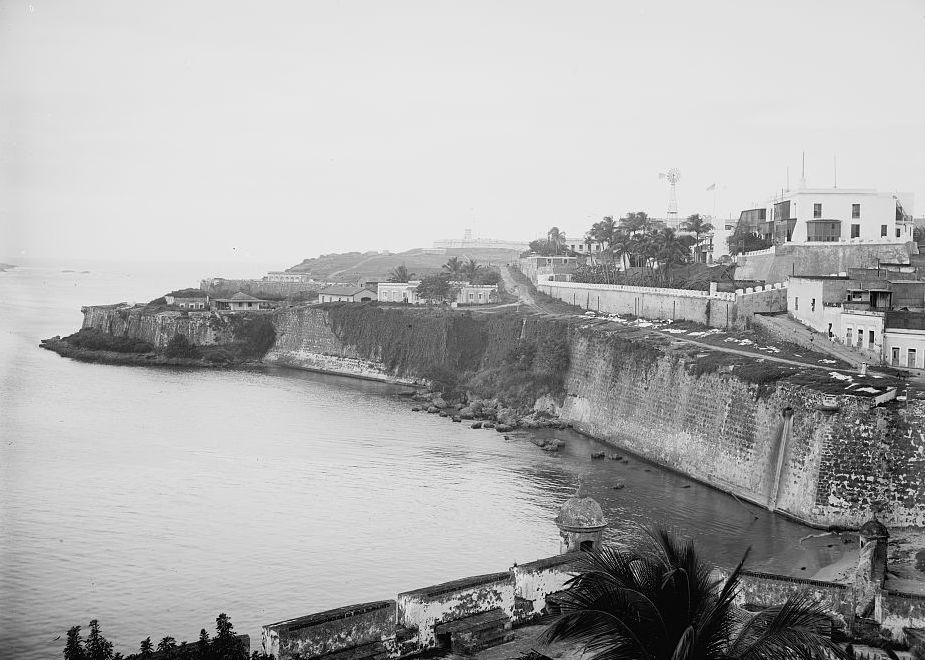
Casa Blanca and city wall, 1903

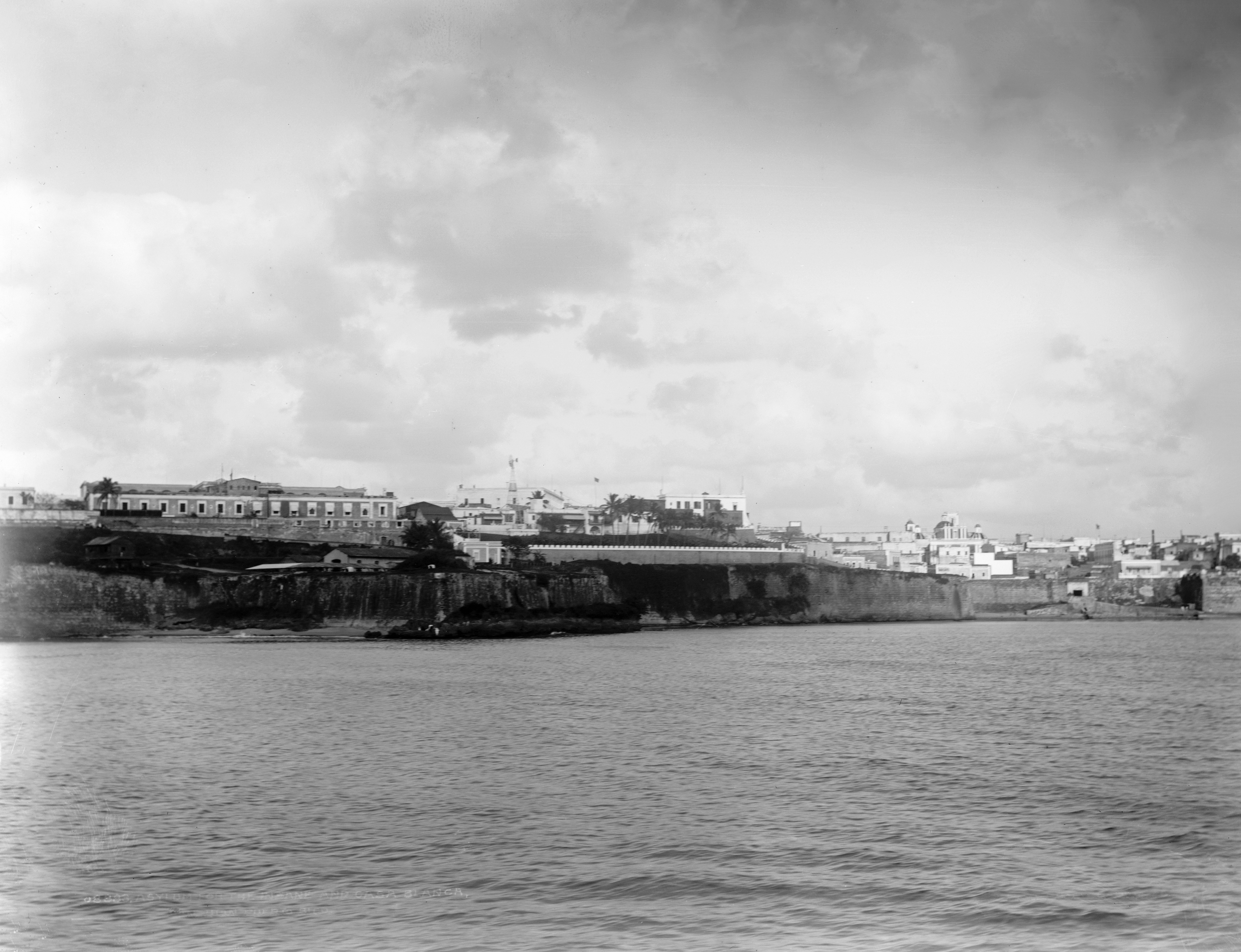
Casa Blanca and city wall, 1904

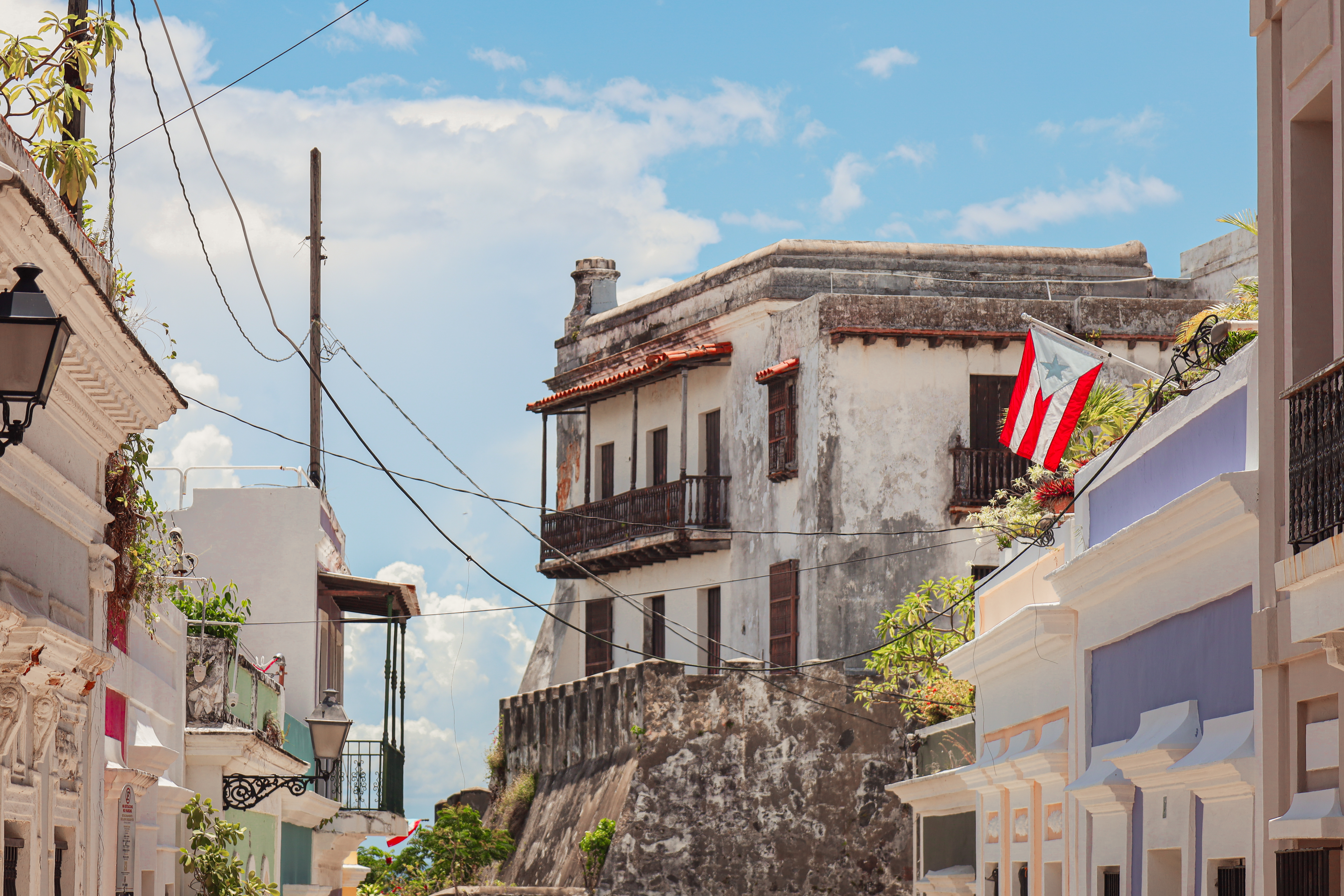
Casa Blanca, Calle del Sol side, 2025

== See also ==
- La Fortaleza
- San José Church
- Old San Juan
- List of the oldest buildings in Puerto Rico
