= Catedral, Old San Juan =

Subbarrio of San Juan Antiguo in Puerto Rico

Catedral
- Subbarrio
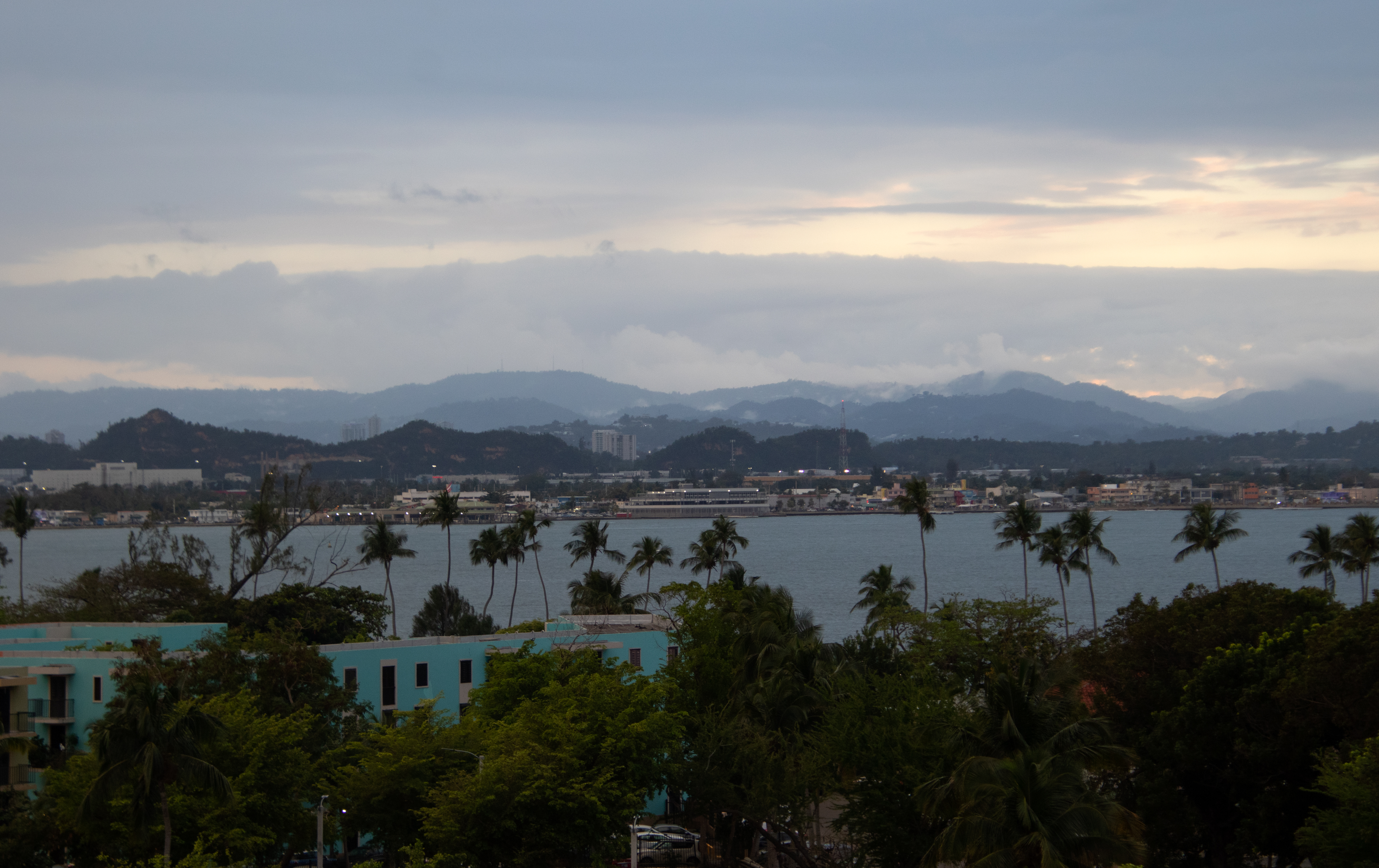
- View from Calle del Cristo and Calle del Tetuán in Catedral

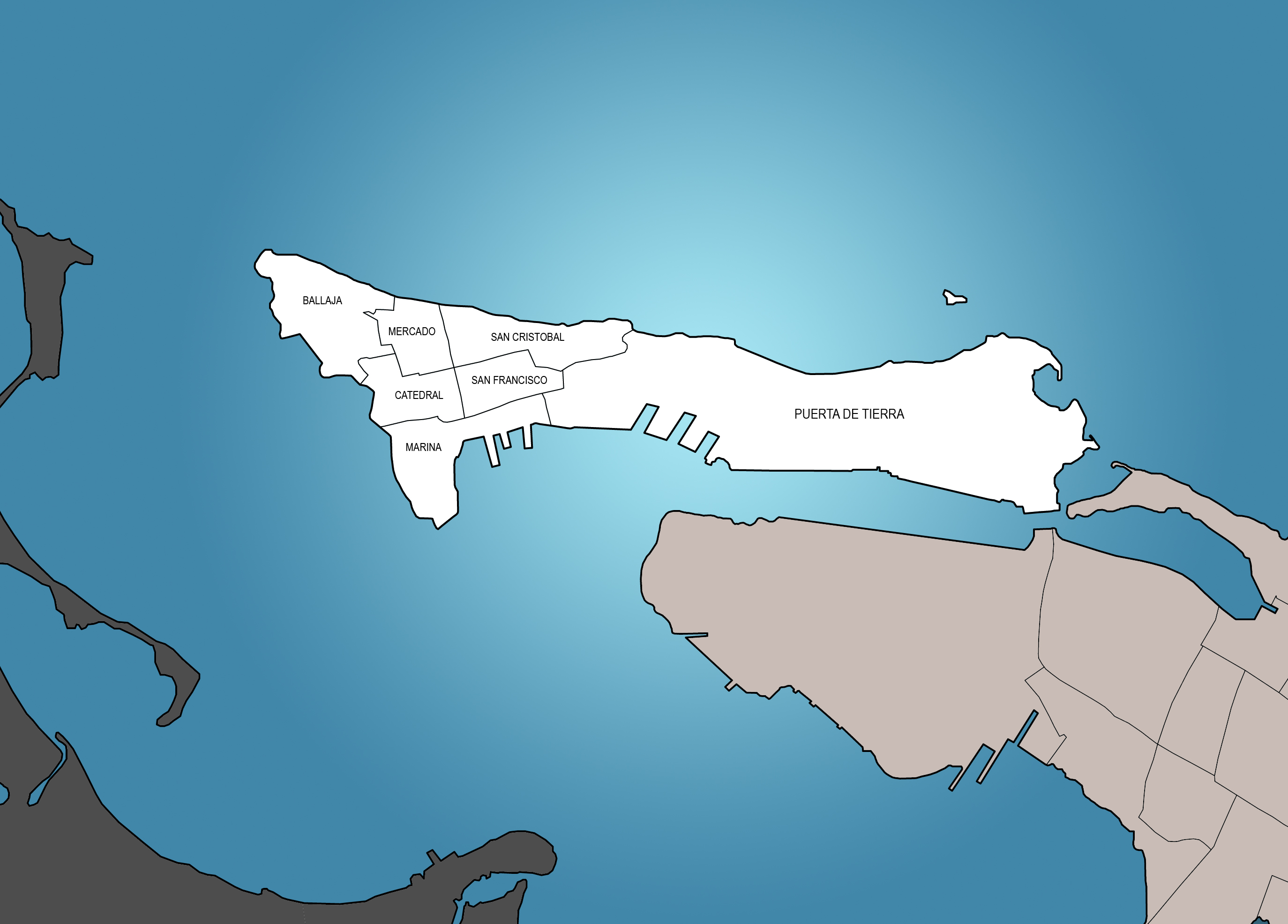
- Catedral is in San Juan Antiguo

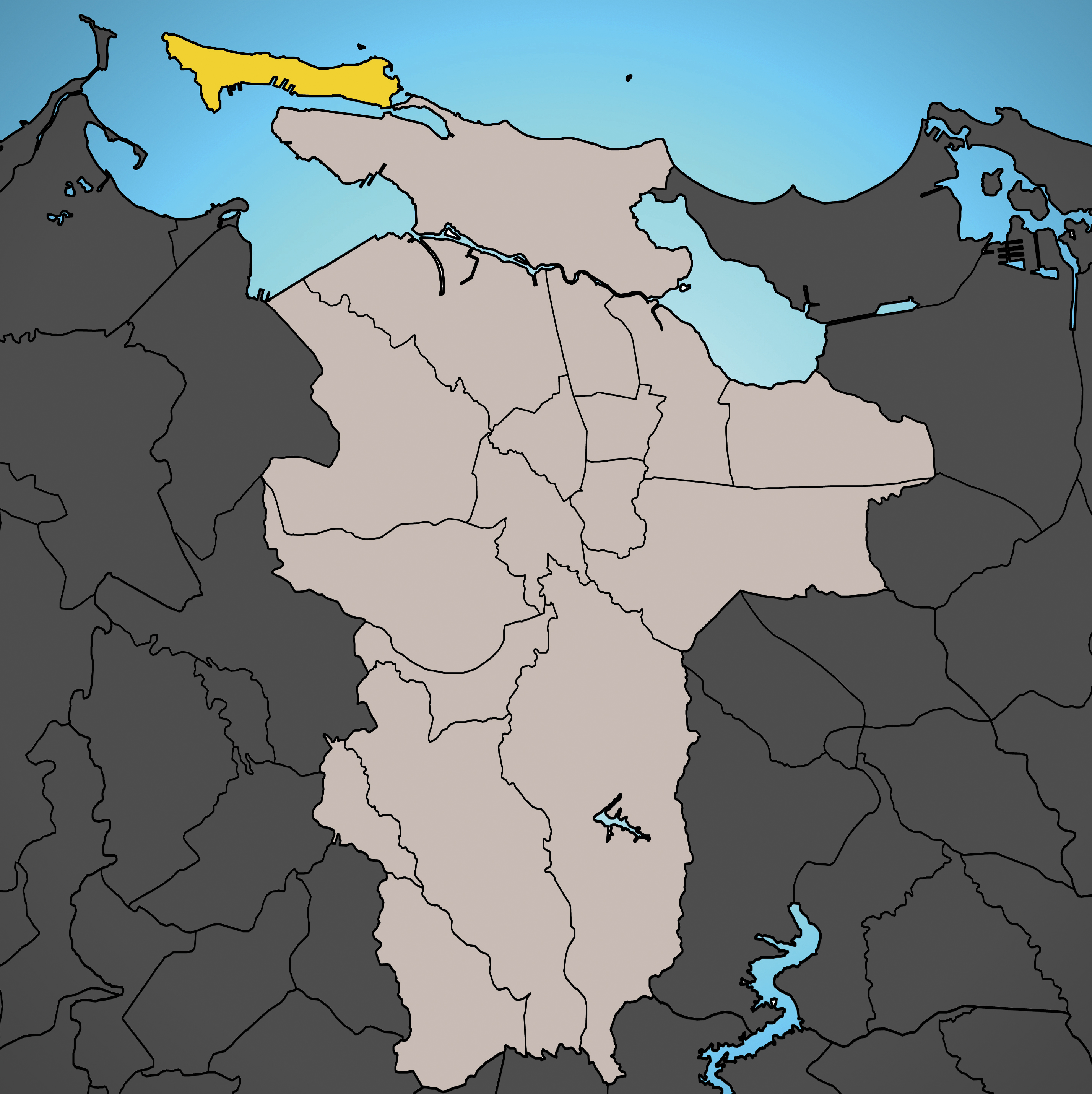
- San Juan Antiguo is in San Juan

- San Juan is in Puerto Rico
- Coordinates: 18.4645589°N 66.1191550°W
- Commonwealth: Puerto Rico
- Municipality: San Juan
- Barrio: San Juan Antiguo

Catedral is one of 7 subbarrios of the San Juan Antiguo barrio in the municipality of San Juan in Puerto Rico. Catedral, named after the Cathedral of San Juan Bautista, is one of the six subbarrios which form part of the Old San Juan Historic District.

== History ==
Having been inhabited since 1511, the Catedral subbarrio represents the oldest portion of Old San Juan, with its namesake cathedral and some of its squares being the oldest established structures in the city. Some of the oldest institutions in the Americas were established here during the 16th century. Additionally, La Fortaleza, the headquarters of the executive branch of the Puerto Rican government, and the Puerto Rico Department of State, are also located in this subbarrio. Originally known as the Barrio de San Juan before the annexation of Santurce and the subsequent dissolution of the previously-established barrios of the city, Catedral still functions as the administrative and historic downtown of the city, containing the cathedral, the city hall and its primary plaza or main town square.

Puerto Rico was ceded by Spain in the aftermath of the Spanish–American War under the terms of the Treaty of Paris of 1898 and became an unincorporated territory of the United States. In 1899, the United States Department of War conducted a census of Puerto Rico finding that the population of Catedral was 2,497.

== Cityscape ==
=== Places of interest ===
- Capilla del Cristo
- Casa Blanca
- Casa del Libro Museum
- Cathedral of San Juan
- El Mundo Building
- Felisa Rincón de Gautier House Museum
- Hotel El Convento
- La Fortaleza
- Palacio de la Real Intendencia
- Parque de las Palomas
- Patio Español Building
- Power y Giralt House
- San Juan City Hall
- San Juan National Historic Site
  - Paseo del Morro
  - Puerta de San Juan
- Santa Ana Church

=== Main streets and squares ===
- Calle de la Cruz
- Calle de la Luna
- Calle del Cristo
- Calle del Sol
- Fortaleza Street
- Plaza de Armas
- Plaza de la Catedral
- Plazuela de la Rogativa
- San Francisco Street
- San José Street
- San Justo Street
- San Sebastián Street
- Tetuán Street

== Demographics ==
Historical population
Census	Pop.	Note	%±
1900	2,497		—
1910	4,331		73.4%
1920	4,243		−2.0%
1930	3,719		−12.3%
1940	3,855		3.7%
1950	3,146		−18.4%
1980	546		—
1990	483		−11.5%
2000	493		2.1%
2010	588		19.3%
U.S. Decennial Census; 1900 (uses 1899 data) 1910-1930; 1930-1950 1980-2000 2010
