= Paseo del Morro =

Promenade in the historic district of San Juan, Puerto Rico

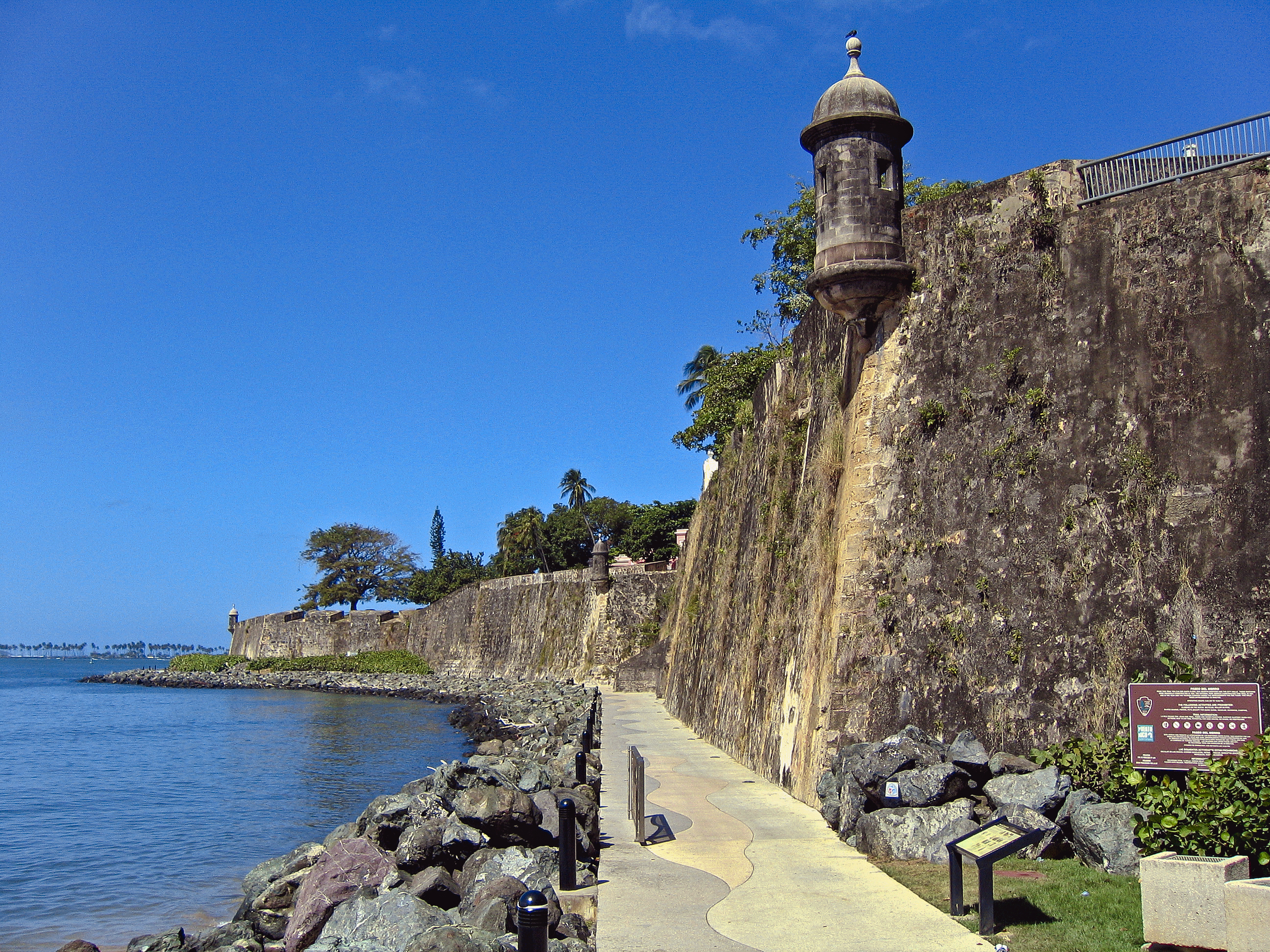
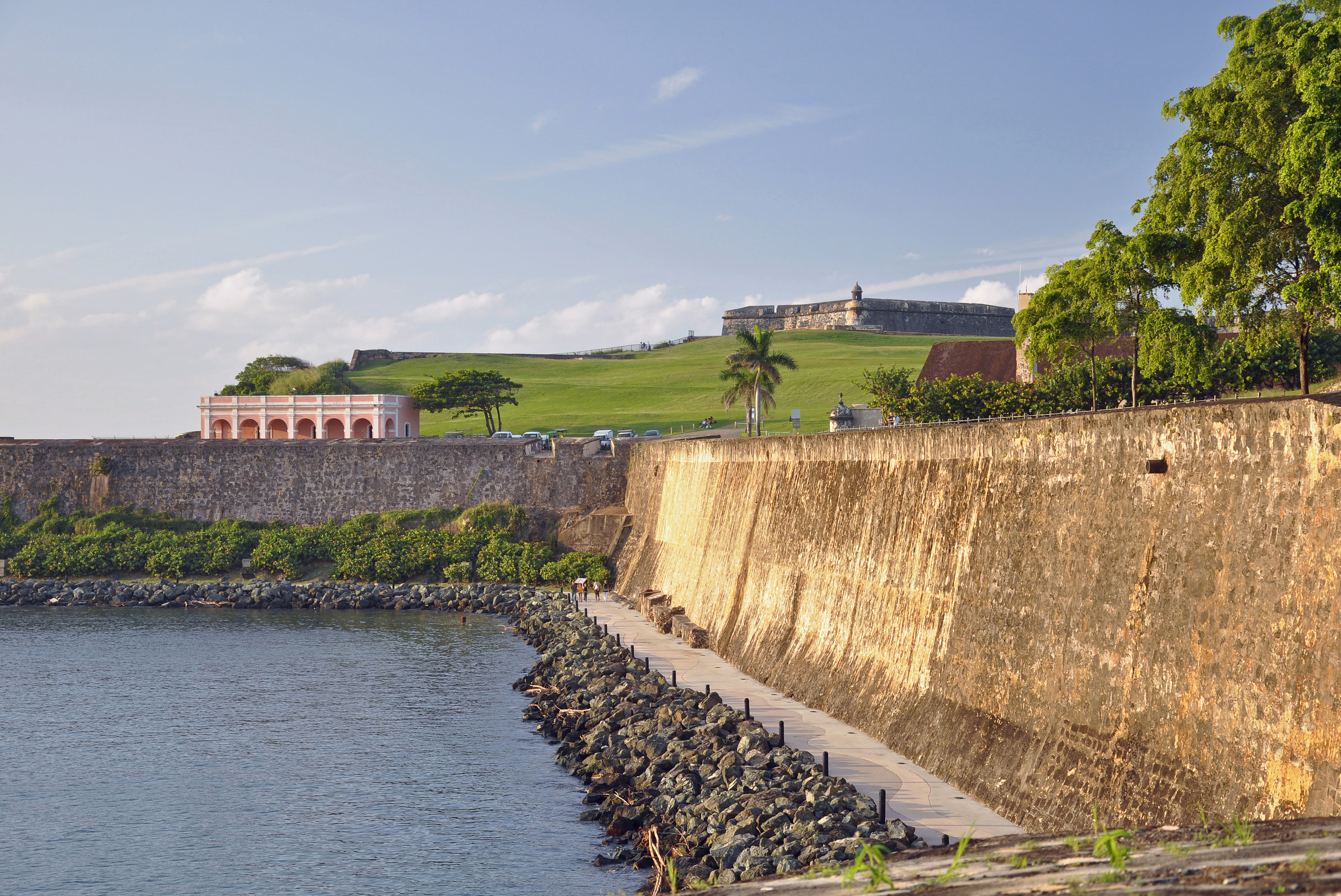
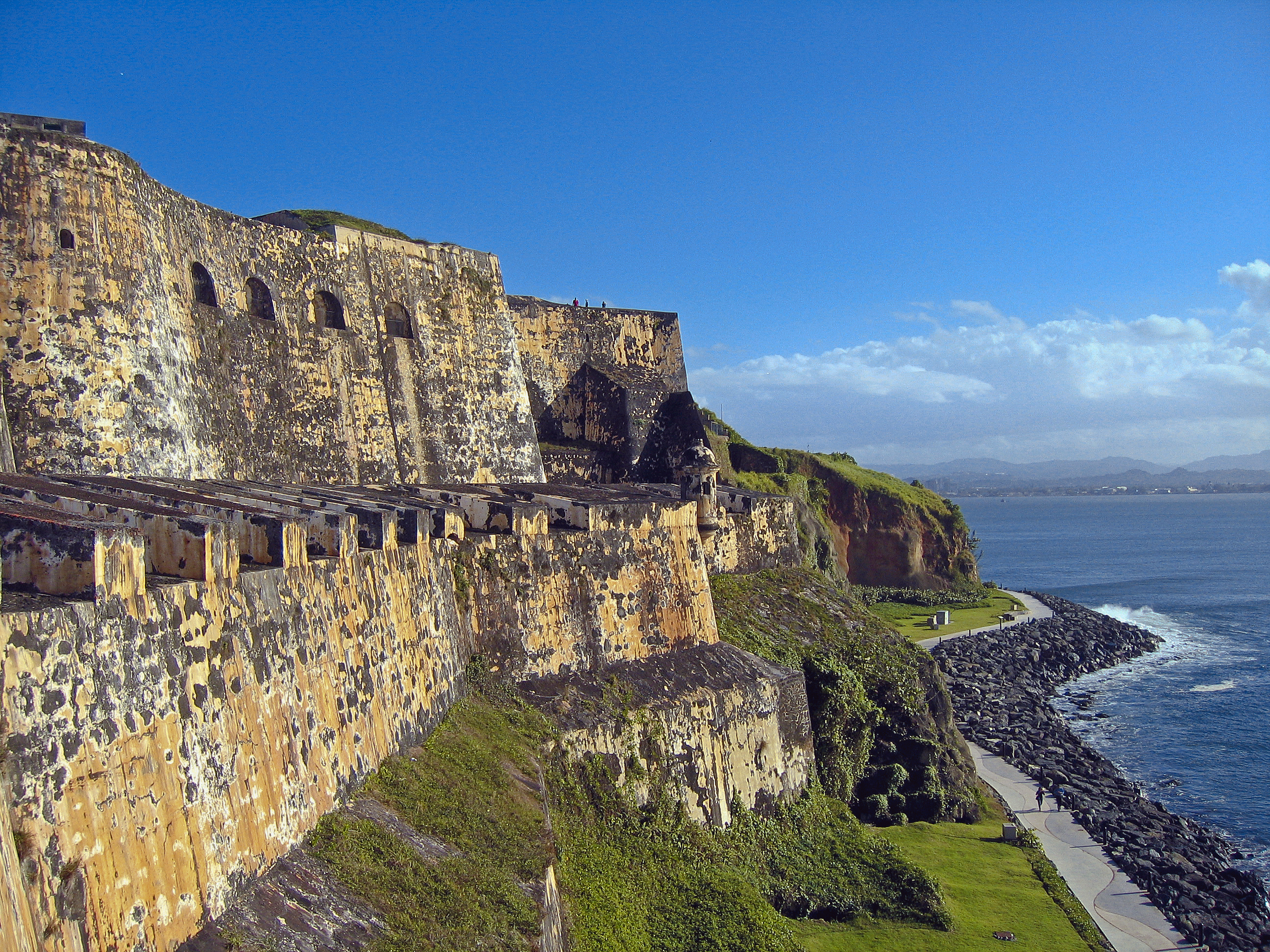
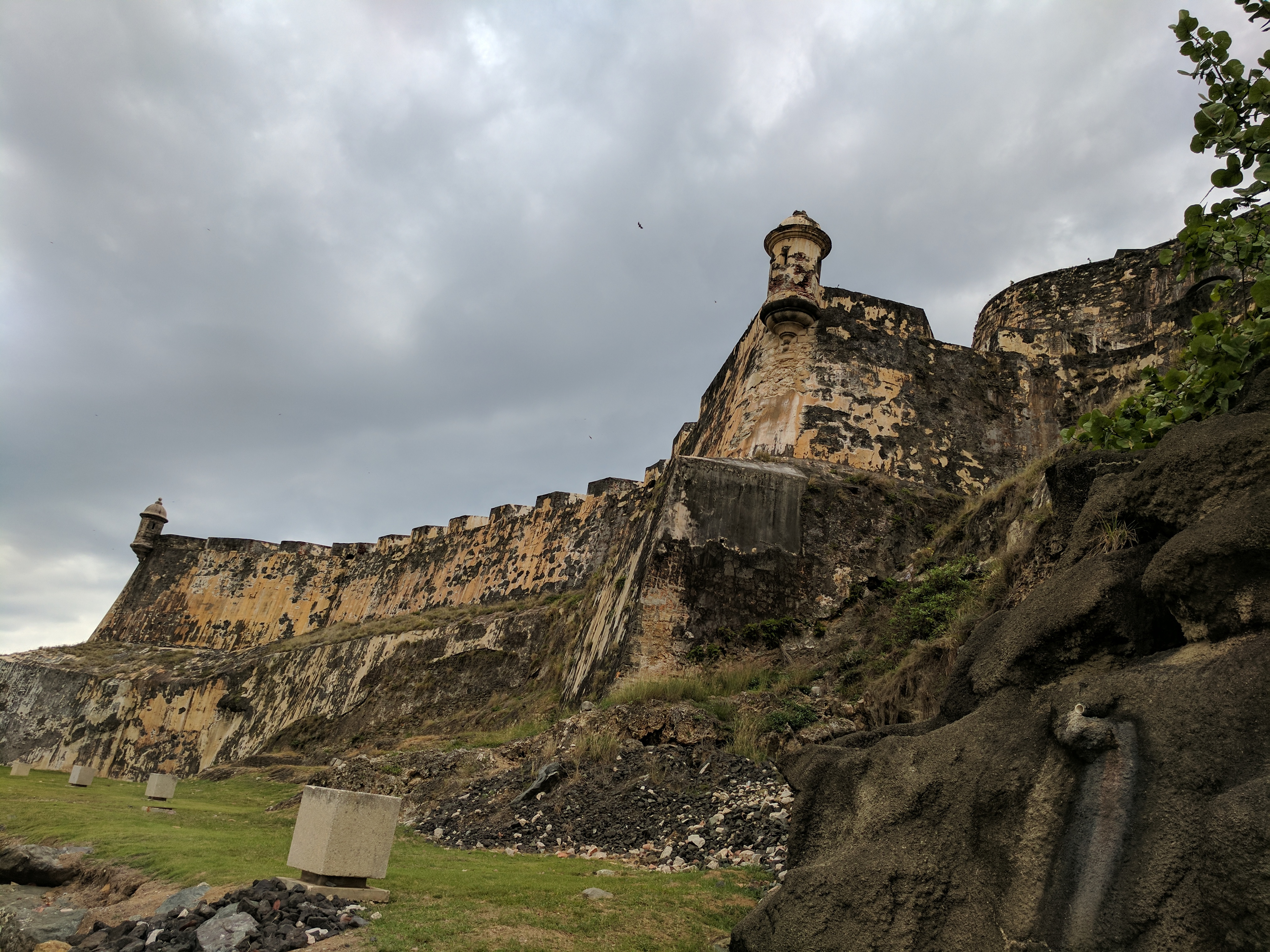
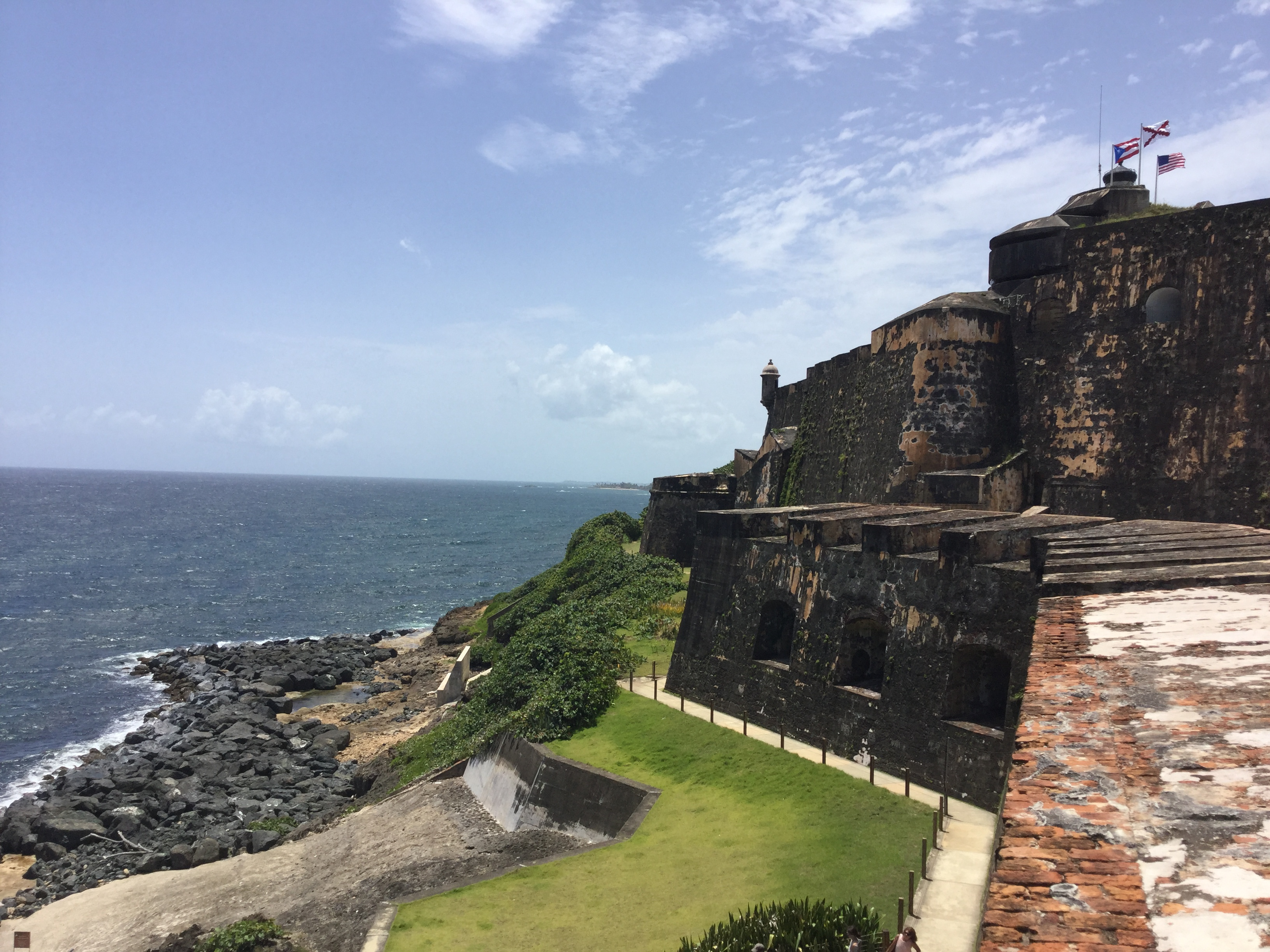
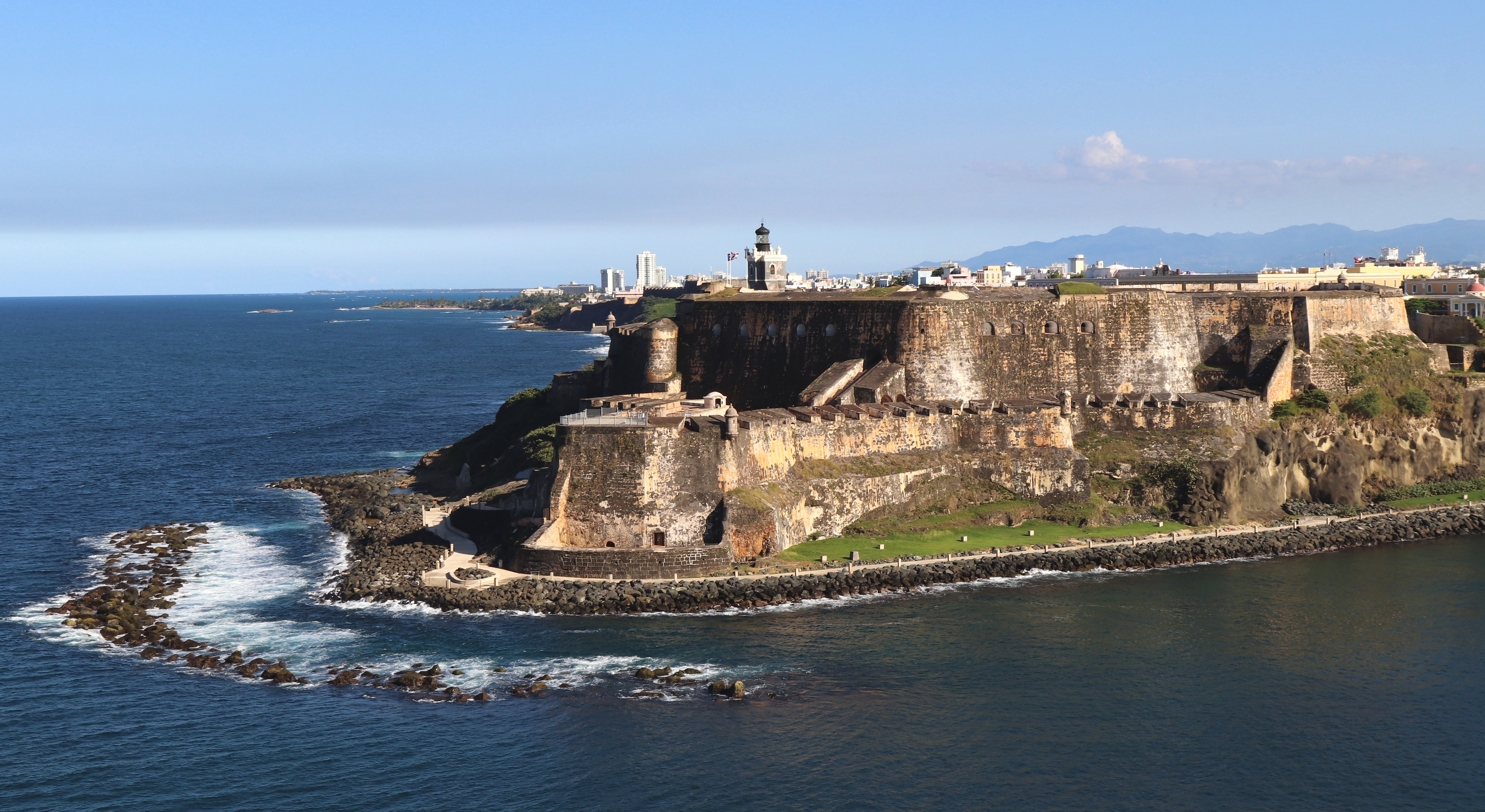
- From top, left to right: Starting point of Paseo del Morro at Puerta de San Juan on the Walls of Old San Juan under La Fortaleza; midpoint of promenade passing under Bastión de San Agustín and Polvorín and Bastión de Santa Elena; and its endpoint at Bastión de San Fernando and Castillo San Felipe del Morro at the entry to San Juan Bay
- Interactive map of the Paseo del Morro area

General information
- Type: Promenade
- Architectural style: Contemporary architecture
- Location: Old San Juan, Puerto Rico
- Coordinates: 18°27′58″N 66°7′16″W
- Opened: 1998
- Owner: Government of Puerto Rico

Paseo del Morro (English: Morro Promenade), is a waterside, riprap-lined, and breakwater-protected pedestrian promenade about 1.5 miles (2.4 km) in length, located in the historic district of Old San Juan in Puerto Rico. Built in 1999 as an extension of an existing 18th-century maintenance walkway on the southwestern section of the wall located on the final stretch of Paseo de la Princesa (Princess Promenade), the promenade is a contemporary construction running adjacent and parallel to the western section of the Walls of Old San Juan, which originally stood directly exposed to the waters of San Juan Bay. It was designated a National Recreational Trail in 2001.

The promenade starts in Catedral, the southwestern sub-barrio in Old San Juan on San Juan Islet, at the ending location of Paseo de la Princesa, Puerta de San Juan (San Juan Gate), formerly known as Puerta de Agua (Water Gate), on the Walls of Old San Juan next to La Fortaleza, the 16th-century executive residence of the Governor of Puerto Rico, passes by the Bastión de San Agustín (San Agustin Bastion), Polvorín de Santa Elena (Santa Elena gunpowder depot), and Bastión de Santa Elena (Santa Elena Bastion) on the Walls of Old San Juan, and ends at the Castillo San Felipe del Morro in Ballajá, the northwestern sub-barrio in Old San Juan on the San Juan Islet, at Punta del Morro (Morro Point), the westernmost position on San Juan Islet overlooking the entrance to San Juan Bay and Isla de Cabras (Goat Island), the small islet immediately across the bay's entrance from El Morro where the 17th-century fort of El Cañuelo was built by the Spanish to further protect Old San Juan and its harbor from invasions by foreign powers and harassment by privateers and pirates during the Age of Discovery and Exploration.
