= San Juan National Historic Site =

U.S. national park site in Puerto Rico

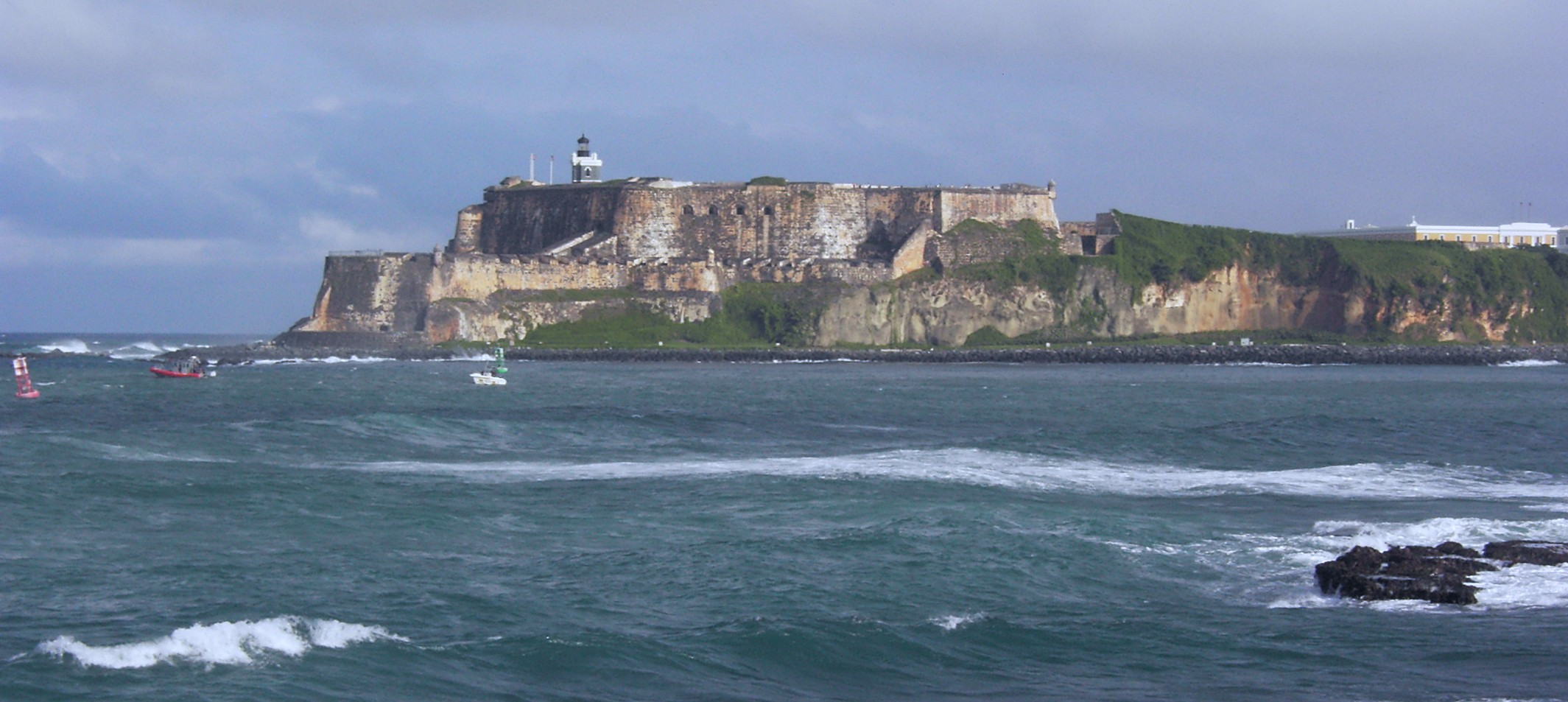

- Location within Puerto Rico
- Location: San Juan, Puerto Rico
- Coordinates: 18°28′3″N 66°6′37″W
- Area: 75.13 acres (30.40 ha); 53.20 acres (21.53 ha) federal
- Established: February 14, 1949
- Visitors: 1,027,264 (in 2022)
- Governing body: National Park Service
- Website: San Juan National Historic Site

UNESCO World Heritage Site
- Criteria: Cultural: (vi)
- Designated: 1983 (7th session)
- Part of: La Fortaleza and San Juan National Historic Site in Puerto Rico
- Reference no.: 266
- Extensions: 2016

U.S. National Register of Historic Places
- Designated: October 15, 1966
- Reference no.: 66000930

San Juan National Historic Site (Spanish: Sitio Histórico Nacional de San Juan) in the Old San Juan section of San Juan, Puerto Rico, is a National Park Service-managed historic site which preserves and interprets the Spanish colonial-era fortification system of the city of San Juan, and features structures such as the San Felipe del Morro and San Cristóbal fortresses. This fortification system is the oldest European construction under United States jurisdiction and one of the oldest in the New World. This national historic site, together with La Fortaleza, have been designated a UNESCO World Heritage Site since 1983.

== History ==
The fortification system of San Juan is closely tied to the history of the city as it defended it from foreign and pirate attacks since its inception during the first half of the 16th century. The city walls are notable for being one of the three remaining of its kind in North America (the other two being Quebec City in Canada and Campeche in Mexico). Three fourths of the walls remain today as a third was heavily damaged during the 1867 earthquake and was later demolished to make way for the construction of a railway and the urban expansion of the city. These fortifications quickly fell into disrepair after the bombardment of San Juan in 1898 during the Spanish–American War and, although modifications and improvements were made during the Second World War, the historic and architectural heritage of the site was at risk by the end of the first half of the 20th century. A federal decree on February 14, 1949, established the historic site, and noted the need to protect the fortifications as monuments as well as preserve their historical and architectural value. The fortification system was further listed on the National Register of Historic Places on October 15, 1966.

On December 6, 1983, the historic site and La Fortaleza were together designated a World Heritage Site under the name La Fortaleza and San Juan National Historic Site in Puerto Rico "because of its outstanding, universal cultural value." It quickly grew to become one of the biggest tourist attractions in Puerto Rico and the Caribbean, drawing more than 1,400,000 visitors in 2016. Together with the Great Smoky Mountains National Park this was the eleventh World Heritage Site to be designated in the United States and as of 2023 it is one of the nineteen designated World Heritage Sites in the Caribbean.

The impacts of climate change on coastal communities and local community perspective are the topic of a 2015 thesis by Leslie Paul Walker Jr.

== Locations and access ==
=== Old San Juan ===
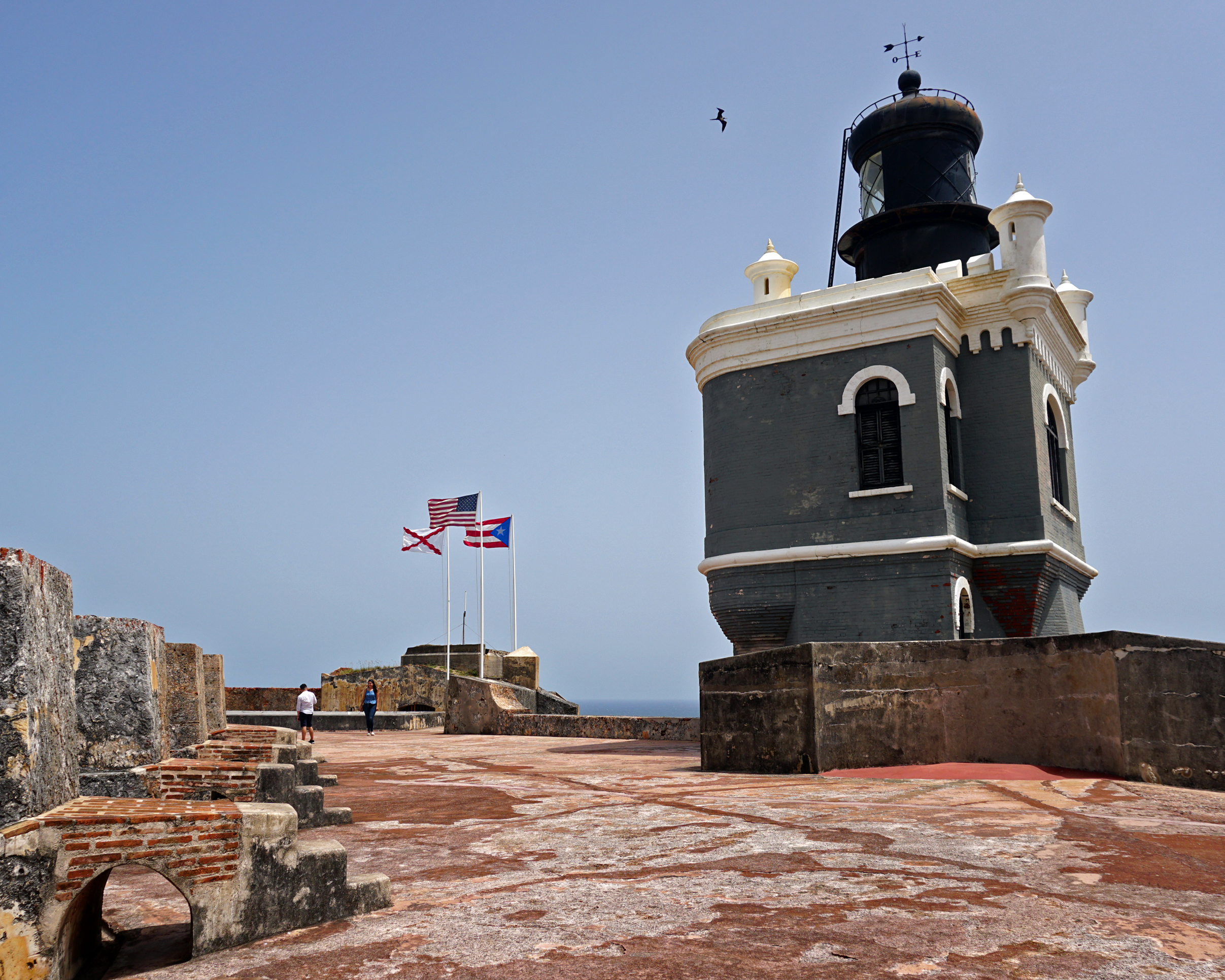
Castillo San Felipe del Morro Lighthouse

Castillo San Felipe del Morro is the most famous and most visited structure of the San Juan National Historic Site. This citadel is located at the northwesternmost tip of the Islet of San Juan built onto a promontory (morro in Spanish) which gives it its nickname of El Morro. Named after King Philip II of Spain, it was built at the site of a former smaller fortress between the 16th and 18th centuries to protect the entrance to the Bay of San Juan and to defend the city from maritime attacks. El Morro Esplanade is a large open area located between El Morro and Ballajá which serves as the main recreational space of the historic site as it offers panoramic views of the bay and is very popular for activities such as picnics, stargazing and kite flying. Additionally, Paseo de la Princesa is a promenade connecting the lower walls of El Morro with the San Juan Gate (Puerta de San Juan), formerly known as the Water Gate (Puerta de Agua), and it offers panoramic views of the San Juan Bay and access to the best preserved section of the city walls and its famous sentry boxes (garitas).

Castillo San Cristóbal, located on the easternmost end of the fortification system of the islet, is not only the largest fortress in the historic site but the largest fortification ever built in the New World. It was built in 1783 on a hill called Cerro de la Horca or the Cerro del Quemadero, later renamed San Cristóbal Hill to commemorate the Spanish victory over the failed 1625 Dutch attempt to conquer the city. In addition to its purpose to defend San Juan from attacks coming by land it also contained a large dungeon, barracks, powder houses and tunnels that connect it to the rest of the city wall system. The National Park Service office in Old San Juan is located in the castle grounds. Although it is not open to the public, the famous Devil's Sentry Box (La Garita del Diablo) is also located in Castillo San Cristóbal.

=== Isla de Cabras ===
El Cañuelo, officially called Fortín San Juan de la Cruz, is located across El Morro in Isla de Cabras, an islet located in the municipality of Toa Baja. It was built between 1630 and 1660 to guard the entrance to the bay together with El Morro. This small fortress is not open to the public but it can be admired from the outside and, although it is administered by the National Park Service as part of the national historic site, its grounds together with the rest of the islet are part of the Isla de Cabras State Park (often referred to as Parque Nacional Isla de Cabras as state parks in Puerto Rico are called parques nacionales in Spanish).

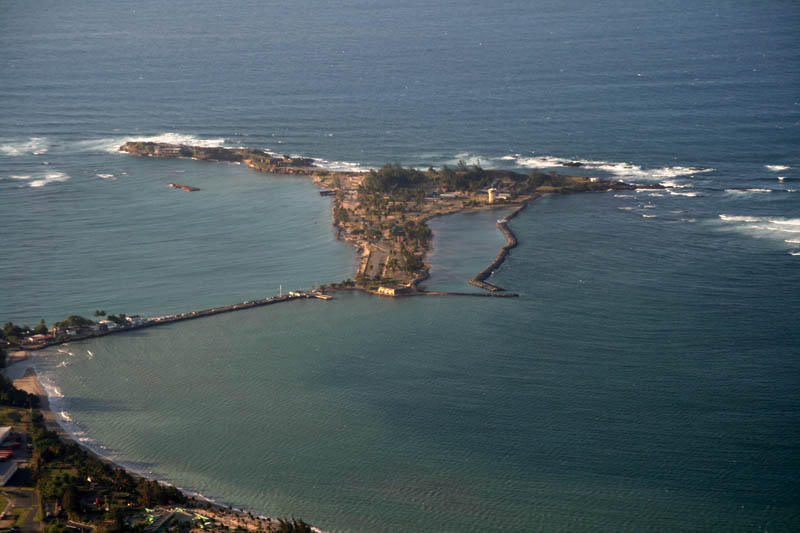
Aerial view of Isla de Cabras with El Cañuelo located at its southernmost point.

=== Visitor centers ===
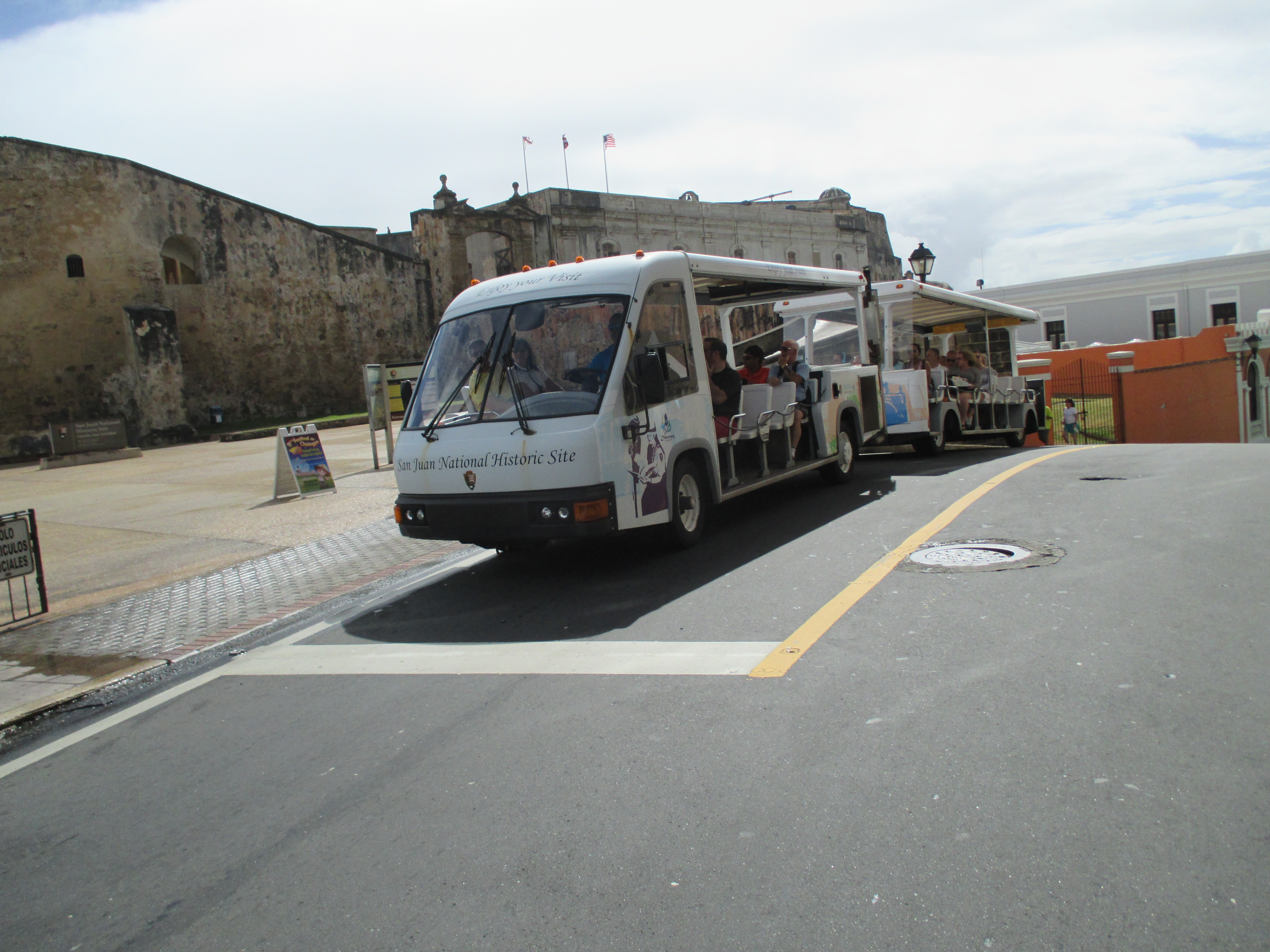
NHS visitor shuttle in Castillo San Cristóbal.

San Juan NHS Visitor Center, the main visitor center to the San Juan National Historic Site, is located at 501 Norzagaray Street next to Castillo San Cristóbal and in front of Plaza Colón at the former site of military headquarters built by the United States during World War II. It temporarily closed during the COVID-19 pandemic, but it is now open daily from 9AM to 5PM. Additional visitor information and interpretation is located inside the El Morro and San Cristóbal fortresses.

=== Affiliated sites ===
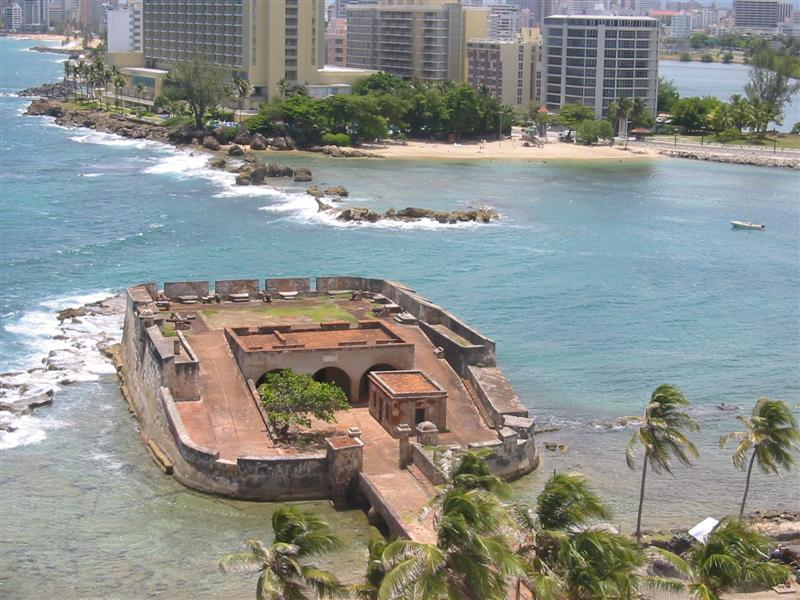
Fortín de San Gerónimo

Fortín de San Gerónimo de Boquerón, commonly known as the San Gerónimo Fortress, is the remaining one of a pair of small fortresses located in the westernmost end of the Isleta de San Juan at the entrance of the Condado Lagoon and a small body of water named El Boquerón. It forms part of a larger fortification system called La Línea Avanzada established in 1609 to defend the connecting point between the islet and the main island of Puerto Rico from both terrestrial and maritime attacks. Although it is currently administered by the Government of Puerto Rico, a bill submitted by Resident Commissioner of Puerto Rico Jenniffer González in May 2023 designated it as an affiliated area of the National Park System, which will authorize the National Park Service to enter into cooperative agreements with the Institute of Puerto Rican Culture to provide technical and financial assistance for the fort's preservation, without placing the site under federal ownership.

=== Related sites ===
==== La Fortaleza ====
La Fortaleza, now known as Palacio de Santa Catalina, is the only fortification that is not administered by the National Park Service as it serves today as the official residence to the Governor of Puerto Rico (it is the oldest executive mansion in continuous use in the Western Hemisphere). It was listed in the National Register of Historic Places and designated a National Historic Landmark in 1960 and, along with the San Juan National Historic Site, it has been a World Heritage Site since 1983. The palace is open to the public through 30-minute guided walking tours which are offered Monday through Friday between 8:15 am and 3:30 pm.

==== Old San Juan ====
The historic district of Old San Juan (Viejo San Juan, officially Zona Histórica de San Juan), listed in the National Register of Historic Places since October 10, 1972, and designated a National Historic Landmark District since 2013, represents the oldest continuously inhabited settlement in Puerto Rico and the oldest historic colonial district under the United States jurisdiction. This historic district is often confused with or incorrectly referred to as the San Juan National Historic Site and it contains some of the oldest buildings under U.S. jurisdiction such as La Casa Blanca, the Church of San José and the San Juan Cathedral, and landmarks such as Capilla del Cristo, the Ballajá Barracks, the San Juan City Hall and a large number of historic squares, cobblestone streets and alleyways, museums, cafes and restaurants which cater to residents, locals and tourists alike. The Institute of Puerto Rican Culture owns and administers several museums and cultural institutions in Old San Juan such as the 19th Century Puerto Rican Family House Museum (Casa de la Familia Puertorriqueña del Siglo XIX), while the Conservation Trust of Puerto Rico nonprofit unit of Para La Naturaleza, administers the Ramón Power y Giralt House; both of these institutions also serve as interpretative centers for visitors of Old San Juan.

Old San Juan is not part of the La Fortaleza and San Juan National Historic Site in Puerto Rico World Heritage Site, however, there have been multiple proposals for either expanding the site to include this historic district or, after its 2013 National Historic Landmark designation, for it to be listed as a new World Heritage Site by itself.

== Gallery ==
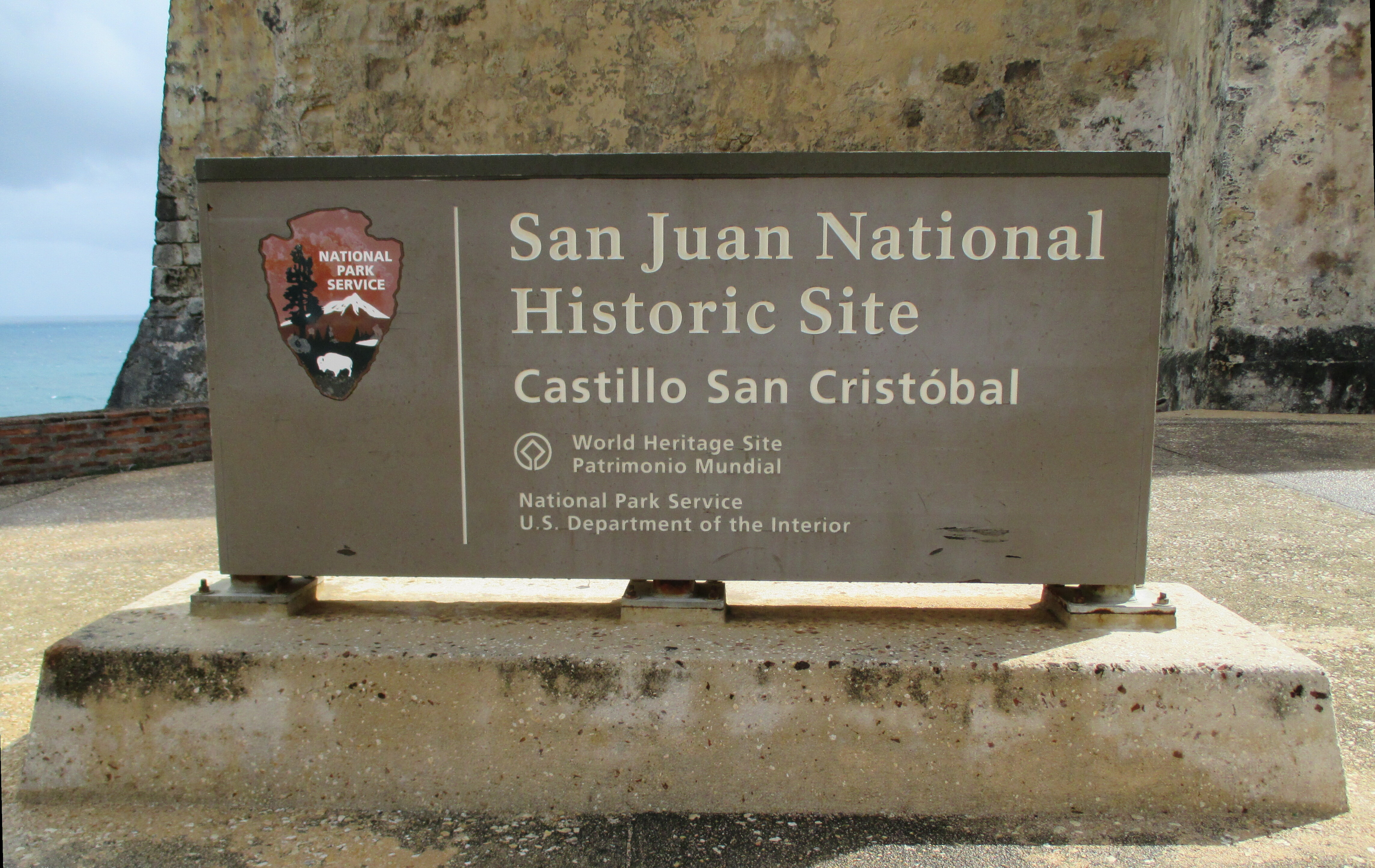
San Juan National Historic Site sign (Castillo San Cristóbal)

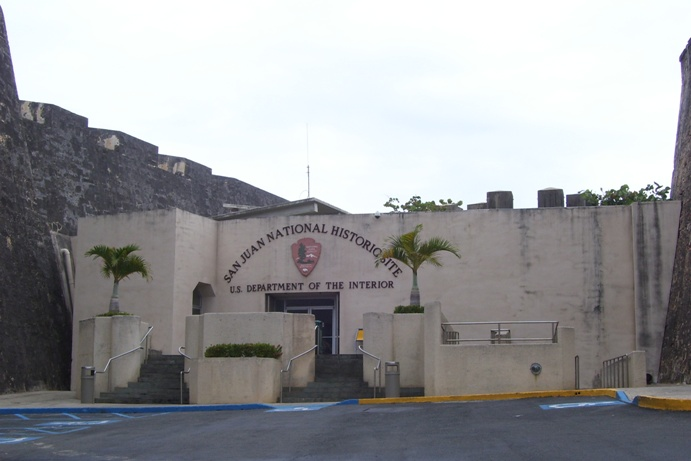
Main offices of the San Juan National Historic Site

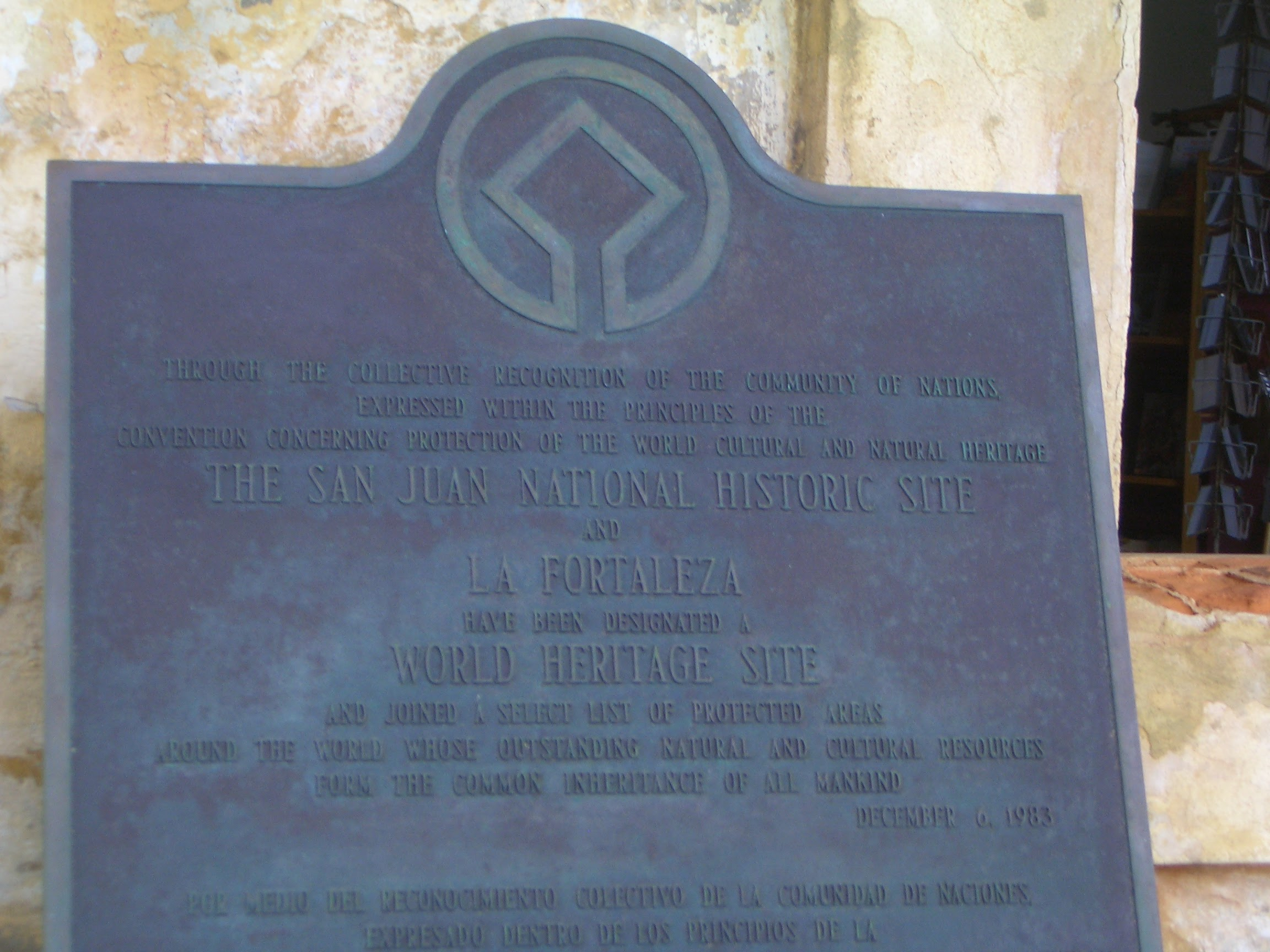

== See also ==
- La Fortaleza
- Old San Juan
