= La Fortaleza and San Juan National Historic Site in Puerto Rico =

World heritage site in Puerto Rico

UNESCO World Heritage Site
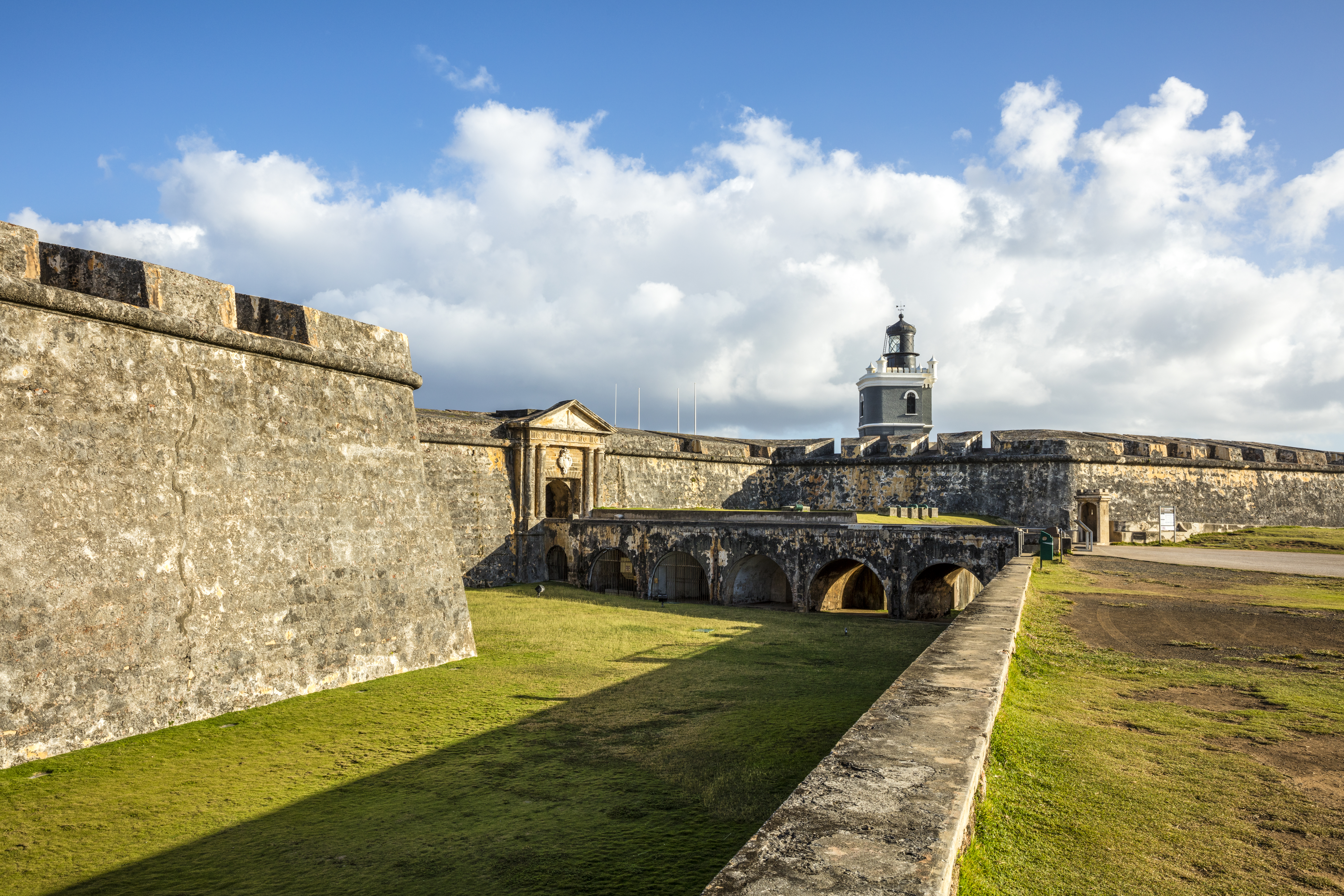
- Castillo de San Felipe del Morro

- Location within Puerto Rico
- Location: San Juan, Puerto Rico
- Criteria: Cultural: (vi)
- Reference: 266
- Inscription: 1983 (7th Session)
- Area: 33.39 ha (82.5 acres)
- Coordinates: 18.4711°N 66.1242°W

La Fortaleza and San Juan National Historic Site in Puerto Rico is a UNESCO World Heritage Site located in Puerto Rico, an unincorporated territory of the United States in the Caribbean. The world heritage site consists of several historic defensive structures built by the Spanish Empire between the 16th and 20th centuries to defend the strategically located colonial city of San Juan and its bay from foreign attacks. These fortifications are among the oldest European-built defensive systems and largest of its kind in the Western Hemisphere. In addition to its historic importance the site is notable for its architectural significance as one of the most prominent military adaptations of Renaissance and Baroque architecture in the Americas.

== Nomination ==
La Fortaleza and San Juan National Historic Site in Puerto Rico was proclaimed a UNESCO World Heritage Site during the 7th annual session of the World Heritage Committee that took place in the city of Florence, Italy on December of 1983. It was Puerto Rico's first inscription and one of the two world heritage sites under United States jurisdiction proclaimed during that session along with the Great Smoky Mountains National Park. It was also the first and, as of 2023, one of two world heritage sites located in an unincorporated territory of the United States along with Papahānaumokuākea, shared between Hawaii and Midway Atoll (the latter part of the United States Minor Outlying Islands). La Fortaleza and San Juan National Historic Site was inscribed under the Cultural criterion (vi) for its historical and architectural significance.

Before becoming a world heritage site, La Fortaleza had been granted the federal designation of National Historic Landmark in 1960. Historic sites in the United States that are neither part of nor owned by the National Park Service (NPS) are often required to be given this special designation by the federal government before they can be officially nominated into the UNESCO World Heritage Tentative List.

== World Heritage listing ==
The site comprises a series of Spanish-built colonial fortifications across two contributing properties:

- La Fortaleza (Spanish for 'the fortress'), the first defensive fortification to be built in San Juan which today functions as the official executive residence to the Governor of Puerto Rico. Built between 1533 and 1540, it is now the oldest executive residence in the Western Hemisphere.
- San Juan National Historic Site (Spanish: Sitio histórico nacional de San Juan) is a national historic site (NHS) managed by the National Park Service (NPS) that comprises the following military structures built between the 16th and 19th centuries:
  - Castillo de San Felipe del Morro located at the northwesternmost corner of Isleta de San Juan, it was built to oversee and provide protection to the entrance to the Bay of San Juan.
  - Castillo de San Cristóbal located at the northeast corner of the defensive wall system that encircles Old San Juan, it was built to provide protection against land and maritime attacks.
  - El Cañuelo located in Isla de Cabras in the modern-day municipality of Toa Baja across from El Morro, it was built to control the maritime access into the Bay of San Juan.
  - San Juan City Walls, built to protect the colonial city of San Juan (today the designated historic district of Old San Juan), a strategic location and maritime stopover in the Caribbean basin between the European Atlantic Ocean and the Spanish Main.

== Extension and possible related nominations ==
This world heritage site was extended in 2016 to formally include Las Palmas Bastion (Spanish: Bastión de las Palmas), a small bastion located along the southern portion of the city wall that is officially part of the NPS-managed San Juan National Historic Site but today occupied by a small municipal park between the El Mundo building and the former chamber of commerce.

Media reports often conflate this narrowly tailored UNESCO listing with the much broader area covered by the Old San Juan Historic District. However, there has been interest by both the public and the government to expand the World Heritage Site to cover the entire district, particularly since 2013. That year, Old San Juan became a National Historic Landmark District, therefore meeting the designation required before it can be nominated to the World Heritage Tentative List.

== See also ==
- List of World Heritage sites in the United States
- List of World Heritage sites in North America
- List of World Heritage sites in the Caribbean
