= Isla de Cabras =

Island peninsula in Toa Baja, Puerto Rico

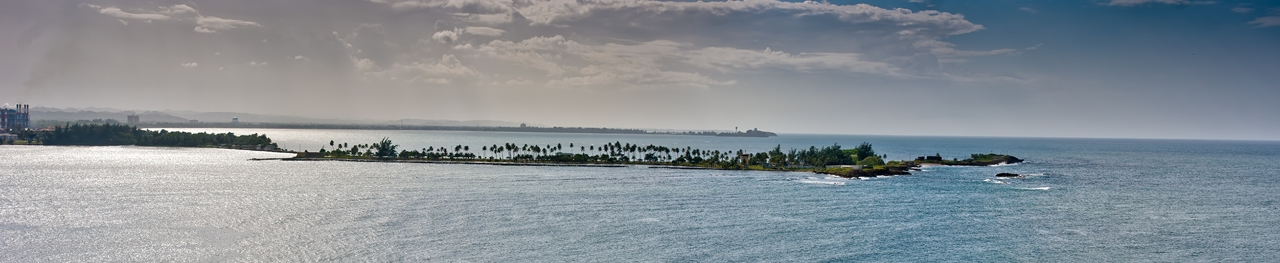
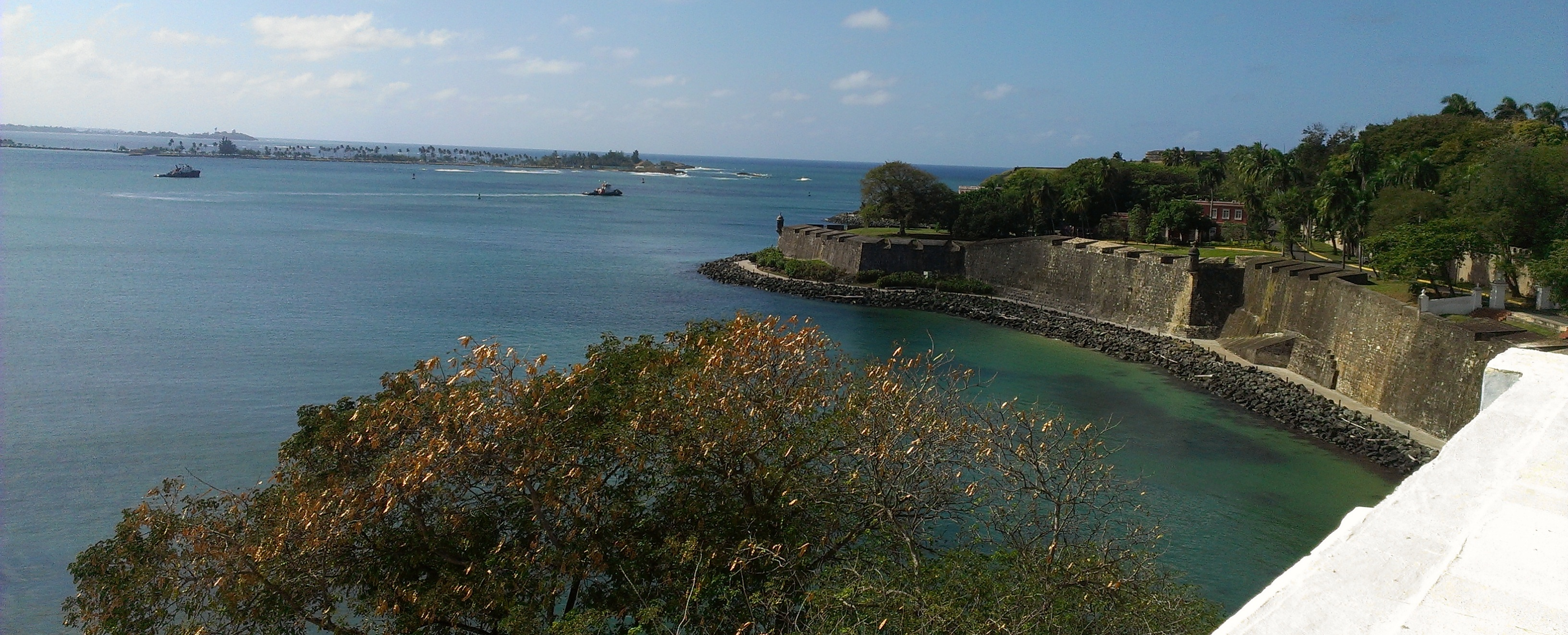
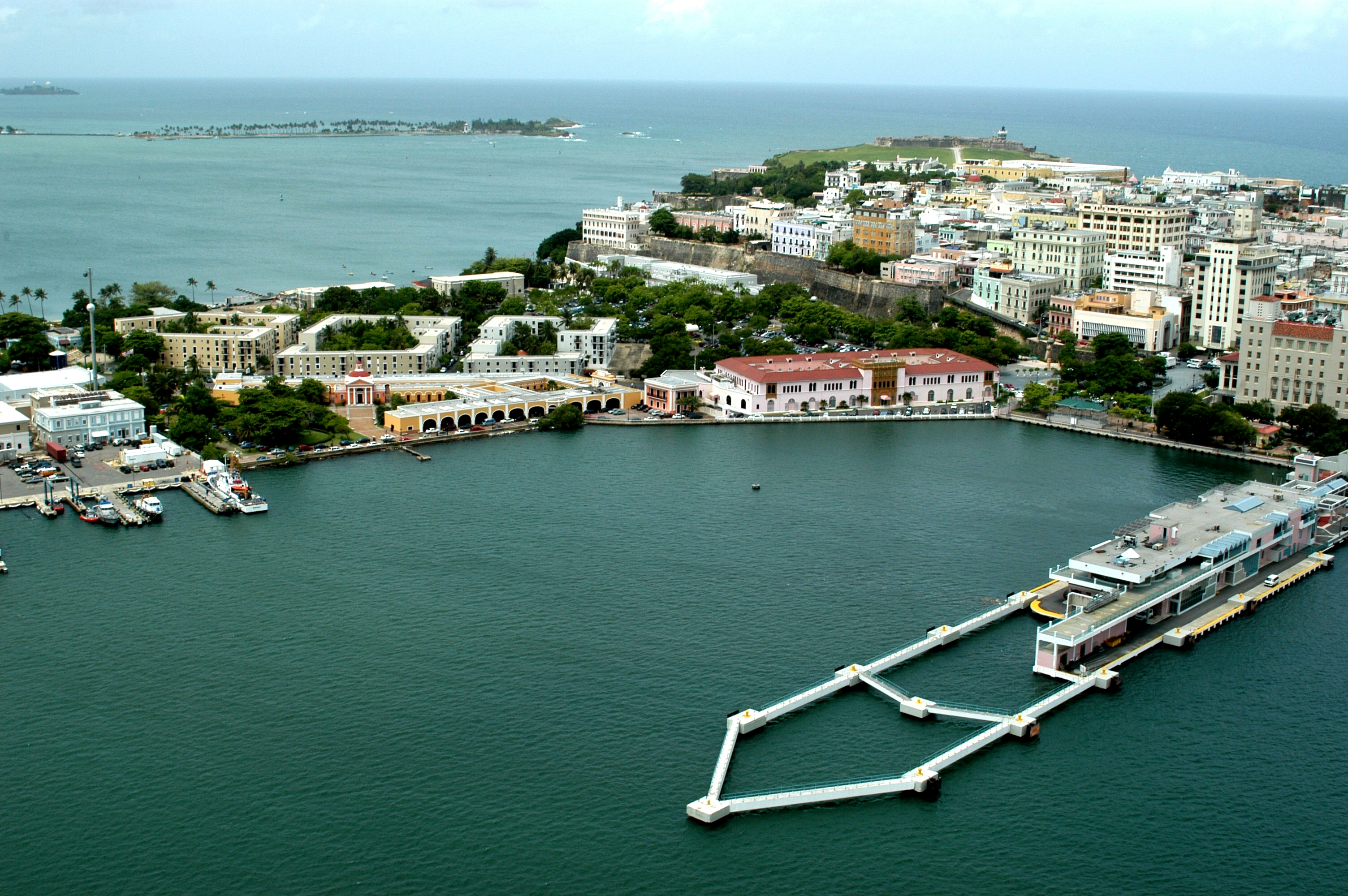
- Isla de Cabras (foreground) from El Morro fortress in the Old San Juan historic quarter in San Juan Islet Isla de Cabras (background) from La Fortaleza palace in Old San Juan Isla de Cabras (background) and western Old San Juan from San Juan Bay

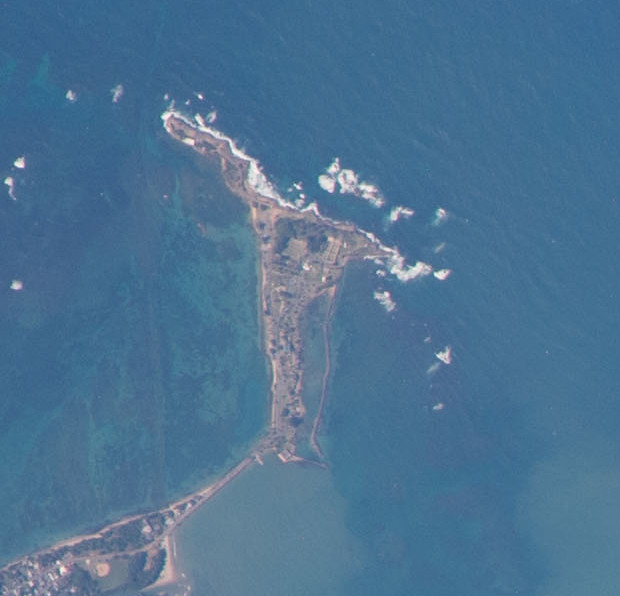
- Satellite view of Isla de Cabras at the mouth of San Juan Bay in northeastern Puerto Rico, 2016
- Interactive map

Geography
- Location: San Juan Bay in San Juan, Puerto Rico
- Coordinates: 18°28′20.51″N 66°8′12.3″W

Administration
- United States; Puerto Rico
- Commonwealth: Puerto Rico
- Municipality: Toa Baja
- Barrio: Palo Seco

Isla de Cabras (Spanish for "goat island") is a small islet in the middle of the mouth of San Juan Bay in northeastern Puerto Rico. Part of the Palo Seco barrio in the Toa Baja municipality, the islet is located at the entrance to the Bay, across from the Old San Juan historic quarter in San Juan Islet in San Juan, the capital municipality of the archipelago and island. Home to Isla de Cabras National Park, a recreational area opened in 1957, it contains El Cañuelo fort, which alongside El Morro fortress in San Juan Islet, protected the Bay, the harbor of Old San Juan, from invasion by competing world powers during the Age of Sail. The ruins of a 19th-century leprosy colony and a WWII fort are located in the islet, which also houses a police firing range since 1950. Bacardi’s Cathedral of Rum in the adjacent Cataño municipality is immediately south of the islet.

Surrounded by reefs and shoals, Isla de Cabras originally consisted of the rocky headland in the north of the islet. However, it was naturally connected to El Cañuelo fort by a shoal historically identified as Bajo del Cañuelo ("Cañuelo Shoal"). In 1943, this narrow, submerged sandbank was landfilled, elevating the partially underwater fort above sea level and creating a road linking the islet and fort with the main island of Puerto Rico at Punta Palo Seco ("dry weed point") in the Toa Baja municipality.

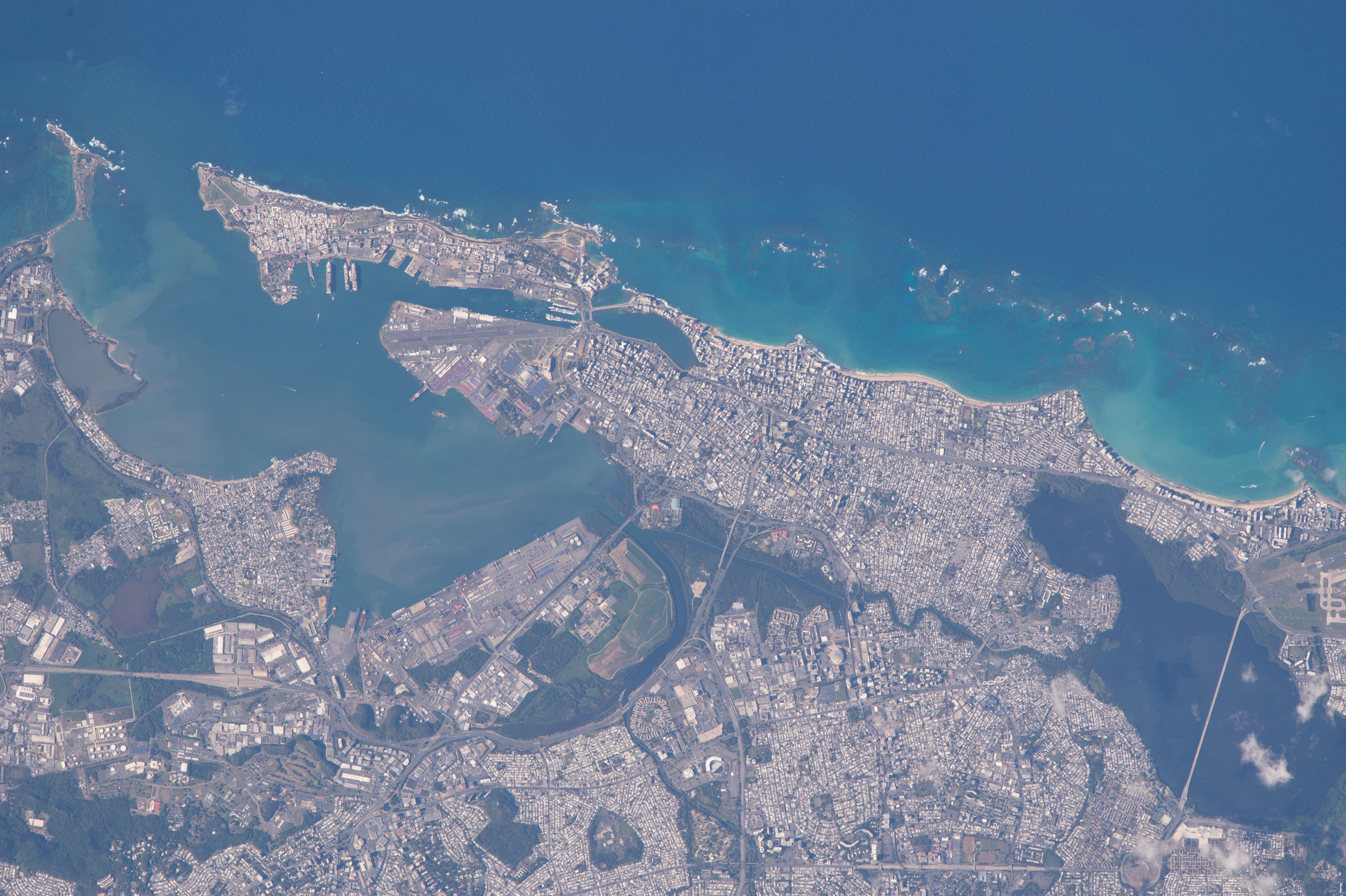
Satellite view from entrance to San Juan Bay (upper left) between Isla de Cabras in the Toa Baja municipality and Old San Juan historic quarter in San Juan Islet in the San Juan capital municipality to Isla Verde resort area (upper right) in the Carolina municipality, 2016

== History ==
=== Spanish Fortification ===
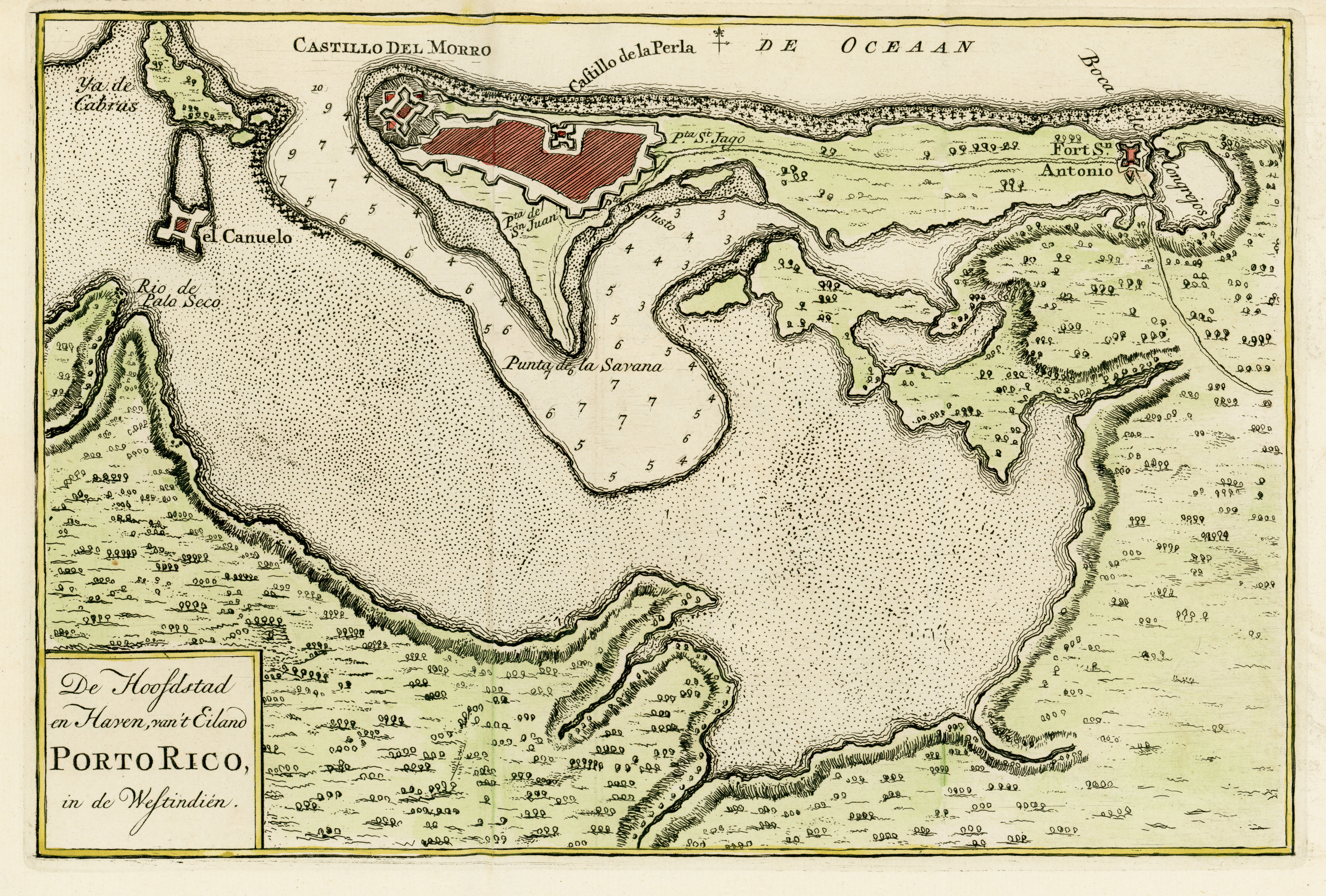
Map of San Juan Bay with Isla de Cabras and El Cañuelo fort located in the middle of the bay’s mouth, Isaak Tirion in 1769

Due to its strategic location at the entrance of San Juan Bay, Isla de Cabras provided a strategic point for an effective crossfire with Fort San Felipe del Morro to prevent incoming ships from entering. It also provided defenses for the entrance of the Bayamón River on the other side of the islet.

=== Leper Colony ===
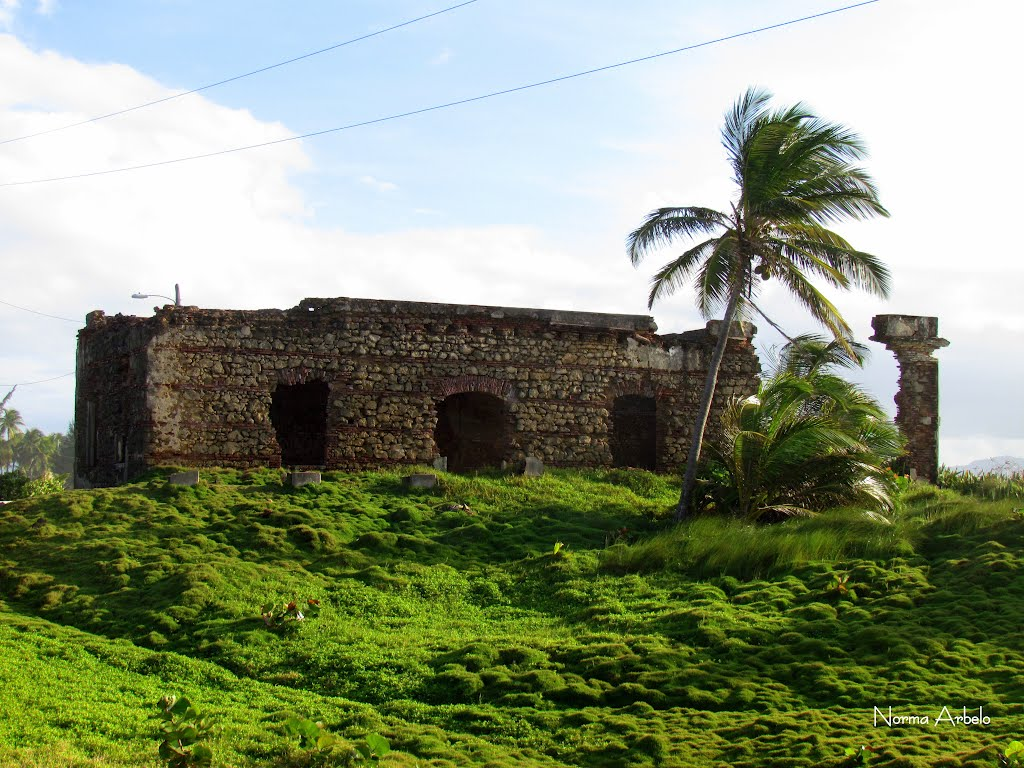
Ruins of the building housing the "lepers", in 2012

At the end of the 19th century, a leper colony was established on the island. On December 17, 1876, the governor of Puerto Rico, Segundo de la Portilla, set the first stone of the official building to house lepers, which was completed in 1883. However, it is believed that the colony was established prior to construction of the building.

Upon the occupation of Puerto Rico by American troops in 1898, management of the building was handed over to the government of the island. According to the 1910 US Census, there were 35 people living on the island at that time.

In 1926, a leper asylum was built on the main island (Trujillo Alto) next to a church, and the residents of the colony were moved there. However, the original building still stands on Isla de Cabras.

=== American Fortification ===
In the 1940s, the United States built Fort Amezquita (named for Juan de Amézqueta), a few hundred feet from El Cañuelo. The fort was initially called the "Cabras Island Military Reservation". During World War II this fort served as a "concrete gun battery" for the US Army Coast Artillery Corps. In November 1940 the US Army transferred the barrels of three 12-inch coastal guns from Fort Delaware, Delaware; two of these guns were mounted in the fort as Battery Reed (named for Brigadier General Henry A. Reed) with the third as a spare. They were on long-range M1917 barbette carriages and protected by concrete casemates.

=== Shooting Range & Recreational Park ===
In recent years, the grounds that belonged to Fort Amezquita were converted into a shooting range and training area by the P.R.P.D. Ownership of the remaining acres of land were under legal dispute, until they were finally transferred to the Department of Sports and Recreation and opened to the public as the Isla de Cabras Recreational Park, which is equipped with several gazebos and includes a beach for swimming and fishing.

== Gallery ==
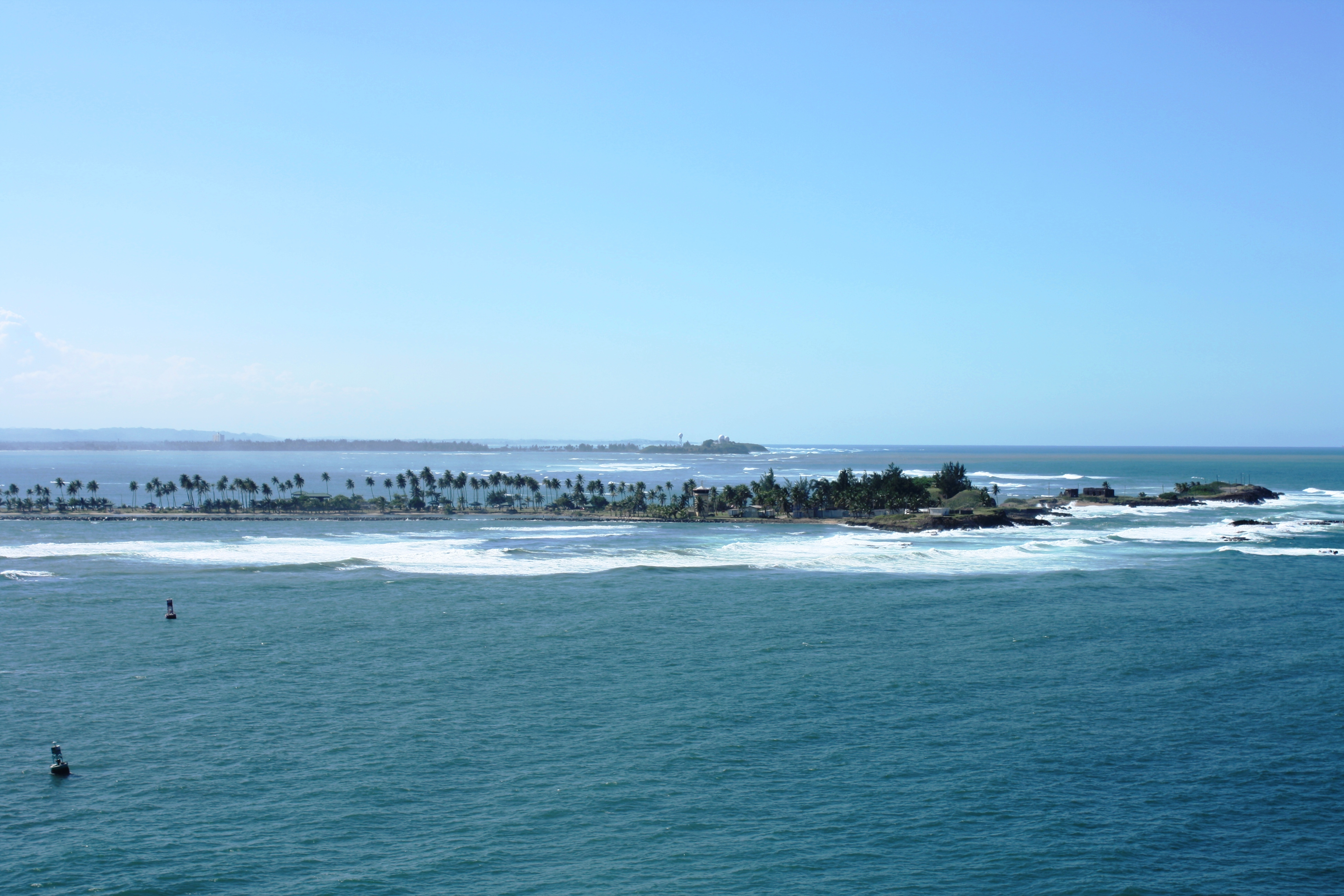
Isla de Cabras from El Morro fortress in Old San Juan historic quarter

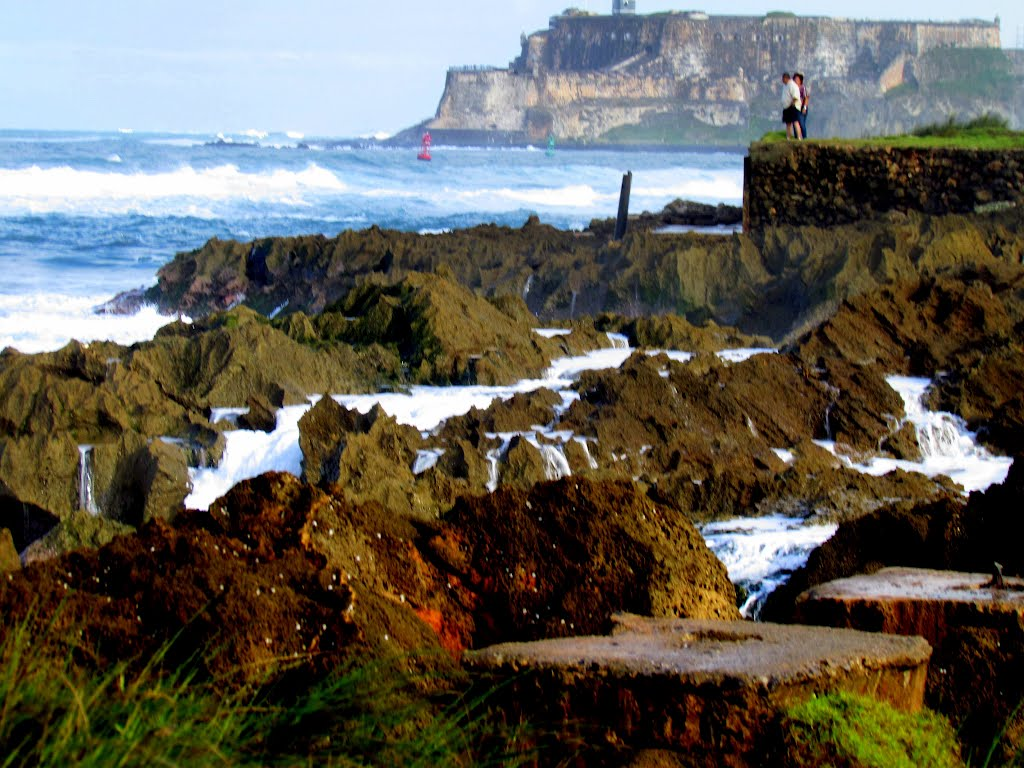
El Morro fortress from Isla de Cabras

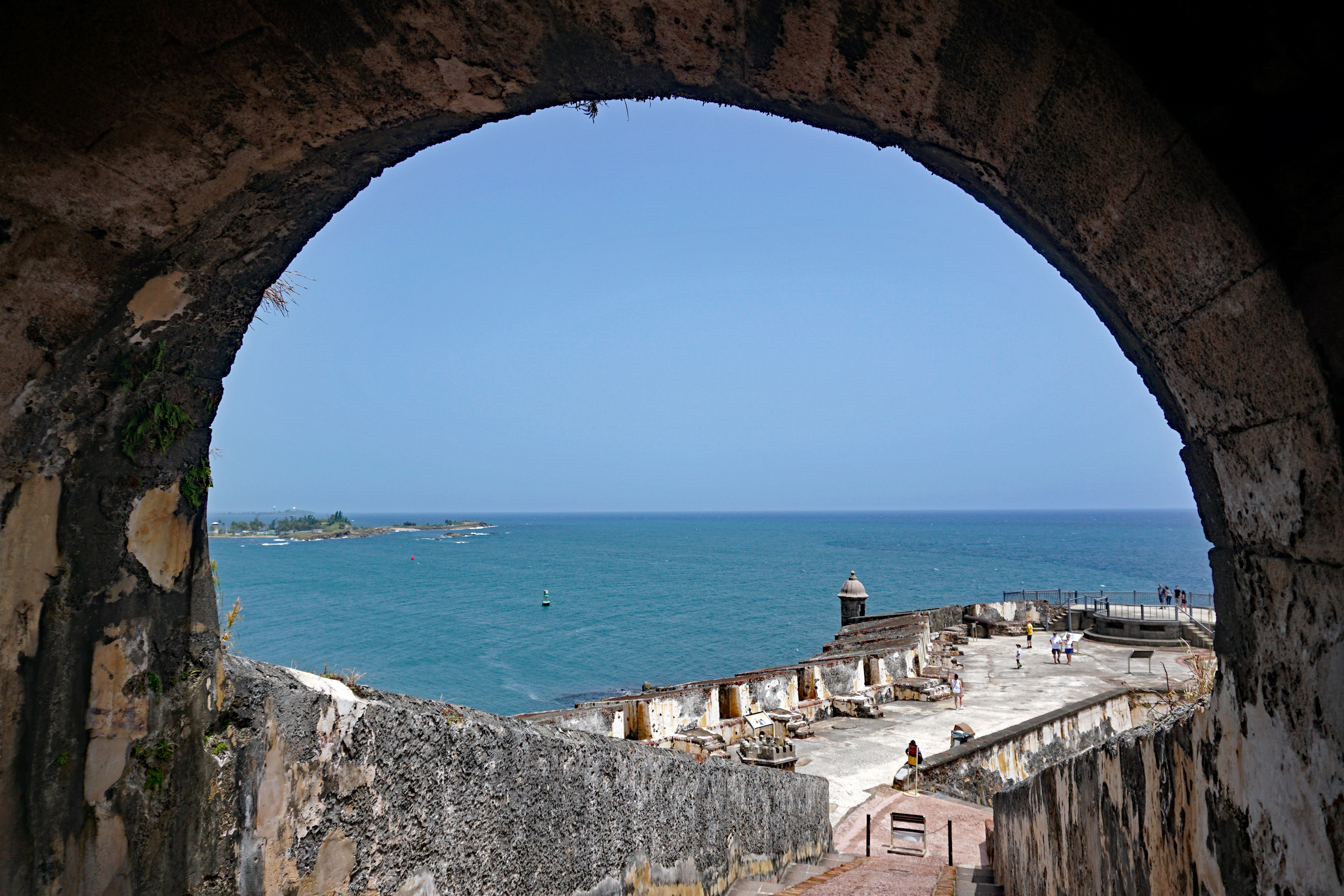
Northern part of Isla de Cabras and mouth of San Juan Bay from El Morro fortress

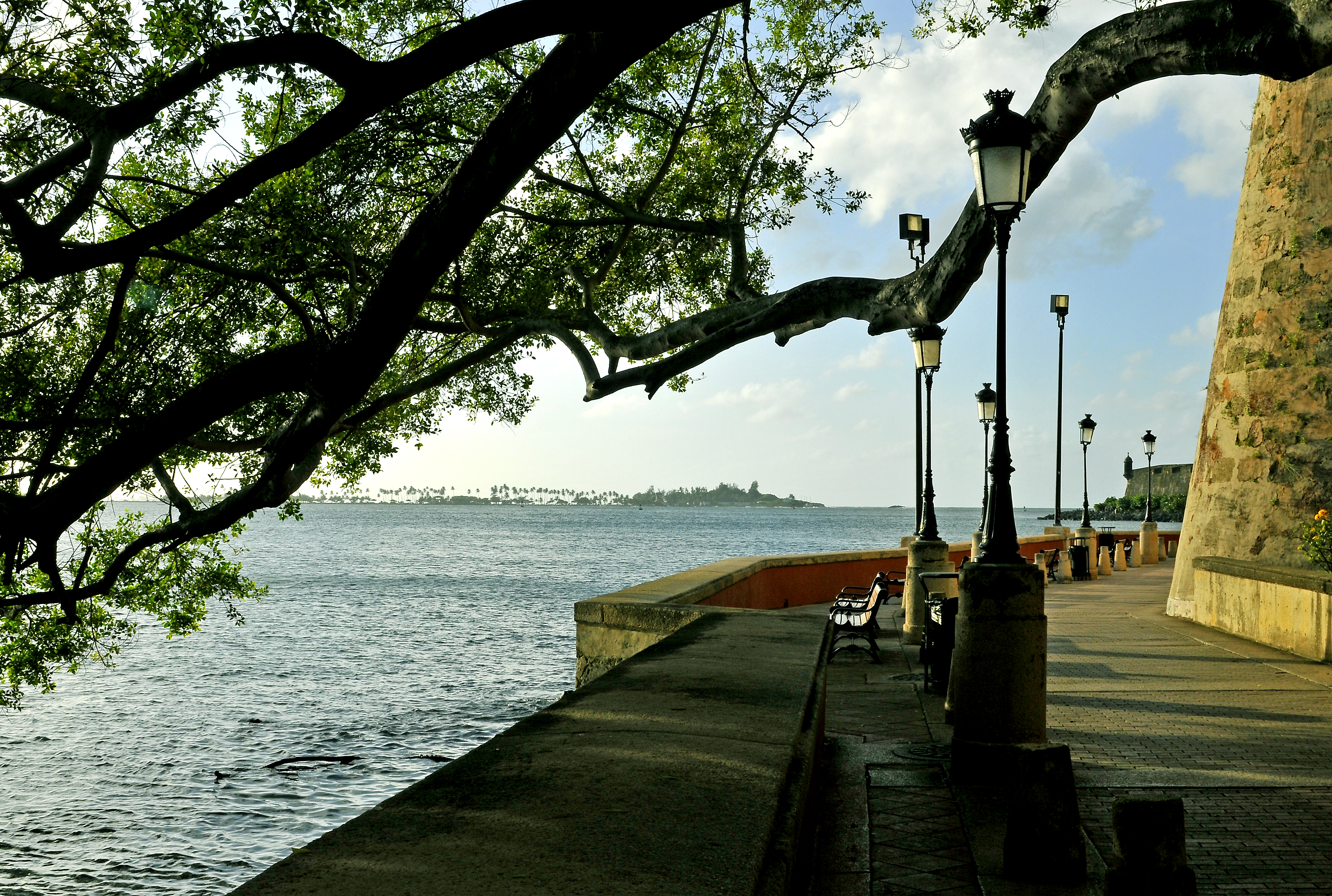
Isla de Cabras from Paseo de la Princesa promenade

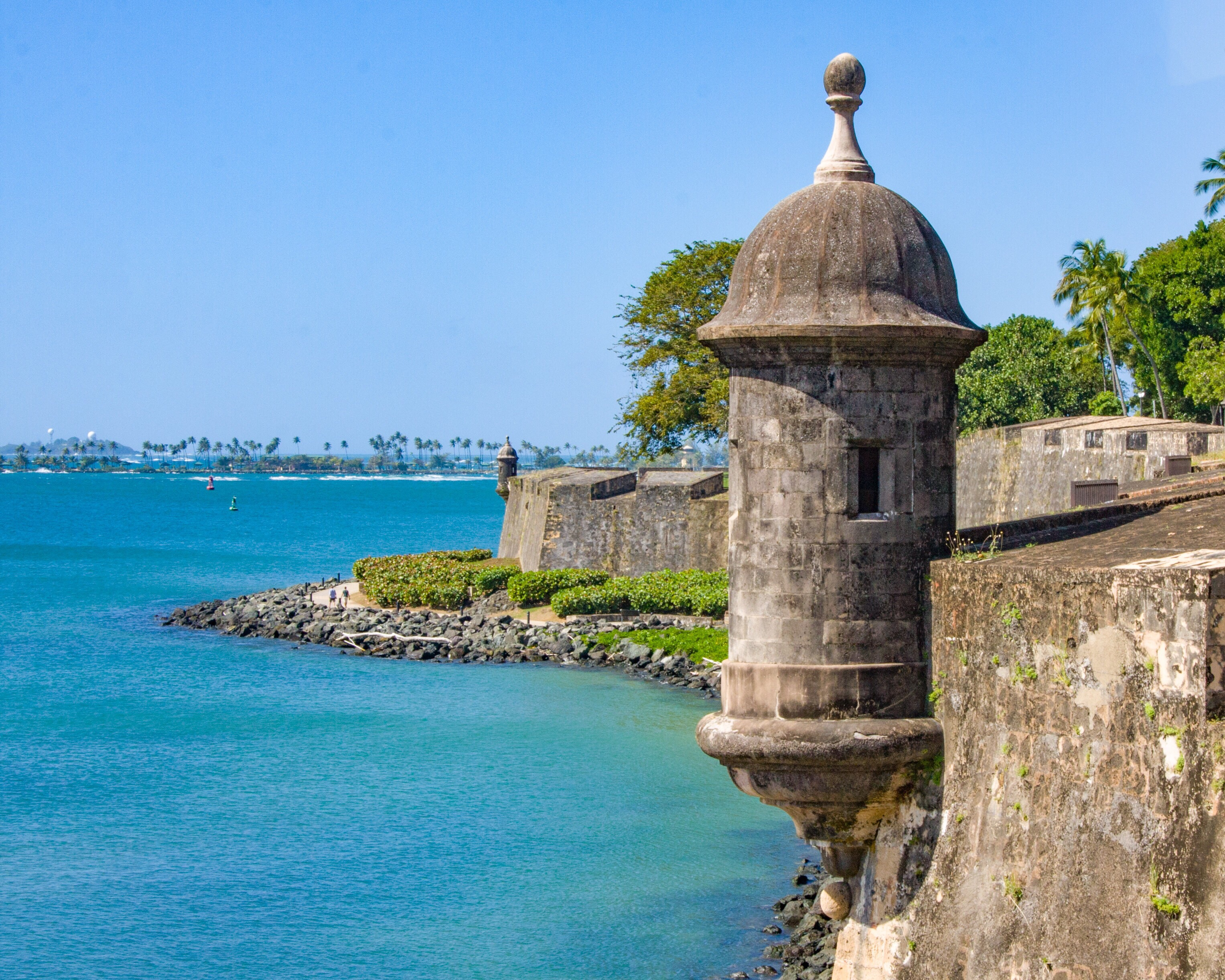
Isla de Cabras from the Walls of Old San Juan

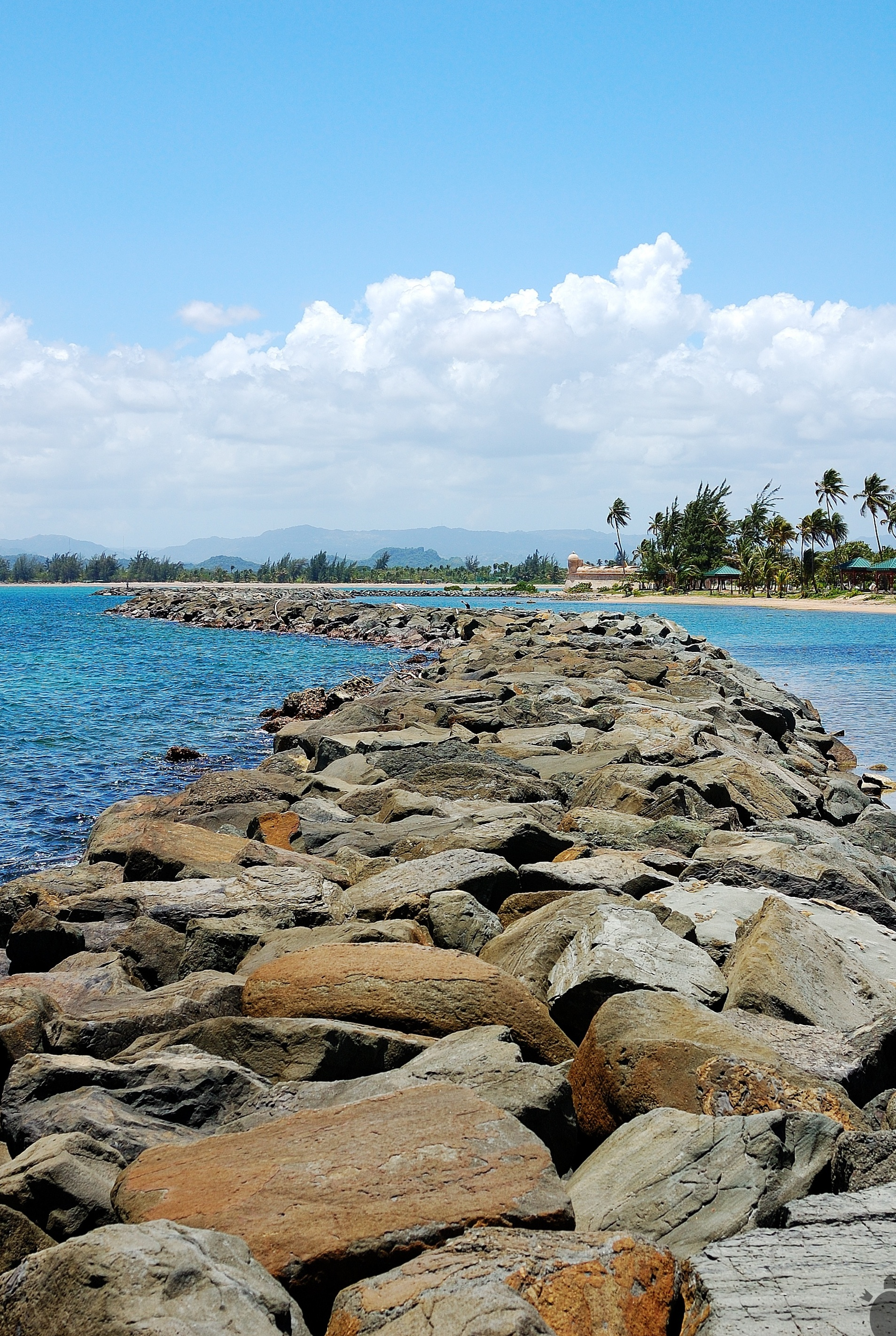
Breakwater protecting Isla de Cabras

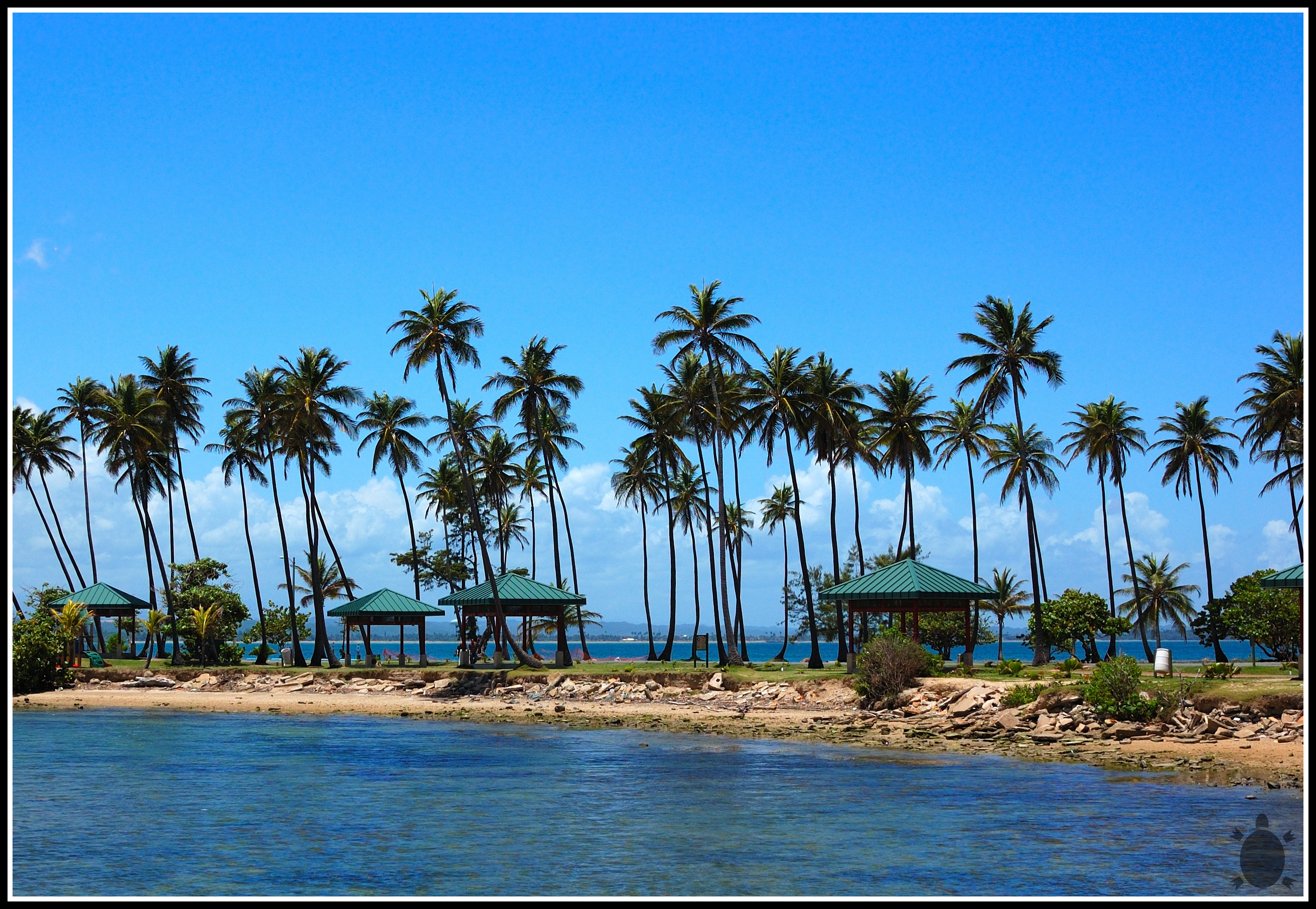
Recreational park at Isla de Cabras

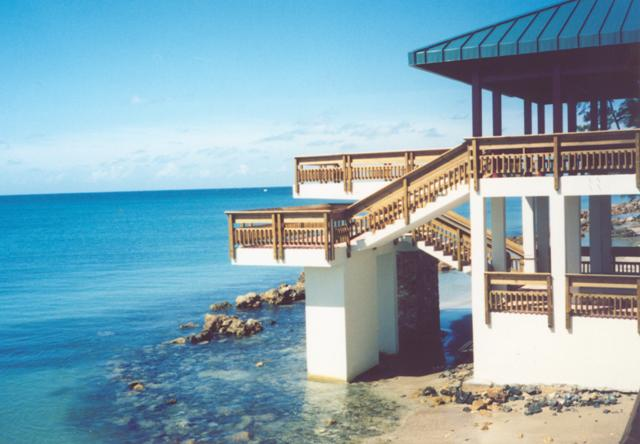
One of the main gazebos at recreational park (2005)

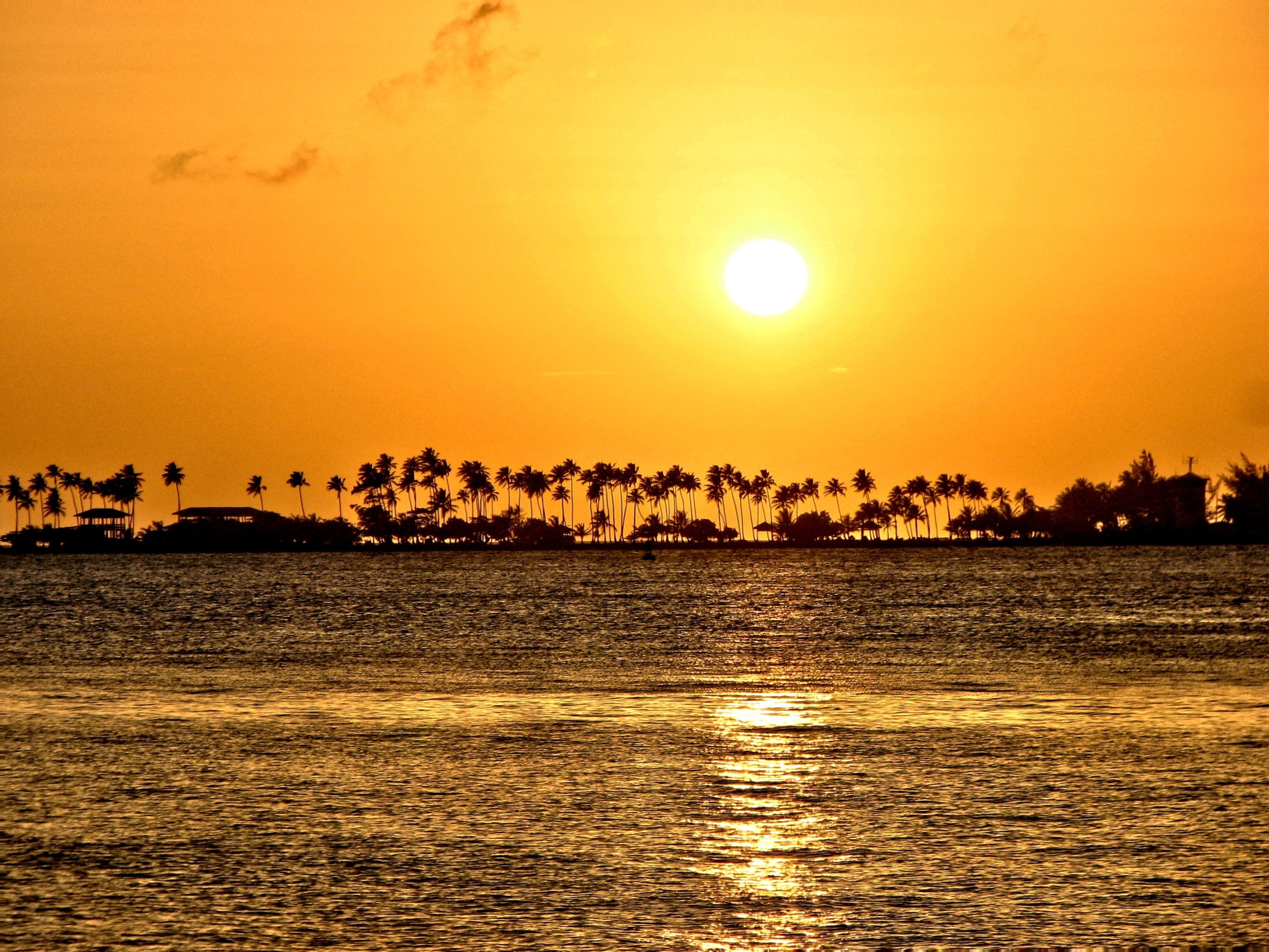
Isla de Cabras from the El Morro fortress

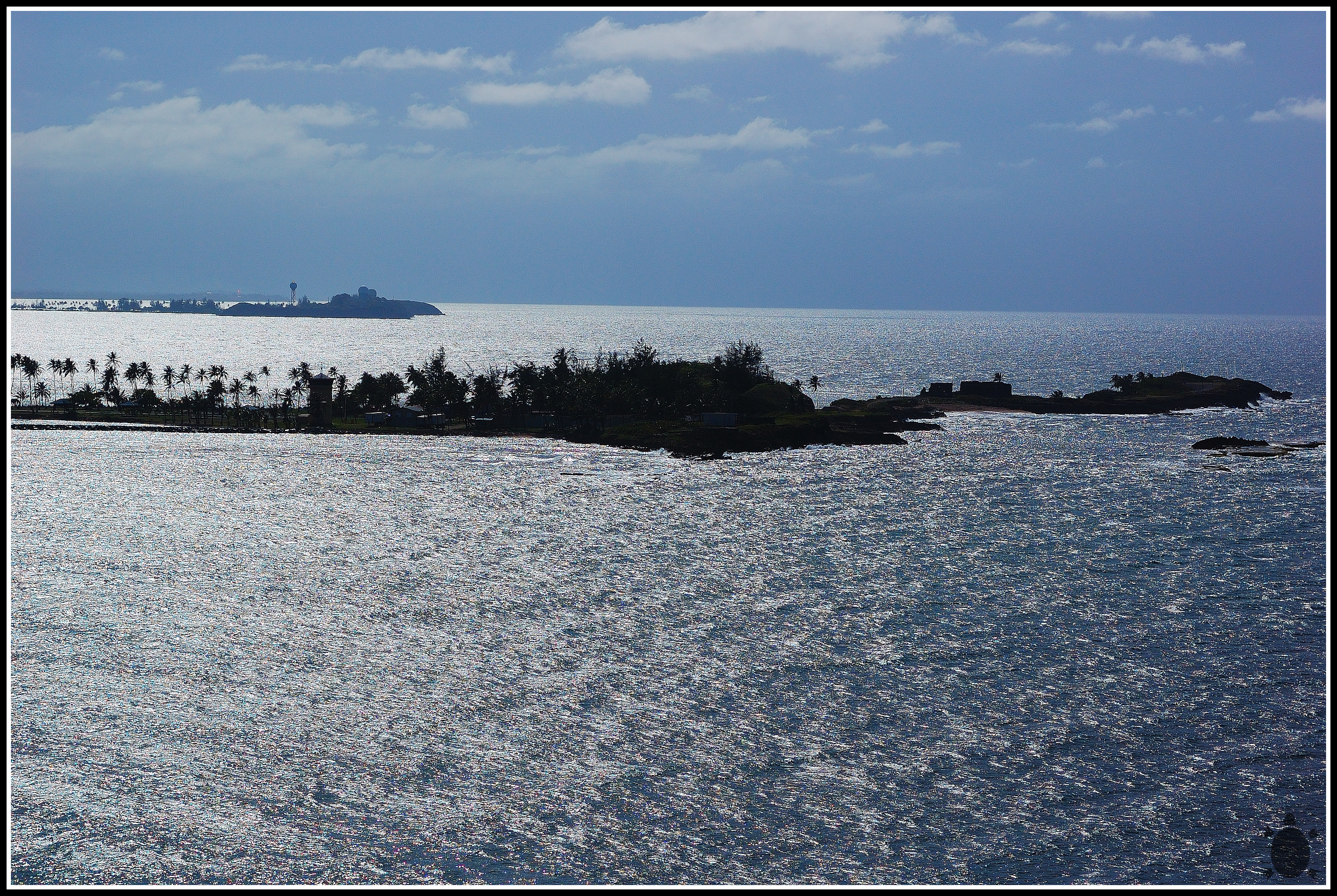
Isla de Cabras from the El Morro fortress

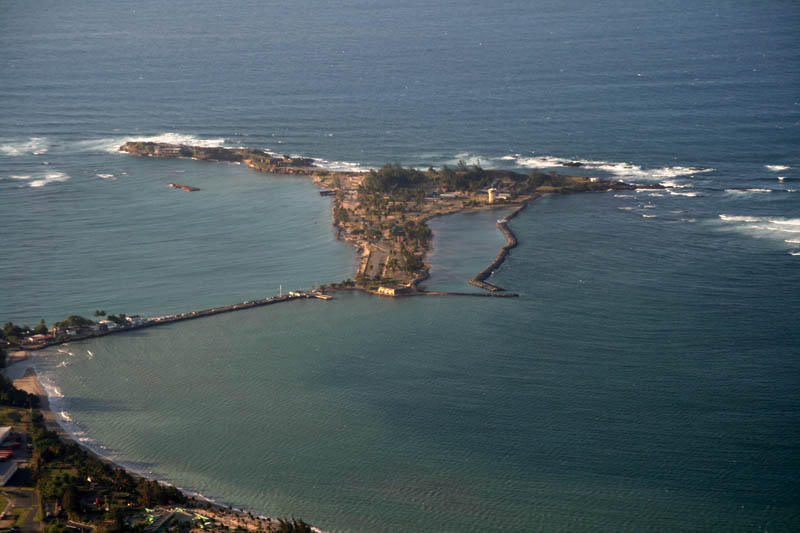

== See also ==
- El Cañuelo
