= Superintendent of Lighthouses' Dwelling =

- U.S. National Register of Historic Places
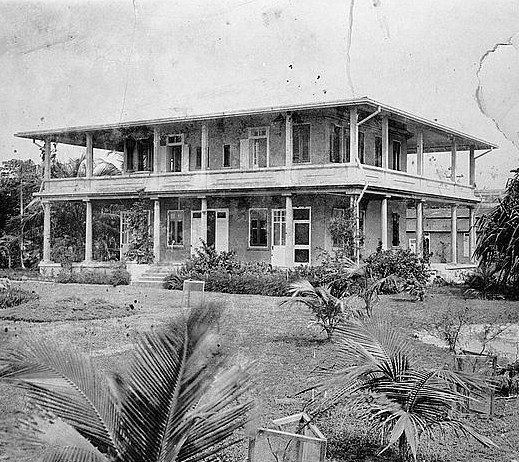
- The building in 1925.

- Location within Puerto Rico
- Location: Coast Guard Station San Juan in La Puntilla, San Juan, Puerto Rico
- Coordinates: 18°27′35″N 66°06′59″W
- Built: 1908
- MPS: Lighthouse System of Puerto Rico TR
- NRHP reference No.: 81000694
- Added to NRHP: October 22, 1981

The Superintendent of Lighthouses' Dwelling is an early 20th-century hacienda-style building located in the San Juan Coast Guard Station of La Puntilla in the Marina subdistrict (subbarrio) of Old San Juan. Although the exact date of construction is not known, deteriorated plan drawings of the old United States Naval Base that previously occupied the site of the coast guard station show that the building might have been built either in 1903 or 1908 as part of the regional lighthouses' depot. The building and its surroundings were identified as the Lighthouse Reservation at La Puntilla, with one of its earliest occupants, U.S. Lighthouse Superintendent J. P. Dillon signing and approving plan drawings by the Corps of Engineers. Although the architectural style is inspired in Spanish Revival haciendas found in both private and public buildings the United States, the specific "hacienda-style", as described by the U.S. government survey, was not indigenous nor common in Puerto Rico at the time, and the building and surrounding landscape represents the first design of its kind in the island after 1898.

== See also ==
- National Register of Historic Places listings in San Juan, Puerto Rico
