= Arsenal de San Juan =

Antiguo Arsenal de la Marina Española en San Juan
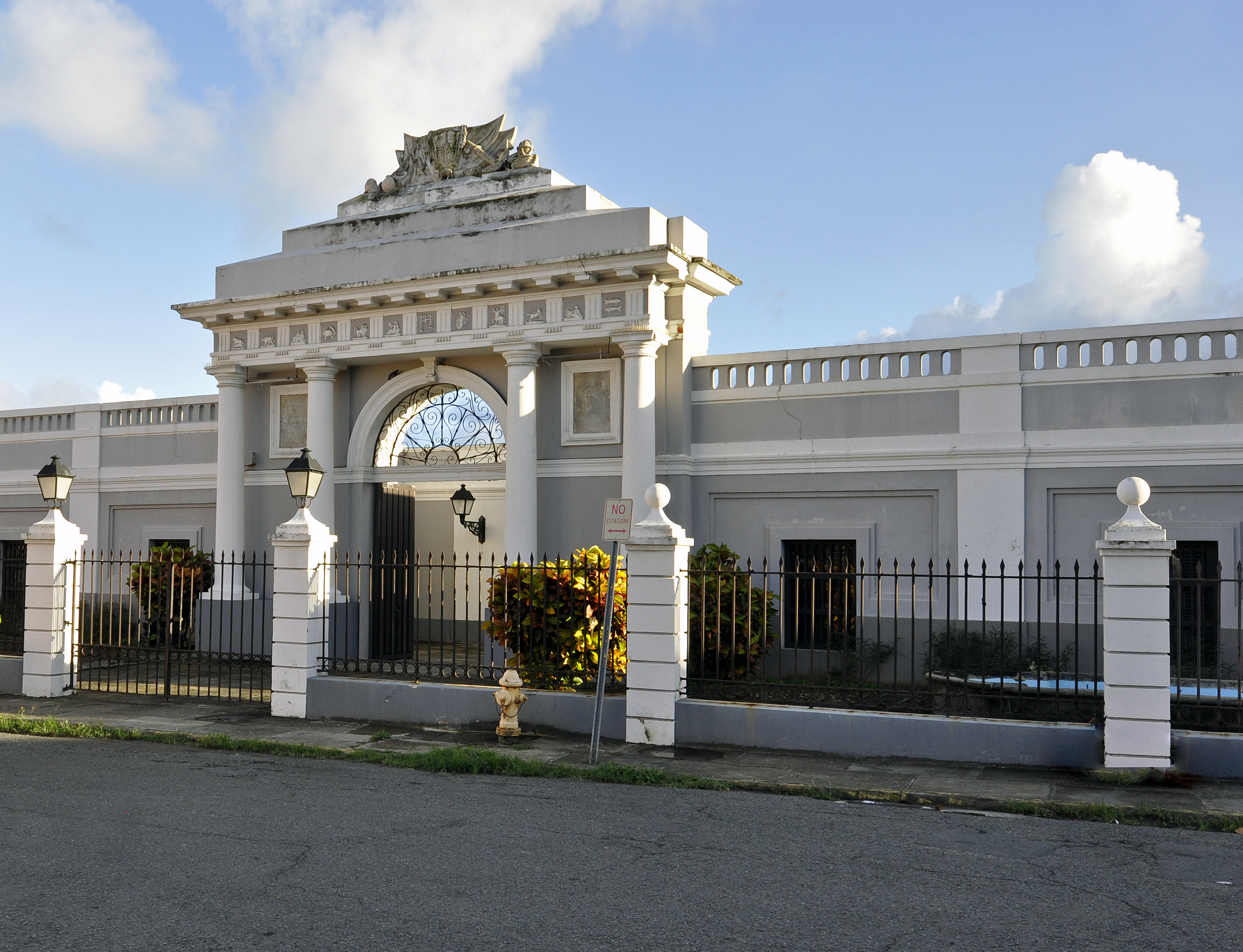
- Northern Neoclassical entrance

- Location in Puerto Rico
- 18°27′58″N 66°6′6″W
- Location: Old San Juan, San Juan, Puerto Rico

History
- Built: 1800-1854
- Built for: Spanish Navy

Site notes
- Architectural styles: Neoclassical and Spanish Colonial
- Governing body: Instituto de Cultura Puertorriqueña
- Owner: Government of Puerto Rico

U.S. National Historic Landmark District – Contributing property
- Designated: October 10, 1972
- Part of: Old San Juan Historic District
- Reference no.: 72001553

The former Spanish Navy Arsenal of San Juan (Spanish: Arsenal de la Marina Española), historically known as the San Juan Naval Station and also known as the Navy Arsenal of La Puntilla (Arsenal de la Marina de la Puntilla), the Arsenal of San Juan (Arsenal de San Juan) or simply El Arsenal, is a historic building complex and former Spanish Navy armory located in La Puntilla, a former neighborhood of the Old San Juan historic district in San Juan, Puerto Rico. It was built in 1800 at the site of the old main port of San Juan, today the Old San Juan marine and cruise piers area between the former United States Custom House and the Coast Guard Station.

== History ==
The area where the arsenal was built was originally a small peninsula covered in mangroves located at the southwestern end of the docking areas of San Juan Islet portion of the Port of San Juan. The first permanent arsenal building on site dates to 1800 with further modifications and more recent structures built around it throughout the 19th century. Although originally built as an armory, the complex quickly became the main base of operations of the Spanish Navy in the San Juan Bay with the addition of administrative offices, docks, barracks and a chapel.

During the Spanish–American War it was the last military structure to be held by Spanish forces before their defeat. After 1898 the building became the property of the United States federal government before being handled over to the government of Puerto Rico. As of today, the arsenal complex is one of the many historic properties administered by the Institute of Puerto Rican Culture (ICP) and it hosts administrative offices, event venues and temporary exhibition halls.

== Gallery ==
Historical images

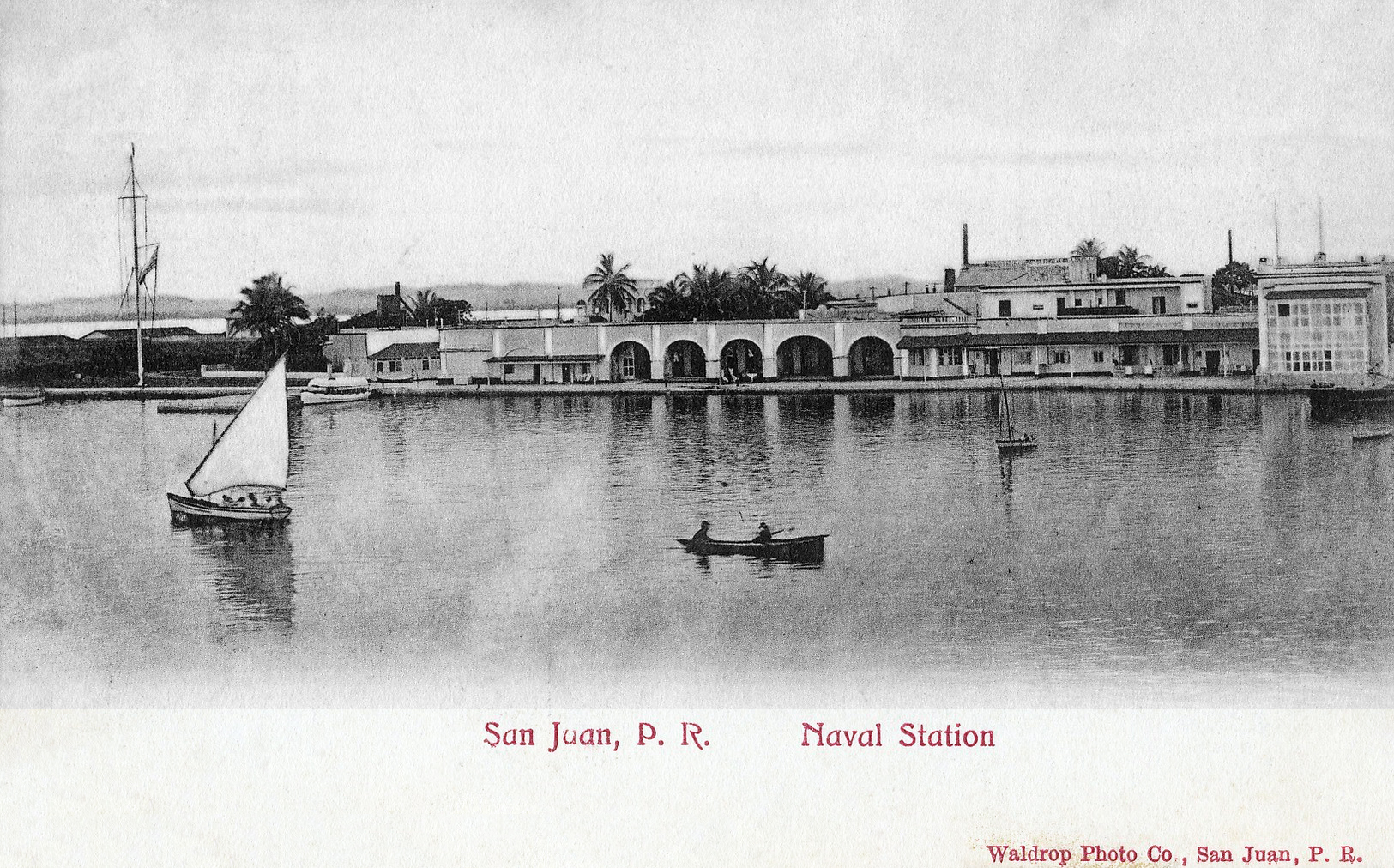
circa 1905

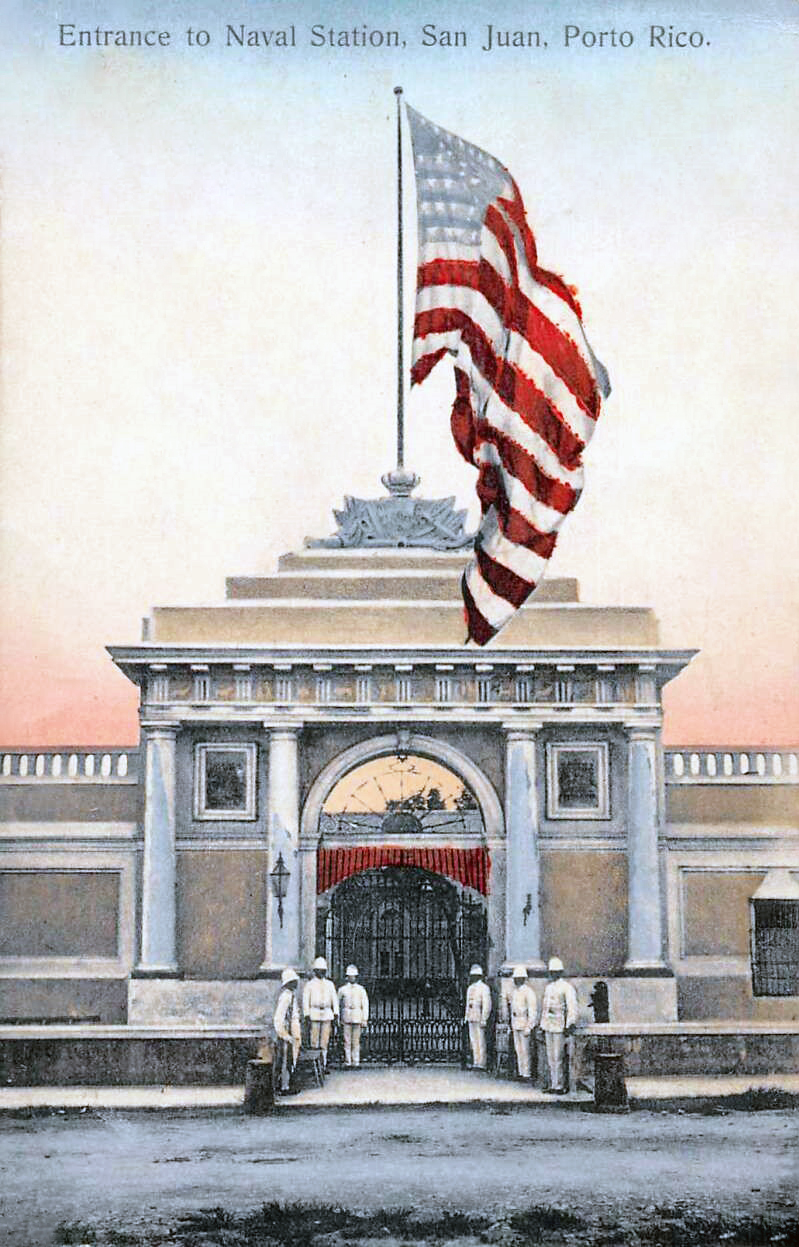
circa 1907

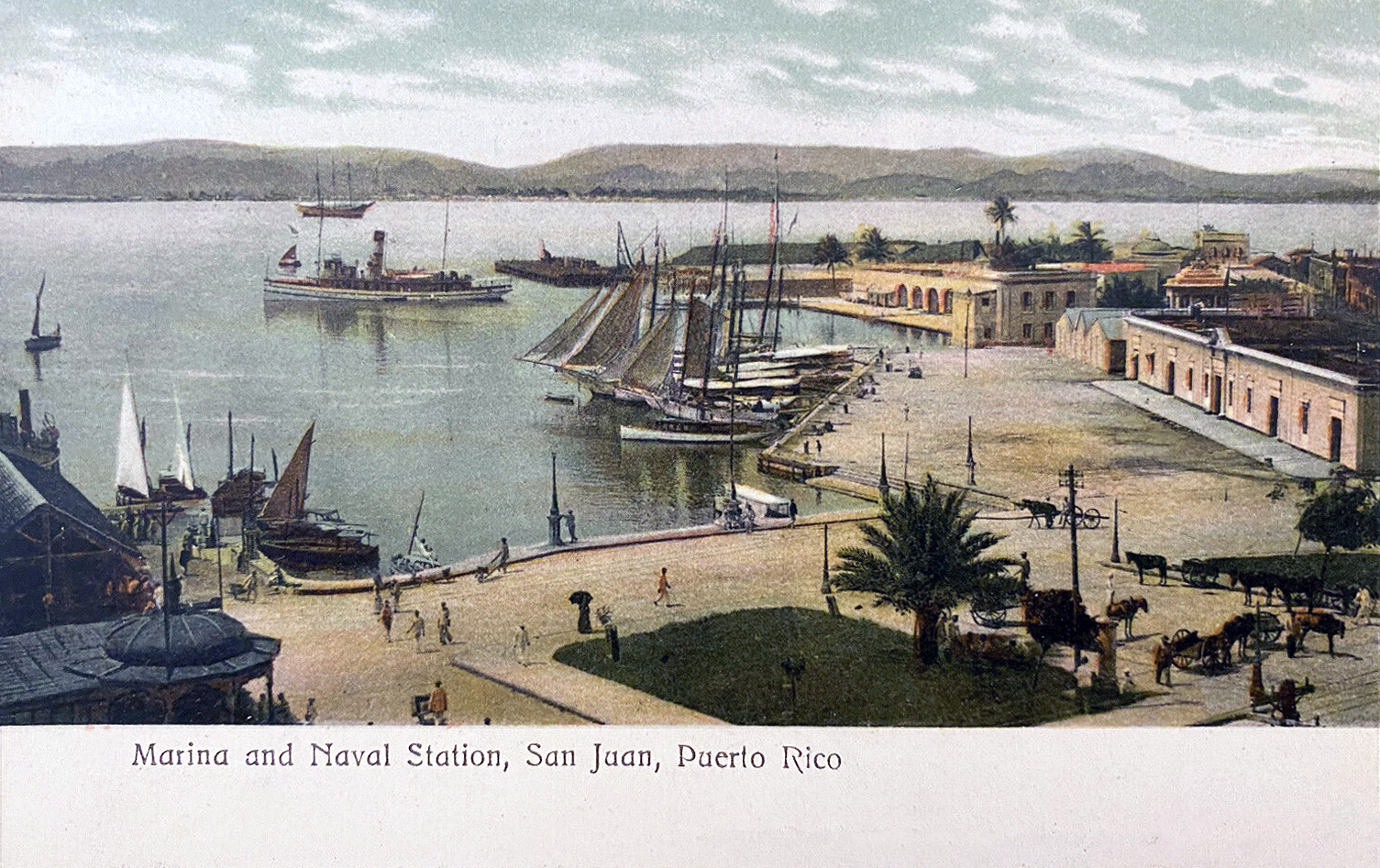
circa 1907
Arsenal complex structural details

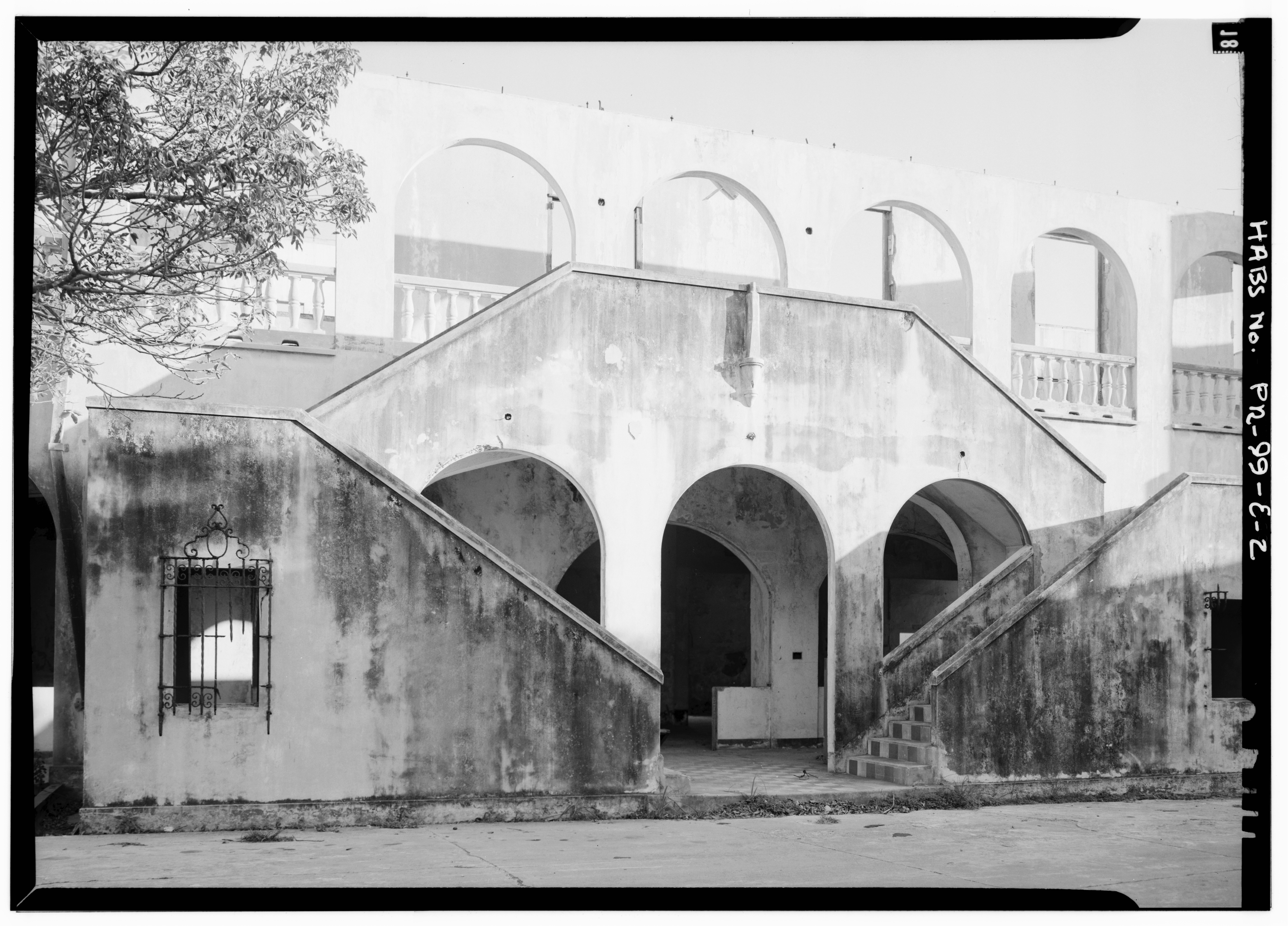
Inner courtyard

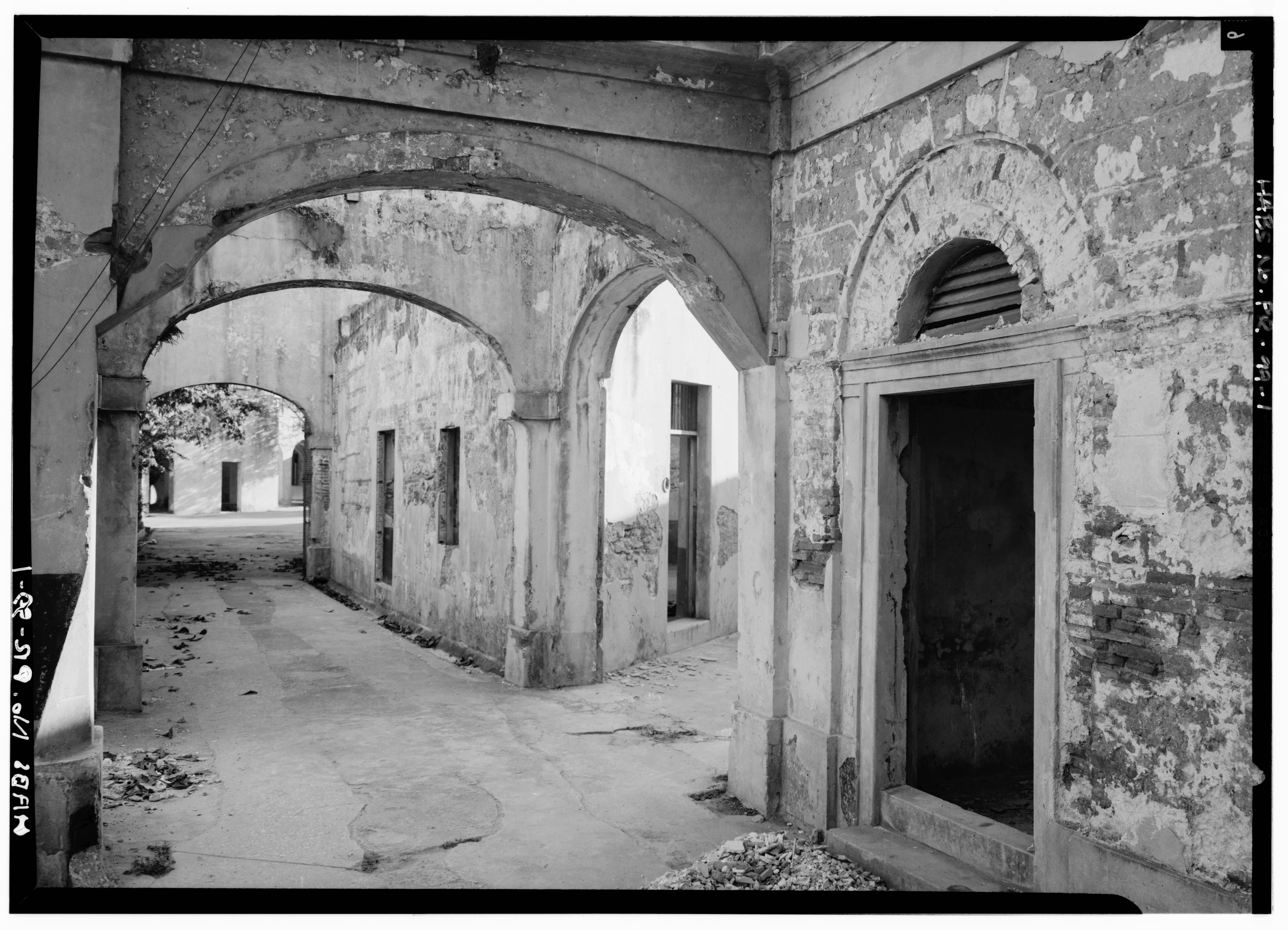
Storagerooms

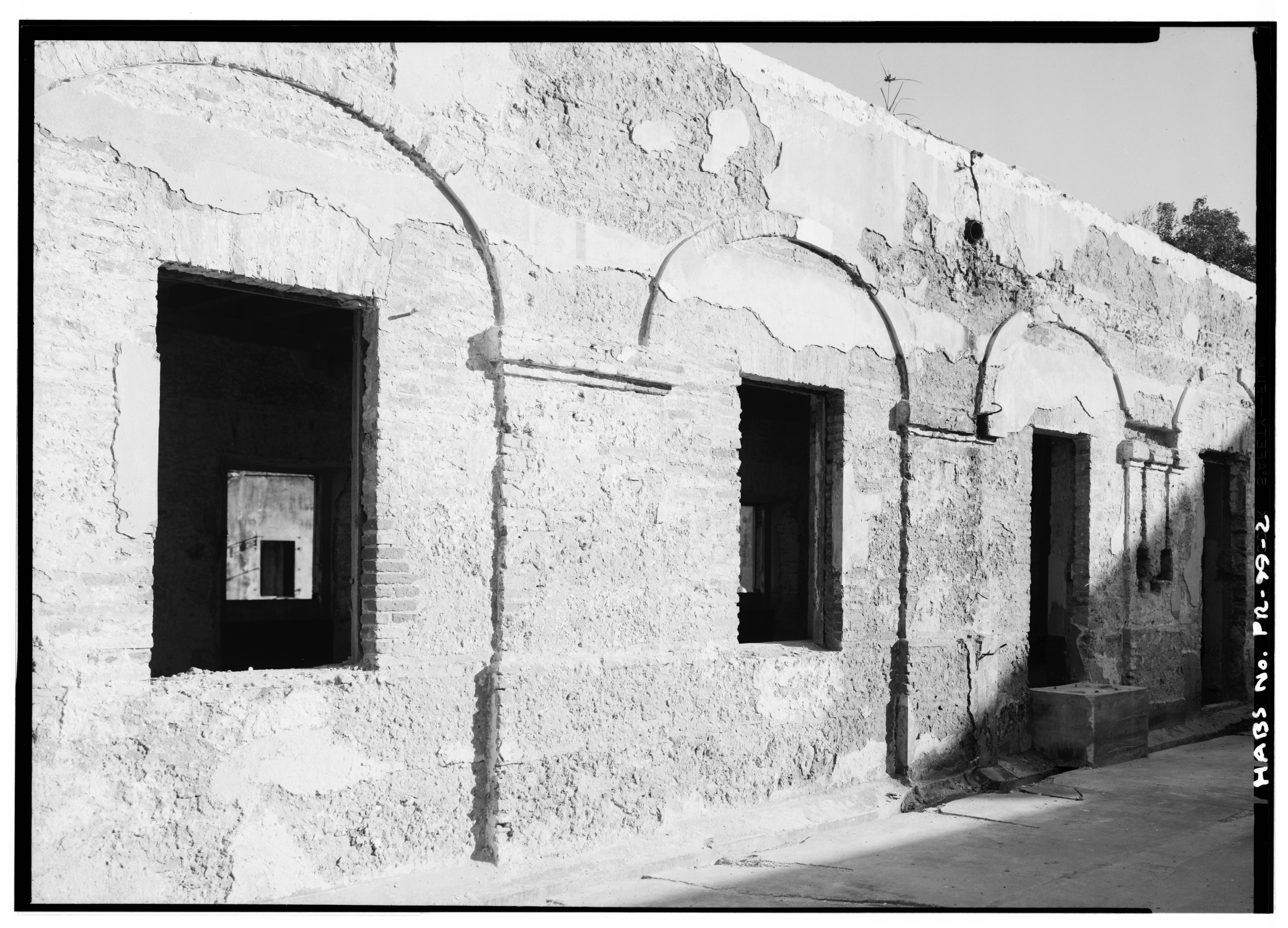
Arched walls

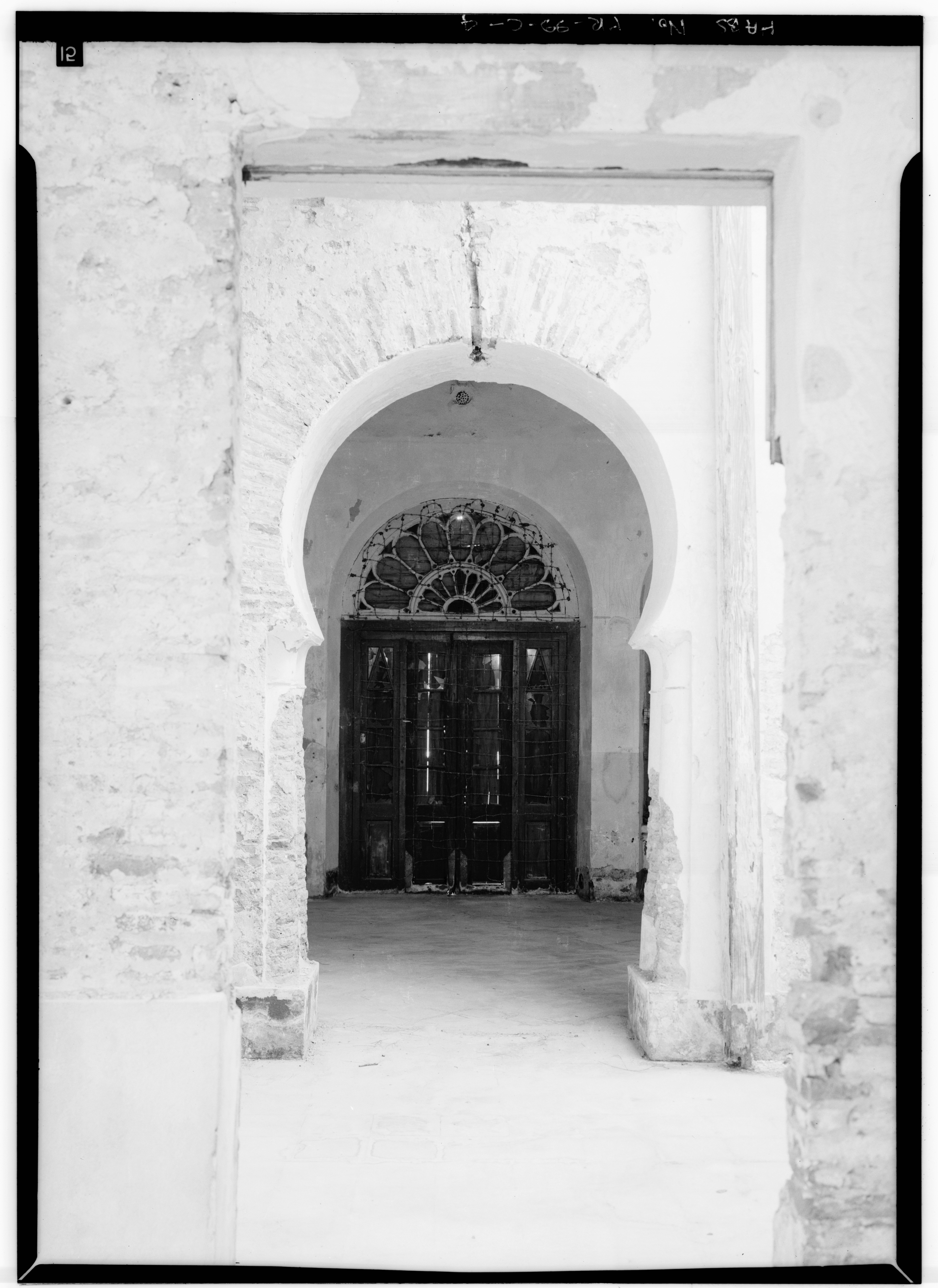
Moorish arcades

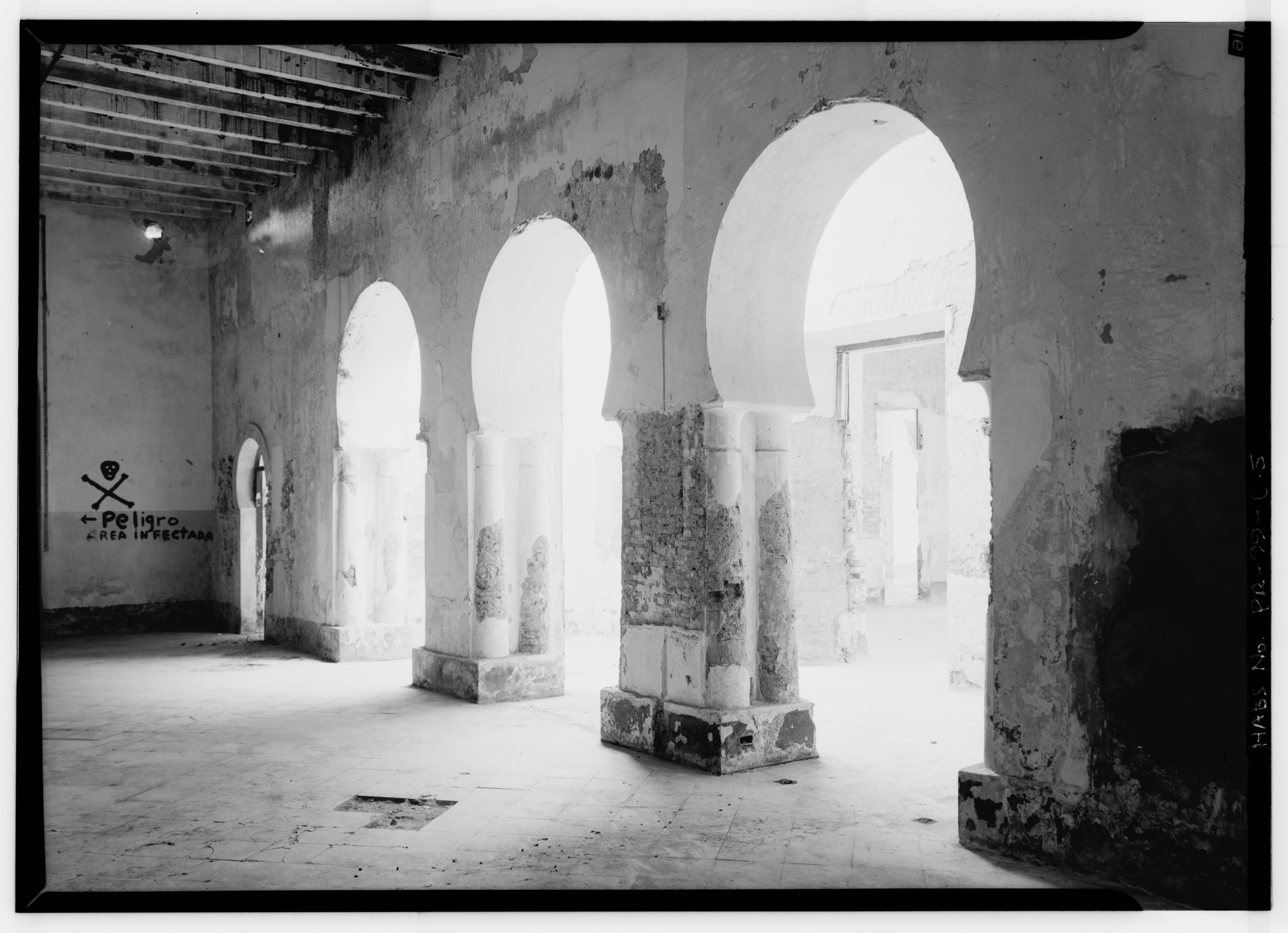
Moorish arcades

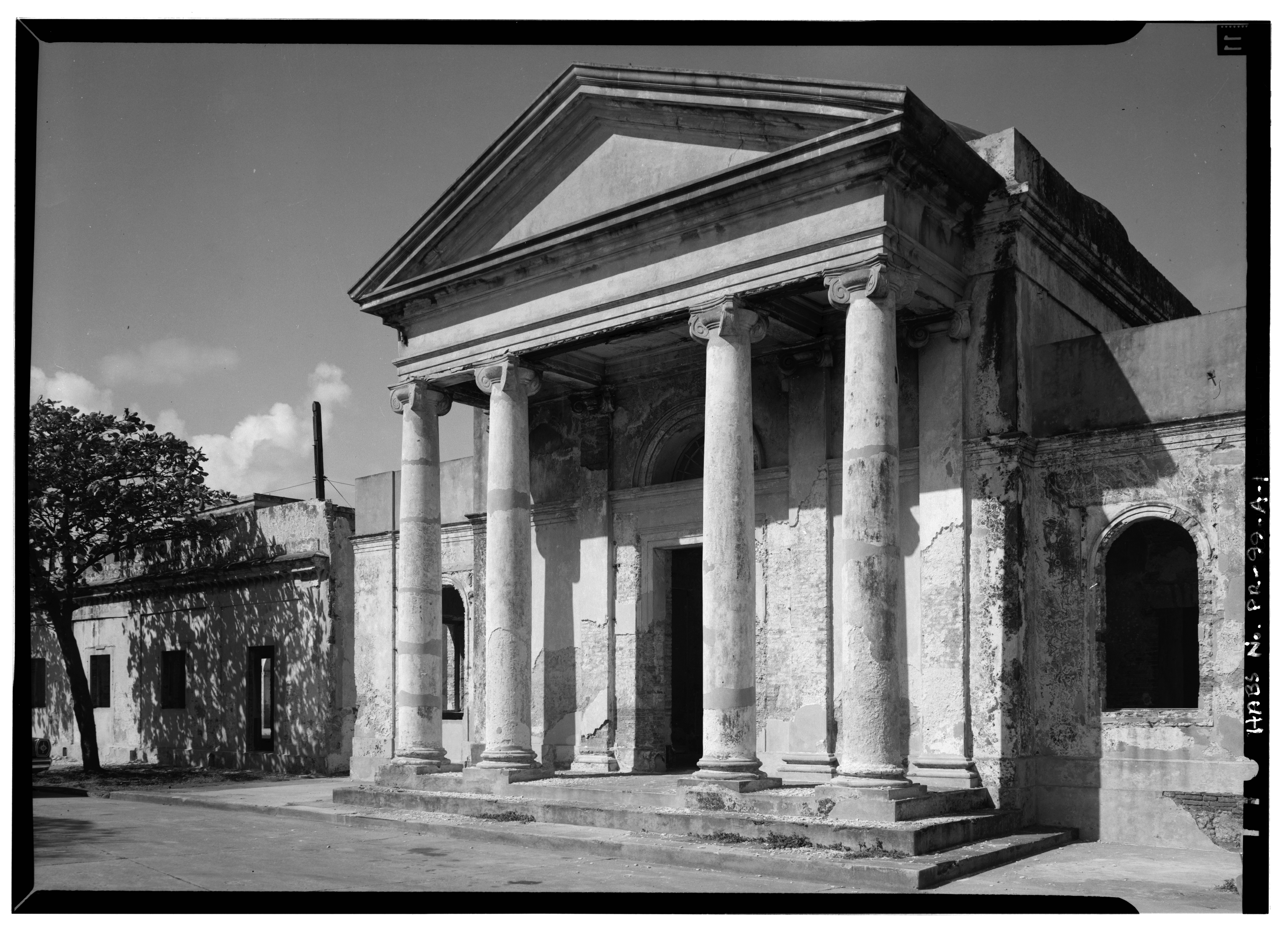
Chapel façade

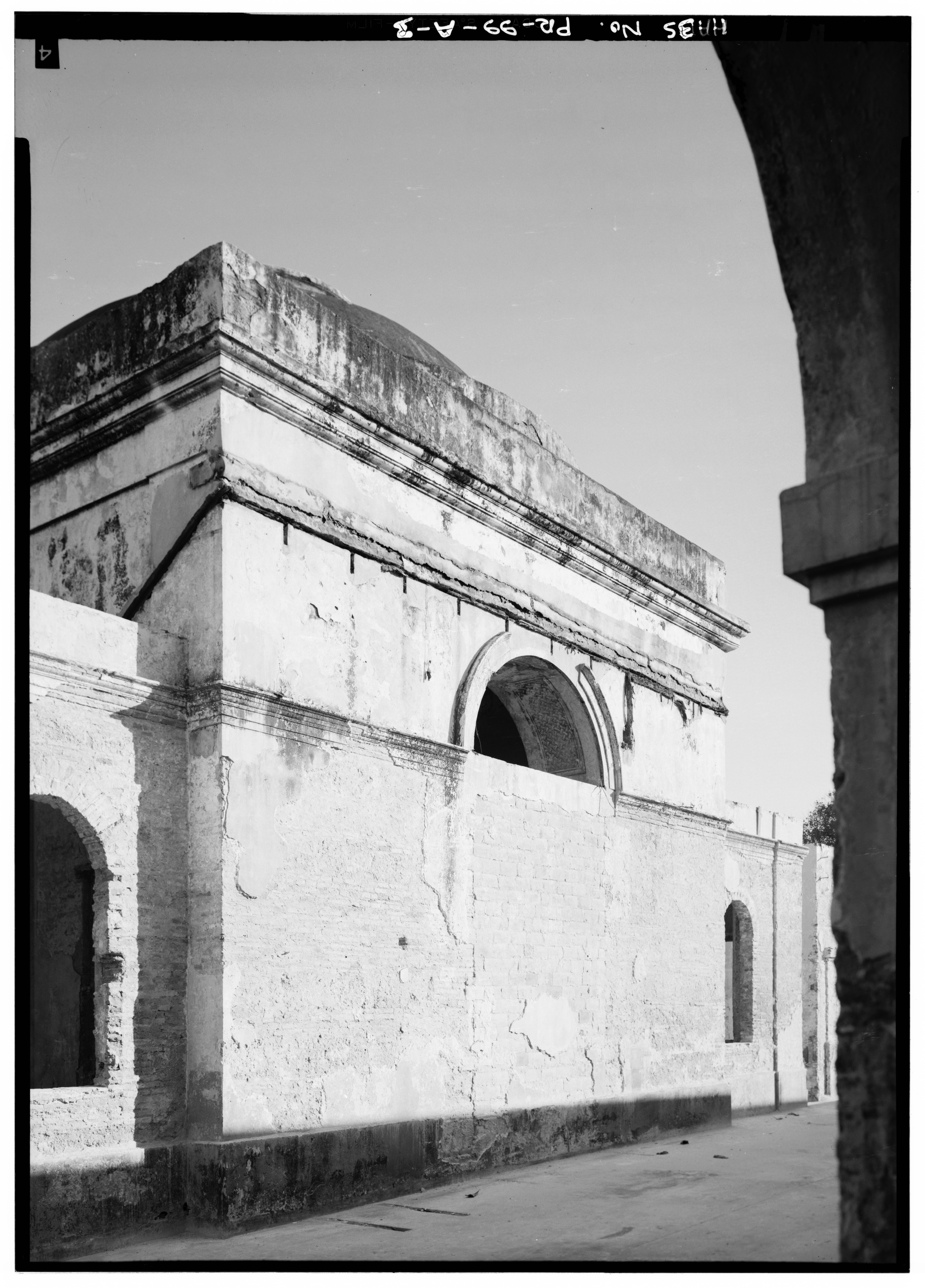
Chapel exterior

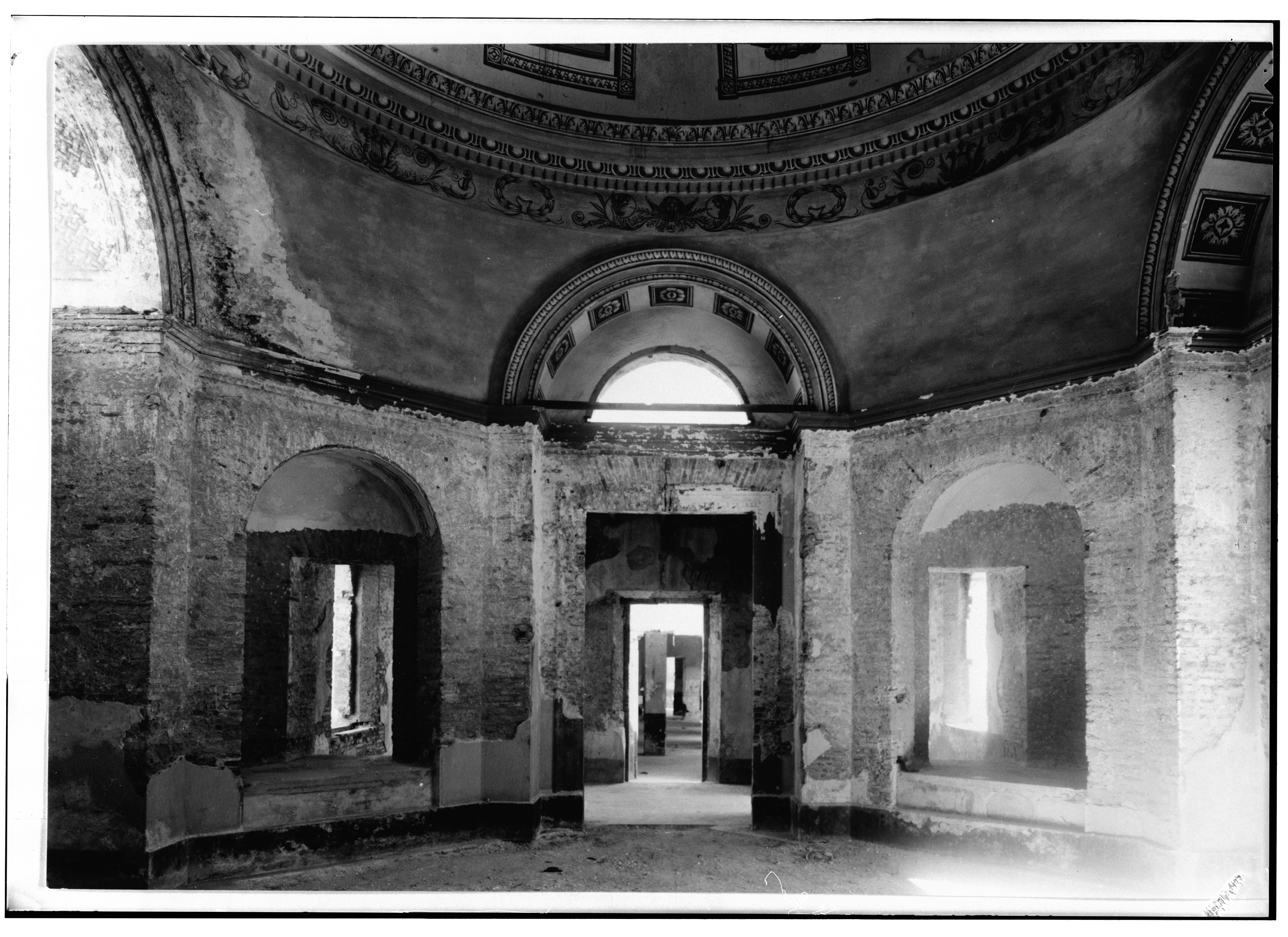
Arsenal chapel interior

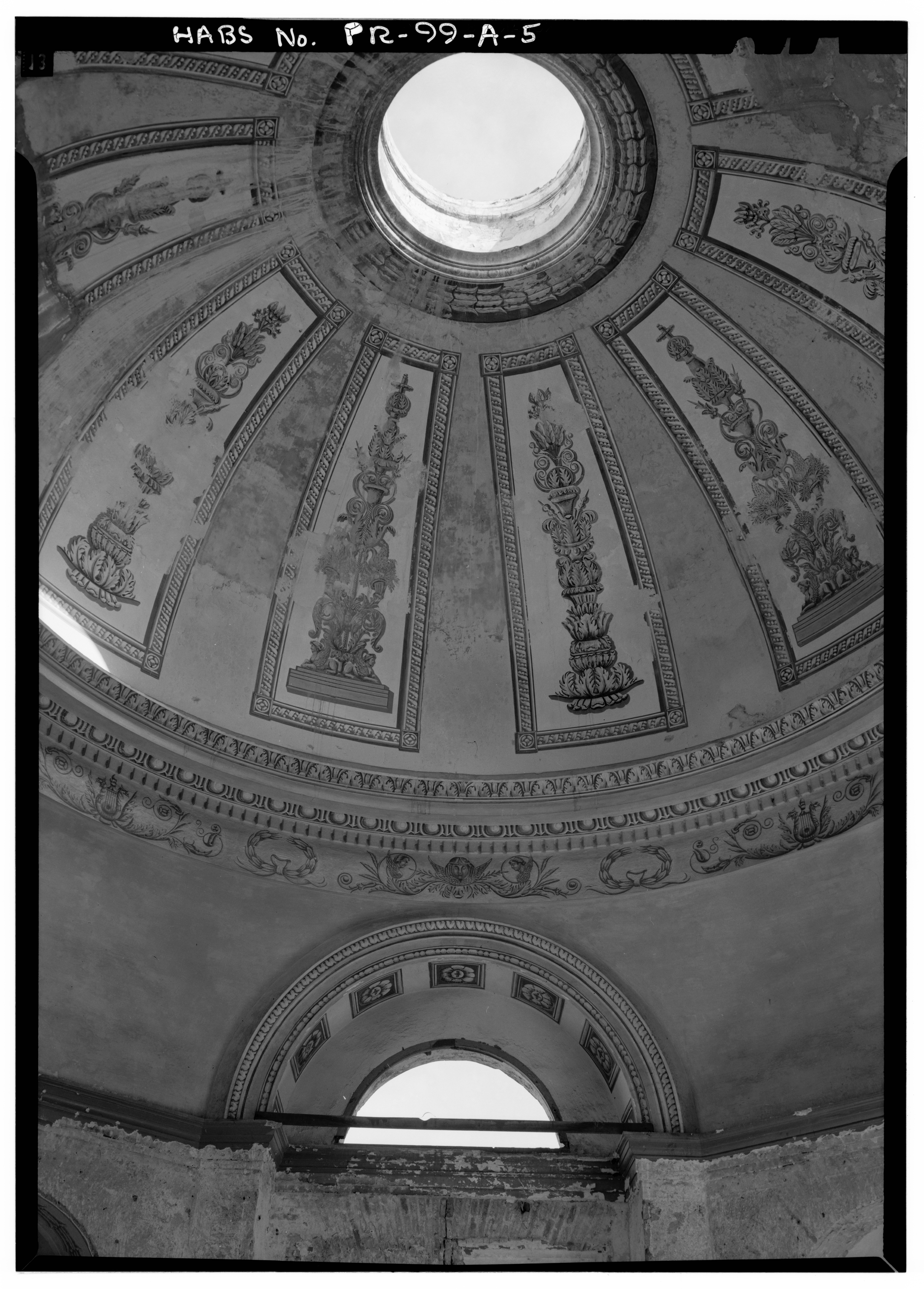
Chapel interior
Modern day complex

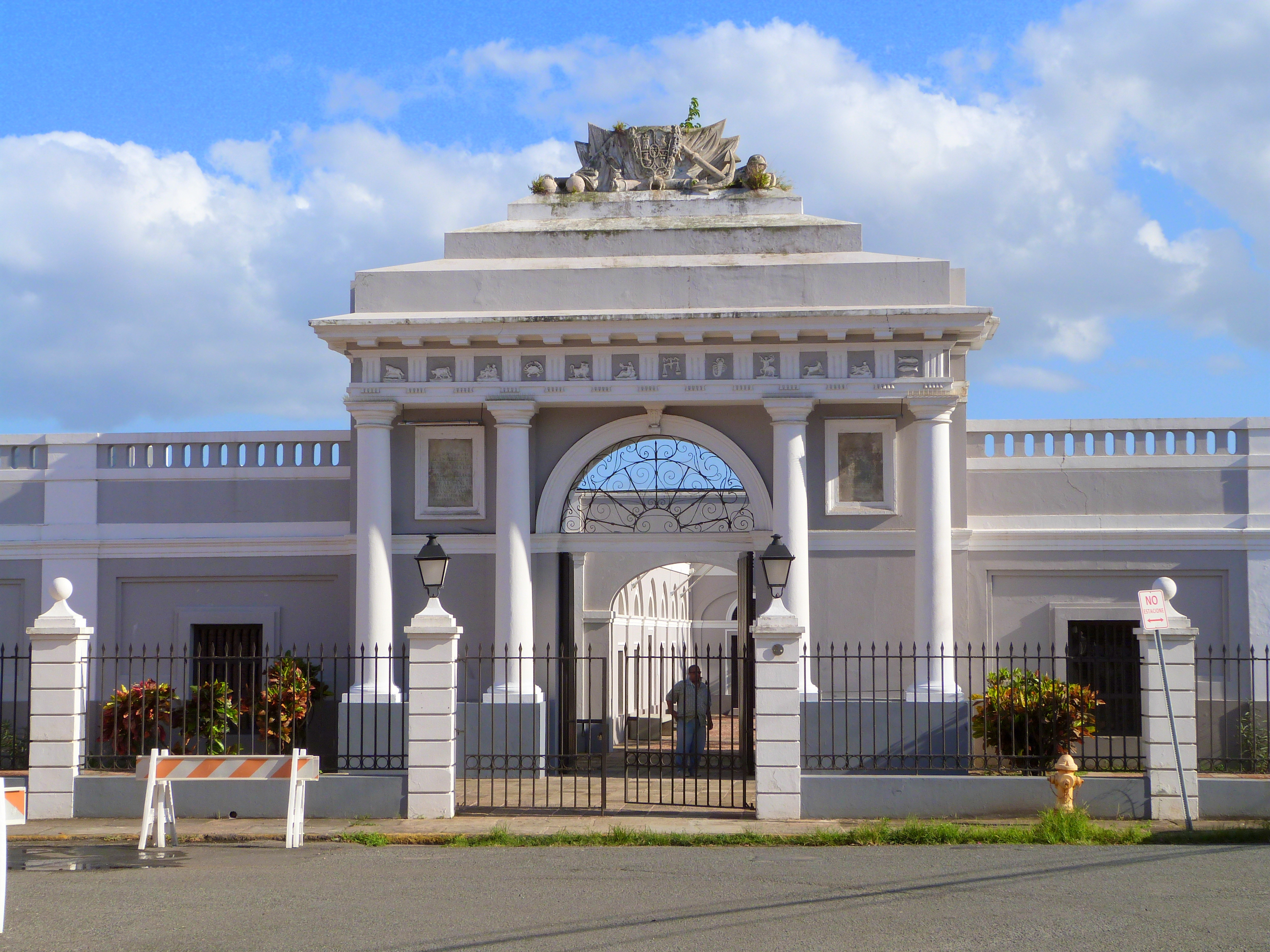
Entrance building in 2017

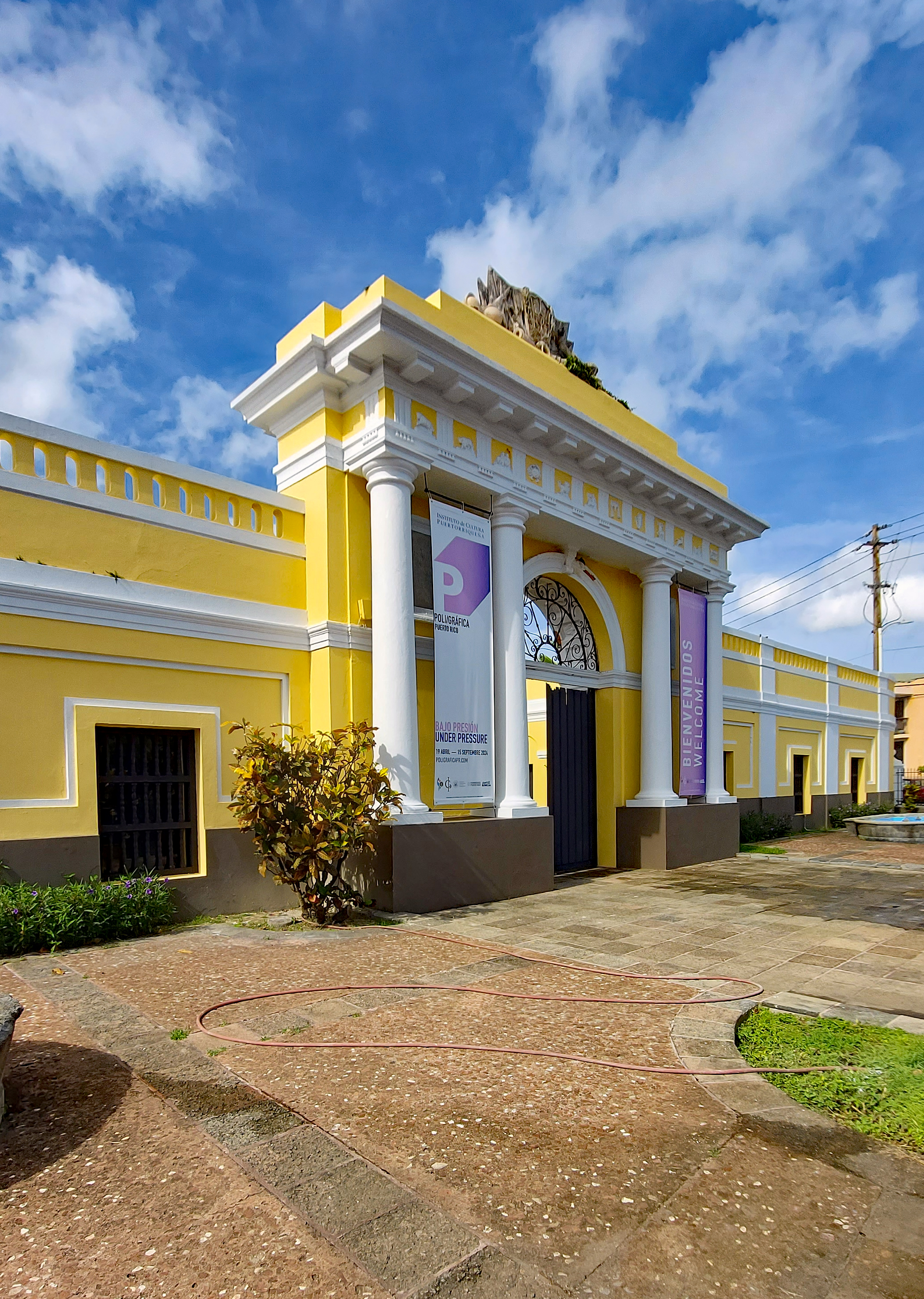
Arsenal entrance during the Poli/Gráfica biennale (2024)

== See also ==
- Ballajá Barracks
