= Marina, Old San Juan =

Subbarrio of San Juan Antiguo in Puerto Rico

Marina
- Subbarrio
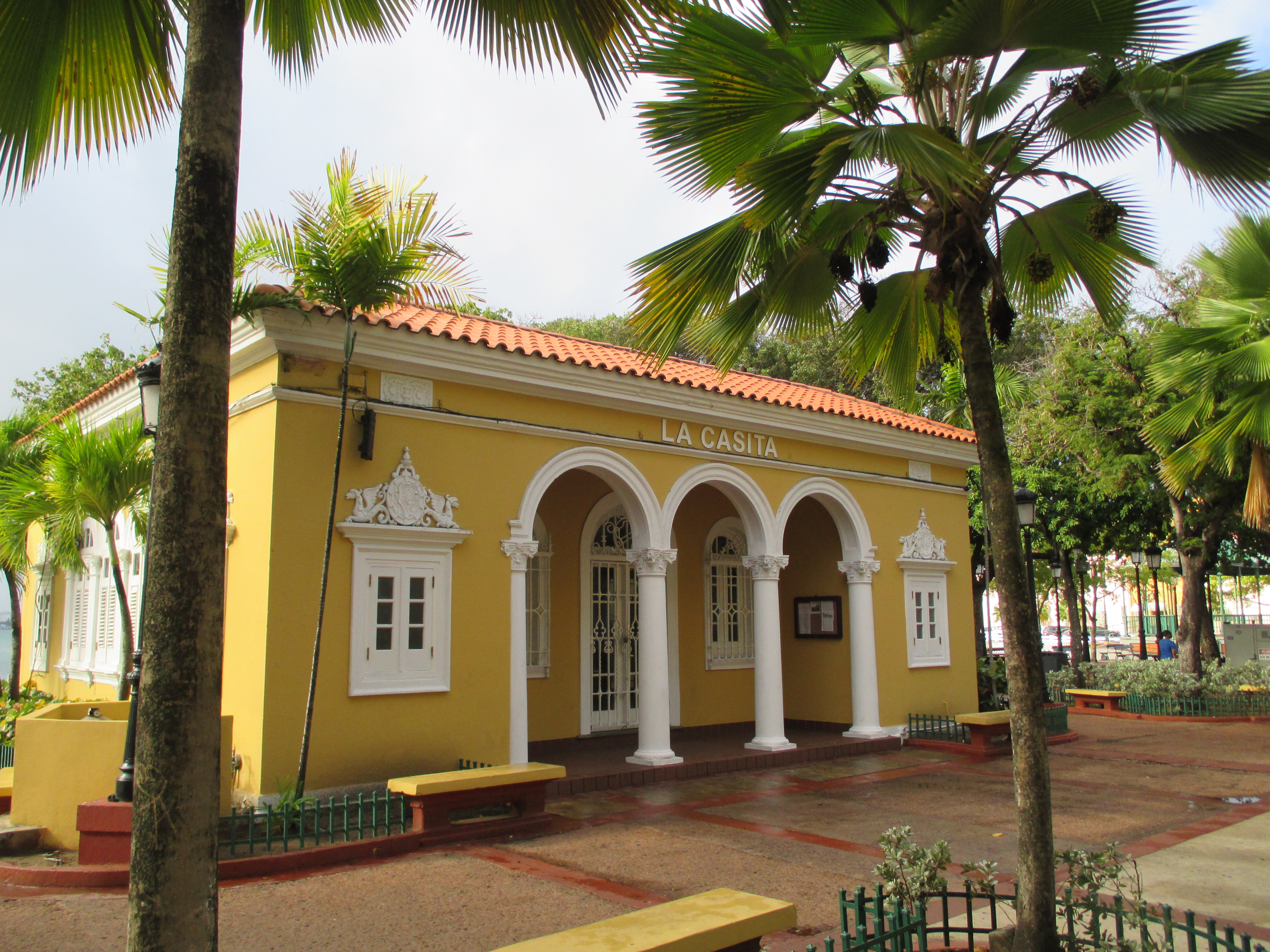
- Plaza de la Marina

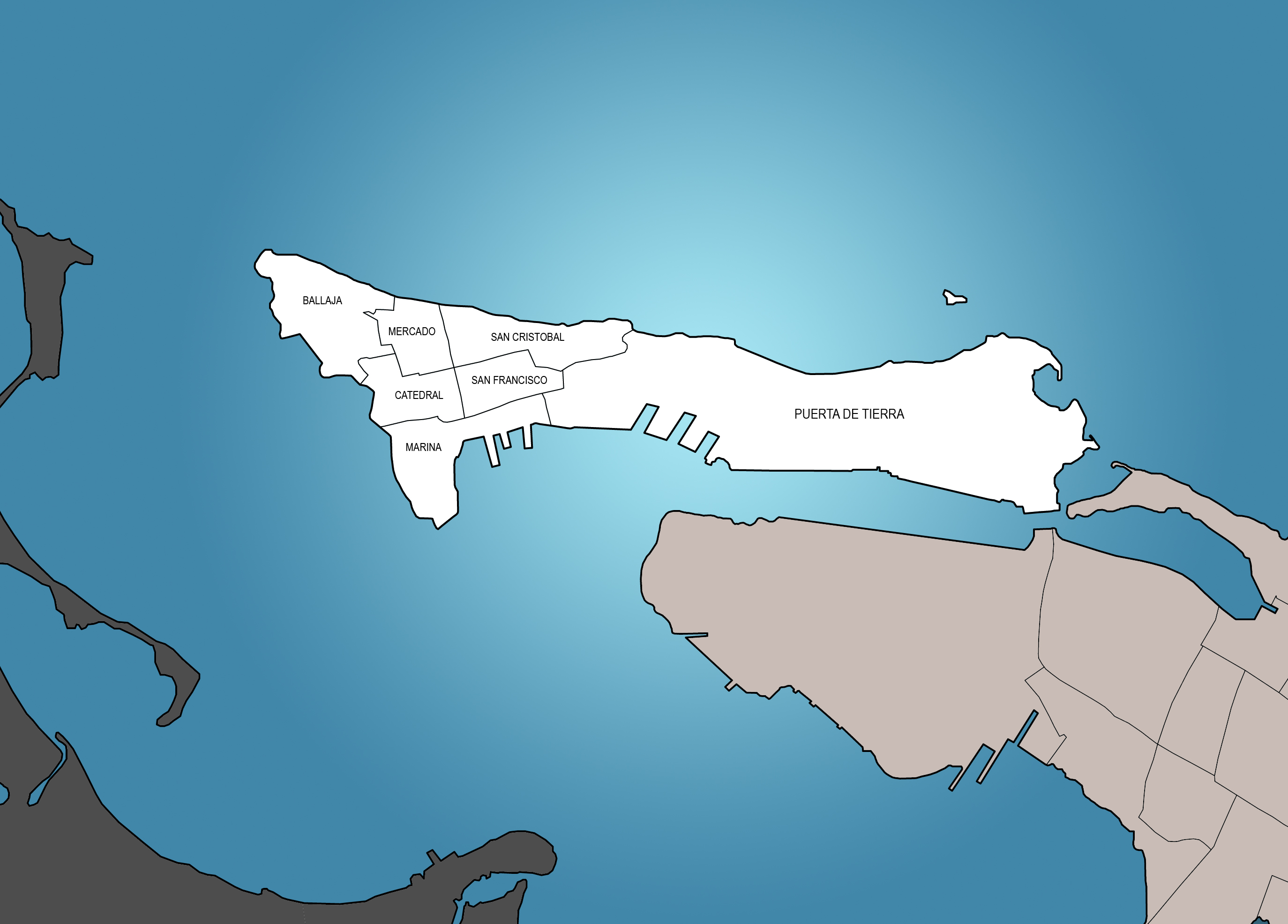
- Marina in San Juan Antiguo

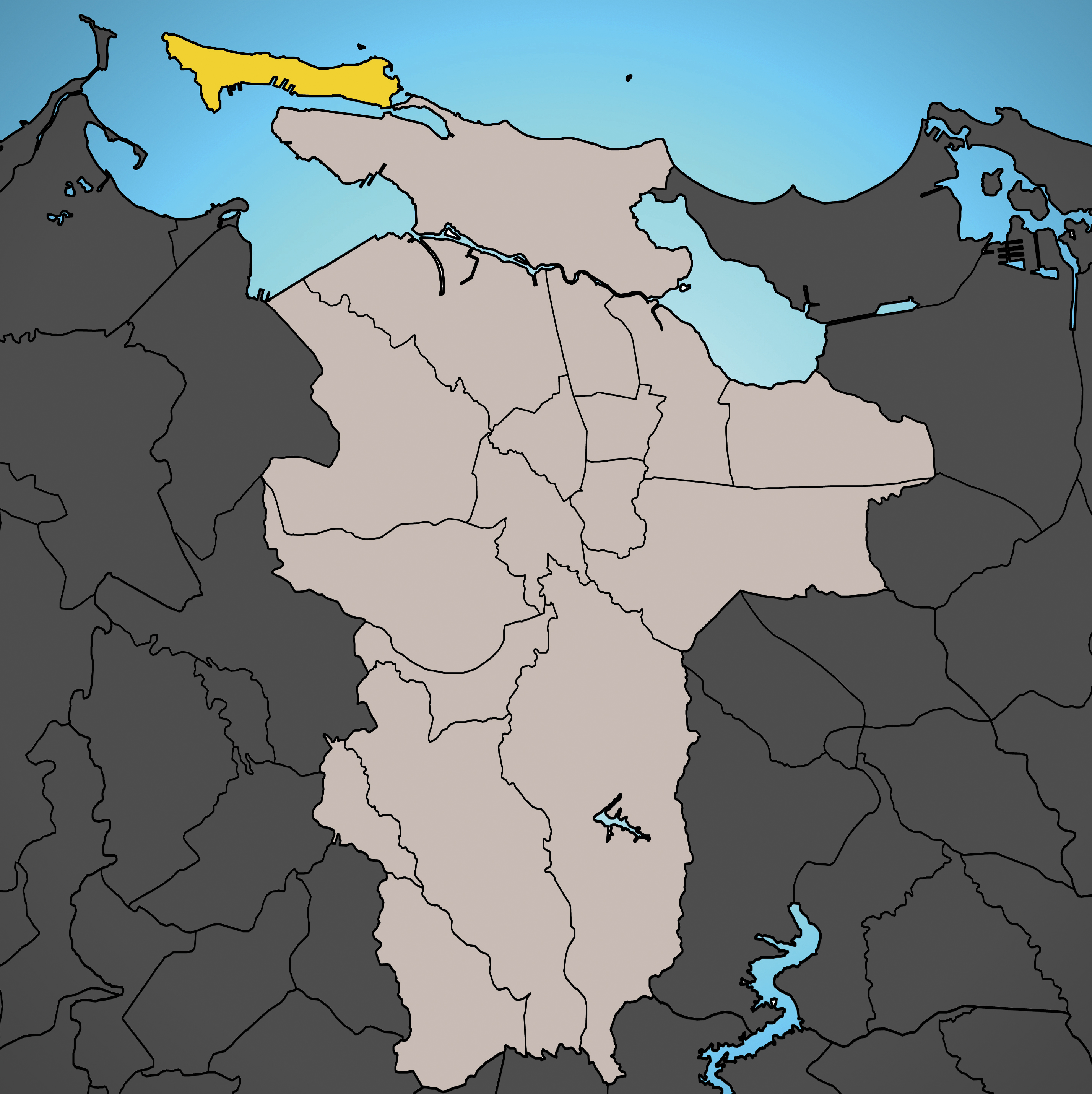
- San Juan Antiguo is in San Juan

- San Juan is in Puerto Rico
- Coordinates: 18.463118°N 66.115225°W
- Commonwealth: Puerto Rico
- Municipality: San Juan
- Barrio: San Juan Antiguo

Marina is one of 7 subbarrios of the San Juan Antiguo barrio in the municipality of San Juan in Puerto Rico. Marina, named after the oldest portion of the Port of San Juan located there, is one of the six subbarrios which form part of the Old San Juan Historic District.

== History ==
Located on a low-lying coastal strip in the southeastern tip of the Isleta de San Juan, the Marina subbarrio traces its origins to the early Spanish colonial period, when it occupied the area immediately east of the newly established walled-portions of the city. The area was not fully developed yet during this time, serving primarily logistical and maritime functions, supporting nearby docks and acting as a buffer zone between the fortified city and the bay. Puerta de Agua and Puerta de Tierra ('water' and 'land gates', respectively) were built to provide access from the port into the walled city. The area where Paseo de la Princesa is located today was an open field often used by the Spanish military, and it was not until the late 18th century that it was developed. The first permanent project to be built there were La Princesa Prison, officially called the Royal Prison of La Princesa (Real Cárcel La Princesa), erected in the 1830s, and the Royal Spanish Arsenal, built between 1800 and 1854. Interest in the development of the area grew during the 19th century, at a time when San Juan began expanding beyond its defensive walls, prompting the demolition of the southern portion of the wall in order to provide the city with direct access into the docks. Paseo de la Princesa was built in the 1850s under the patronage of Queen Isabella II of Spain. The proximity to the main docks further contributed to the area’s development. Several custom houses and international trade institutions were established in the area at the time, most famously the United States Custom House built in the last decade of the 19th century. The current iteration of this building dates to 1931. By the late 1800s, Marina had evolved into a small but defined community on the edge of the city. This community, popularly known as La Puntilla, was torn down during the early 20th century in order to expand and modernize the infrastructure of the port. Due to its prime location, in 1914 the United States government established a post office and federal courthouse in the northeastern corner of the large parcel of land formerly occupied by a small Spanish bastion, located directly across from the port. This building still continues to function as the courthouse for the United States District Court for the District of Puerto Rico. The US Coast Guard station of San Juan is also located in the area of La Puntilla.

== Demographics ==
Historical population
Census	Pop.	Note	%±
1900	2,144		—
1910	2,605		21.5%
1920	1,895		−27.3%
1930	2,167		14.4%
1940	1,644		−24.1%
1950	1,610		−2.1%
1980	403		—
1990	391		−3.0%
2000	416		6.4%
U.S. Decennial Census; 1900 (uses 1899 data) 1910-1930; 1930-1950 1980-2000 2010

== Cityscape ==
=== Places of Interest ===
- Arsenal de San Juan
- Coast Guard Station San Juan
  - Superintendent of Lighthouses' Dwelling
- Jose V. Toledo Federal Building and Courthouse
- Port of San Juan cruise ship terminal
  - Cataño Ferry Terminal
- United States Custom House

=== Main streets and squares ===
- Calle de la Tanca
- Comercio Street
- Gilberto Concepción de Gracia Street
- Paseo de la Princesa
- Plaza Dársena (Plaza de la Marina)
- Plaza Eugenio María de Hostos
- Plazoleta de San Juan
- Recinto Sur Street
