= Coast Guard Station San Juan =

US Coast Guard station in Puerto Rico

- Part of Seventh District
- San Juan, Puerto Rico
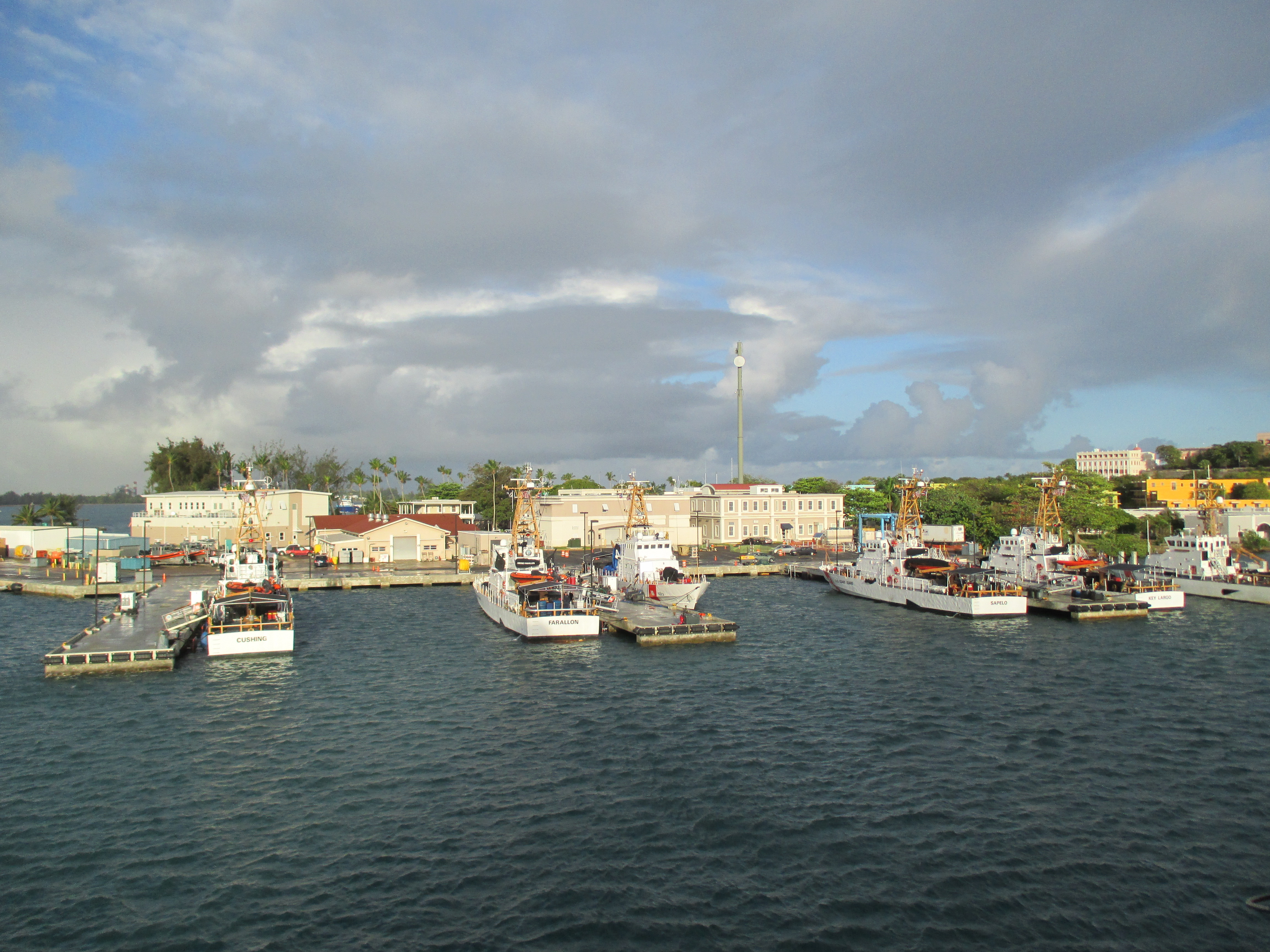
- Coast Guard Sector San Juan (2015)

Site information
- Type: Coast Guard Station

Location
- Coordinates: 18°27′37″N 66°06′59″W

Site history
- Built: 1993
- In use: 1993 – present

United States Coast Guard Station San Juan is a United States Coast Guard station established in 1993 and located in La Puntilla sector of historic Old San Juan, Puerto Rico. Is one of two USCG Search and Rescue station in the Caribbean. Duties at Coast Guard Station San Juan also include law enforcement, Federal On Scene Coordinator (FOSC), Area Maritime Security Coordinator (AMSC) and the Electronic Systems Support Detachment San Juan, Puerto Rico (ESDD SAN JUAN). Coast Guard Station San Juan also conducts escorts of cruise ships and some Navy assets entering and departing San Juan Bay.

The Marine Safety Detachment (MSD) is located on the Island of Saint Thomas, U.S. Virgin Islands.
