= List of Puerto Rico landmarks =

This is a list of landmarks in Puerto Rico. These are either tourist attractions, places of interest or famous landmarks located in Puerto Rico. The list is divided among the 78 municipalities of the island.

== Adjuntas ==
- Adjuntas Pueblo and its central plaza
- Casa Pueblo
- Castillo de los Niños
- El Gigante Dormido
- Garzas Lake
- Guilarte State Forest
- Las Cabañas Bridge
- Villa Sotomayor

== Aguada ==
- Aguada Museum and Historic Railway Station
- Aguada Pueblo and its main plaza
- Aguada transmission station, the tallest man-made structure in Puerto Rico
- Christopher Columbus Landing Monument and Cross
- Church of San Francisco de Asís
- Coloso Bridge
- Coloso Sugar Cane Refinery
- Espinar Beach
- Pico Piedra Beach
- The Aguada Pyramid

== Aguadilla ==
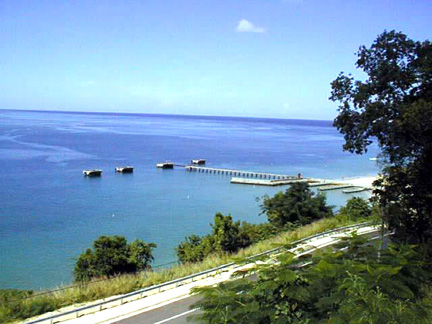
Crash Boat Beach

- Aguadilla Pueblo and its plazas
- Aguadilla Ice Skating Arena
- Aguadilla Museum of Art in the former District Courthouse
- Cardona Residence
- Iglesia de San Carlos Borromeo
- Crash Boat Beach
- Cristobal Colón Park
- El Parterre
- Fisherman's Monument
- Fuerte de la Concepción
- Gas Chambers Beach
- Las Cascadas Water Park
- López Residence
- Punta Borinquen and its lighthouse
- Punta Borinquen Golf Course
- Rafael Hernández Monument
- Rompeolas Beach
- Surfer's Beach
- Survival Beach

== Aguas Buenas ==
- Aguas Buenas Cave and Caverns System Natural Reserve
- Aguas Buenas Pueblo and its main plaza
- El Mirador Walkway
- Hacienda Cascada
- La Charca Recreational Center
- Parque de Bombas Maximiliano Merced
- Monte La Tiza

== Aibonito ==
- Aibonito Pueblo and its main plaza
- Asomante Memorial and historic battleground
- Church San José of Aibonito
- El Mirador overlook
- Federico Degetau House Museum
- Festival of Flowers (June)
- Historic Moscoso Pharmacy of Aibonito
- La Piedra de Degetau park and scenic area
- Old Encanto Theater
- San Cristóbal Canyon

== Añasco ==
- Añasco Pueblo and its main plaza
- Añasco Beach
- Church of San Antonio Abad
- Hacienda La Eugenia
- Diego Salcedo Fountain
- Salto de la Encantada waterfall
- Tres Hermanos Beach
- Villa Pesquera

== Arecibo ==
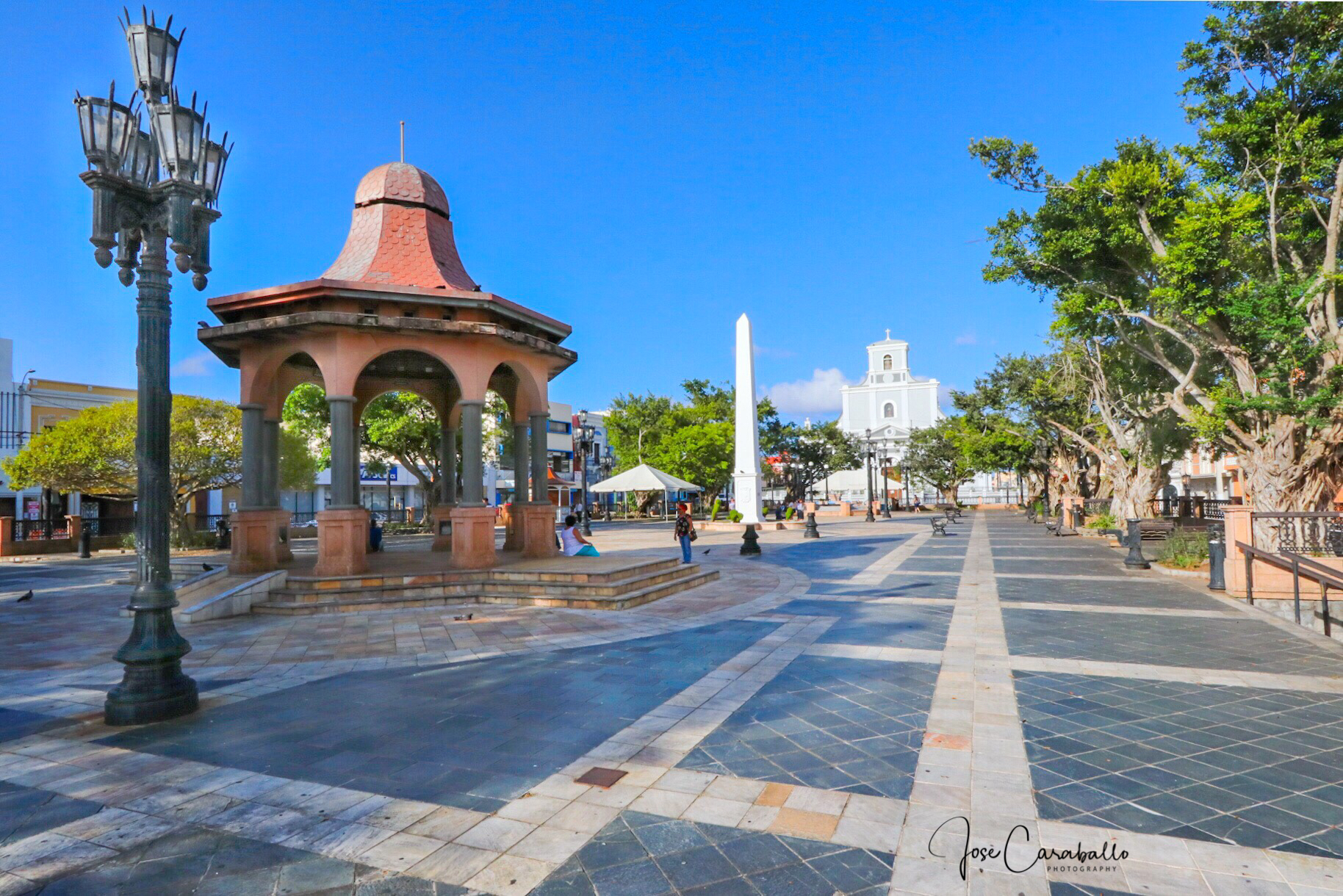
Plaza de Arecibo

- Historic Arecibo Pueblo
- Arecibo City Hall
- Arecibo Harbor
- Arecibo Observatory, site of the former Arecibo Telescope
- Birth of the New World, tallest statue in America
- Cambalache State Forest
- Caño Tiburones swamp
- Cathedral of San Felipe Apóstol
- Cueva Ventana
- Dos Bocas Lake
- El Indio Cave and petroglyphs
- Las Tunas Beach
- Los Morillos Beach
- Los Negritos Beach
- Manuel "Petaca" Iguina Coliseum
- Museum of Art and History of Arecibo
- Historic Oliver Building
- Paseo Víctor Rojas
- Poza del Obispo Beach
- Punta Morrillos Lighthouse
- Trina Padilla de Sanz House Museum

== Arroyo ==
- Arroyo Pueblo and its main plaza
- Arroyo Surfing Park
- Enrique Huyke Monument
- Hacienda La Cora
- Las Palmas Beach
- Malecón Paseo Las Américas
- Old Customs House of Arroyo
- Punta de las Figuras Light
- Punta Guilarte Beach
- Samuel Morse Monument
- Train of the South

== Barceloneta ==
- Barceloneta Pueblo and its plazas
- Barceloneta Cultural Center
- Cambalache State Forest
- Caño Tiburones swamp
- Hacienda Marqués de la Esperanza Ruins
- La Monserrate Refinery Ruins
- Las Criollas Beach
- Machuca Beach, black sand beach
- Malecón de la Boca
- Old Pier of Barceloneta
- Palmas Altas Beach
- Sixto Escobar Museum

== Barranquitas ==
- Barranquitas Pueblo and historic plaza
- Camp Morton Recreation Area
- El Cortijo Castle
- Luis Muñoz Rivera Birthplace house and museum
- Muñoz Rivera family mausoleum
- San Cristóbal Canyon

== Bayamón ==
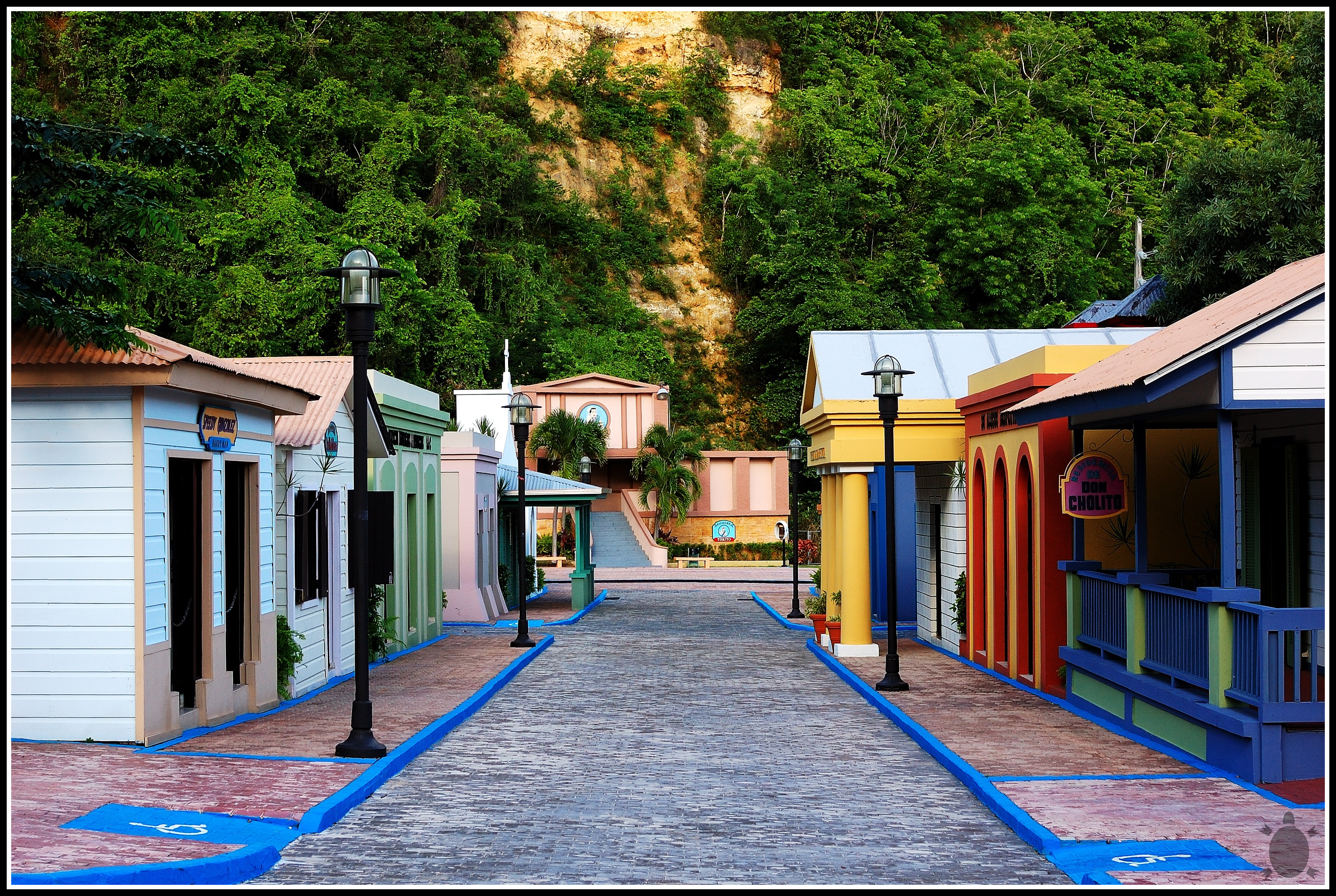
Parque de las Ciencias

- Bayamón Central Park
- Bayamón River Lineal Park
- Braulio Castillo Theater
- Casa Alcaldía de Bayamón
- Downtown Bayamón and its plaza
- Charco Prieto waterfall and natural pool
- Francisco Oller Museum
- Casa y Museo José Celso Barbosa
- Juan Ramón Loubriel Stadium
- Julio Enrique Monagas Park
- Manatee Conservation Center
- Parque de las Ciencias
- Plaza del Sol
- Plaza Rio Hondo
- Ron Del Barrilito rum distillery in Hacienda Santa Ana
- Rubén Rodríguez Coliseum

== Cabo Rojo ==
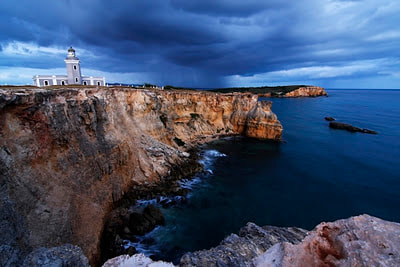
Los Morrillos Lighthouse

- Cabo Rojo Pueblo and its plaza
- Boquerón village and beach
- Boquerón State Forest
- Buyé Beach
- Cabo Rojo National Natural Landmark
- Cabo Rojo National Wildlife Refuge
- Club Deportivo del Oeste Marina and Nautical Club
- Cofresí Cave
- El Combate Beach
- Isla de Ratones
- Joyuda fishing village and beach
- Joyuda Lagoon
- Los Morrillos Lighthouse
- Old Excelsior Theater
- Playa Sucia
- Puerta Real Beach
- Punta Arenas Beach
- San Miguel Arcángel Church

== Caguas ==
- Downtown Caguas and its plaza
- Caguas Cathedral
- Caguas City Hall and History Museum
- Caguas Museum of Art
- Caguas Museum of Folk Arts
- Caguas Tobacco Museum
- Carite State Forest
- First Baptist Church of Caguas
- Hacienda Catalina Ruins in Las Catalinas Mall
- La India Dormida
- Puente No. 6, a historic bridge
- William Miranda Marín Botanical and Cultural Garden

== Camuy ==
- Camuy Pueblo and its plaza
- Camuy Caves
- Camuy History Museum
- Camuy River Boardwalk
- Hacienda Morell
- Peñon Brussi Beach
- The Stone Church
- Tres Pueblos Sinkhole

== Canóvanas ==
- Canóvanas Pueblo and its plaza
- Camarero Racetrack
- Canóvanas Sugar Mill Ruins
- El Español Bridge
- Jesús T. Piñero House
- The Old Ceiba Tree

== Carolina ==
- Downtown Carolina and its main plaza
- Buena Vista Ruins
- Carolina municipal beach
- Chabad of Puerto Rico Orthodox synagogue
- Isla Verde hotel and beach area
- Julia de Burgos Park
- Loíza River Boardwalk
- Luis Muñoz Marín International Airport
- Plaza Carolina
- Roberto Clemente Stadium and Sports City

== Cataño ==
- Downtown Cataño and its plaza
- Bacardi Cathedral of Rum
- Cataño Boardwalk

== Cayey ==
- Cayey Pueblo and its main plaza
- Arenas Bridge
- Carite State Forest
- Cayey Hall of Fame and Sports
- Guavate and its lechoneras
- Juana Rodríguez Morales House
- La Liendre Bridge
- Monumento al Jíbaro Puertorriqueño with views of Cerro Las Tetas
- Monument to the Three Magi
- Pedro Montañez Municipal Stadium
- Río Matón Bridge
- University of Puerto Rico at Cayey Museum

== Ceiba ==
- Ceiba Pueblo and its plaza
- Medio Mundo Beach
- Roosevelt Roads Naval Station

== Ciales ==
- Ciales Pueblo and its main plaza
- Ciales Museum of Coffee
- Corretjer Museum and Library
- Doña Juana Falls
- Hacienda Carvajal
- Hacienda Negrón
- Juan Antonio Corretjer Lineal Park
- Las Archillas Cave
- Las Golondrinas Cave
- Manatí Bridge
- Toro Negro State Forest

== Cidra ==
- Cidra Pueblo and its main plaza
- Hamacas Bridge
- Iberia Theater
- Lago de Cidra Recreation Area
- Parque del Niño
- Perico Waterfall

== Coamo ==
- Baños de Coamo, historic warm springs
- Coamo Historic Museum
- Coamo Pueblo and its historic plaza
- Church San Blas de Illescas of Coamo
- Ermita Nuestra Señora de la Valvanera
- Las Calabazas Bridge
- Picó Hill overlook

== Comerío ==
- Comerío Pueblo and its main plaza
- El Salto Hydroelectric Dams
- La Mora Cave
- La Tiza Hill
- Media Luna Recreation Park

== Corozal ==
- Cibuco Historical Center
- Corozal Pueblo and its main plaza
- El Balalaika historic general store
- El Jíbaro Recreation Center
- El Rancho Recreation Center
- Mavilla Bridge
- San Rafael de Corozal Theater

== Culebra ==
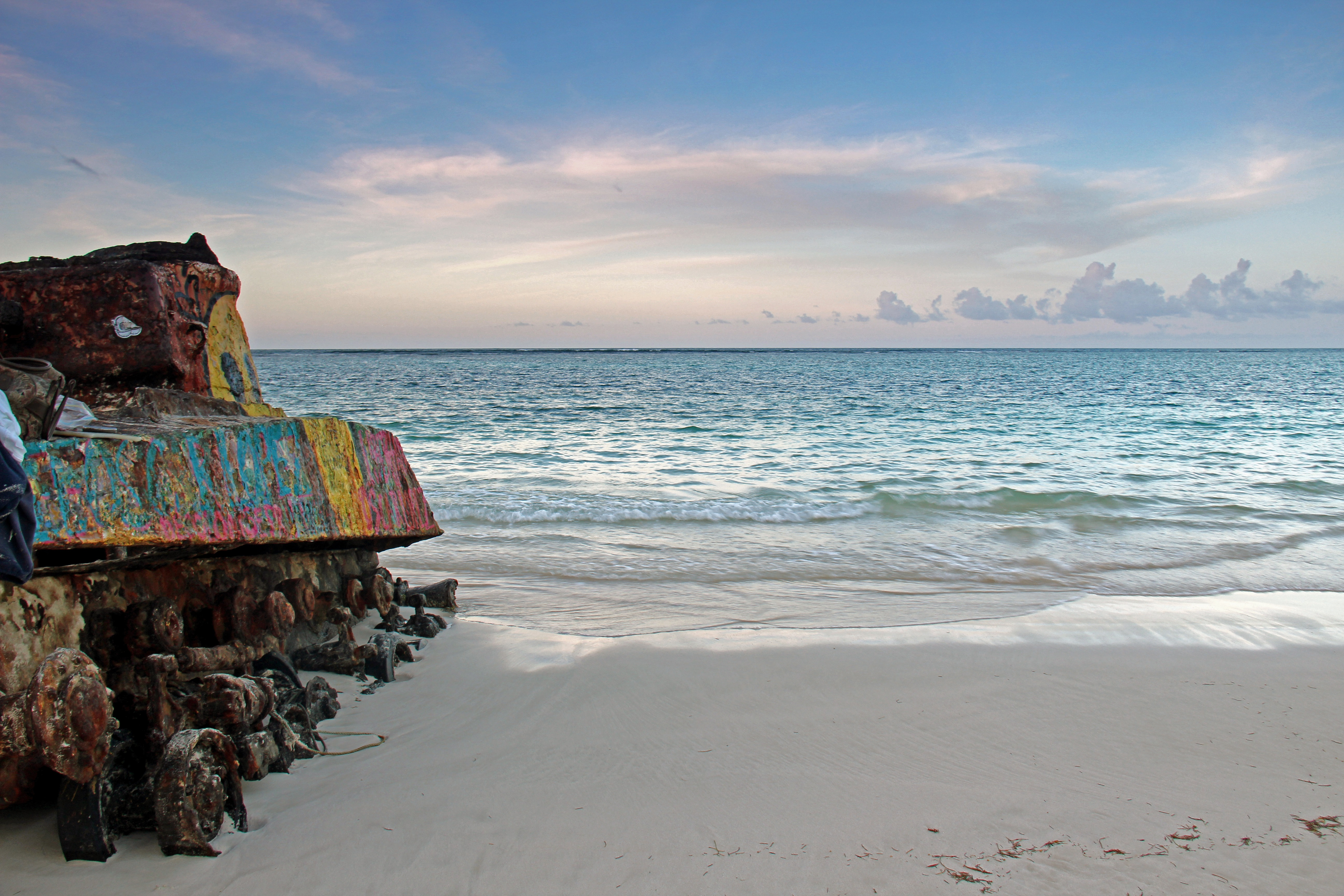
Flamenco Beach

- Brava Beach
- Cayo Luis Peña
- Culebra Bioluminiscent Bay
- Culebra National Wildlife Refuge
- Culebra Town
- Culebrita
- Ensenada Honda
- Flamenco Beach
- Larga Beach
- Las Vacas Beach
- Punta Soldado Beach
- Resaca Beach
- Tamarindo Beach
- Tortuga Beach
- Zoni Beach

== Dorado ==
- Casa del Rey Museum
- Dorado Beach Hotel and Golf Club
- Dorado Pueblo and its main plaza
- Juan Boria Theatre
- Manuel Nolo Morales Beach
- Ojo del Buey Park
- Sanctuary Christ of the Reconciliation

== Fajardo ==
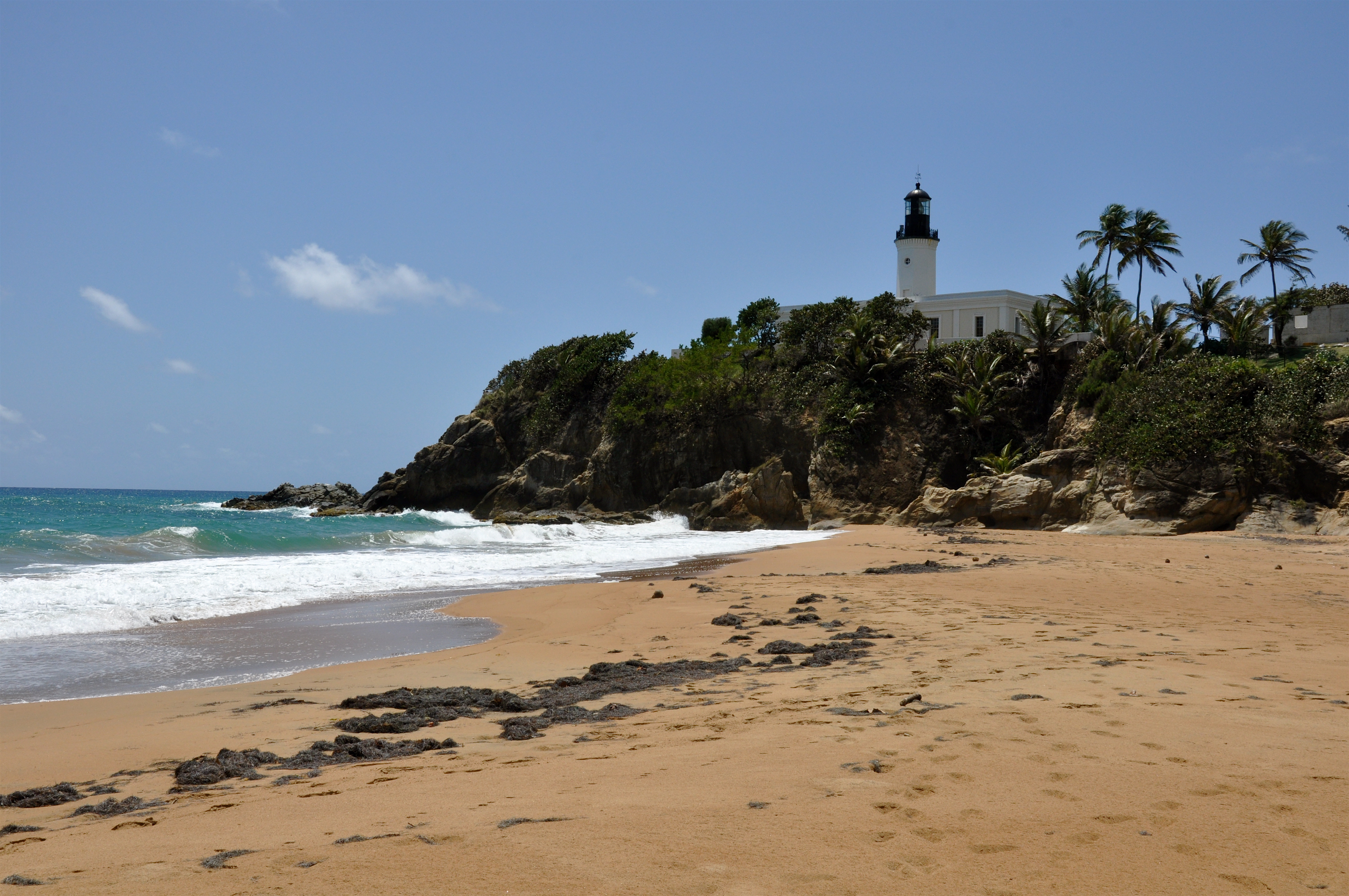
Cape San Juan Lighthouse

- Cape San Juan Lighthouse and Nature Reserve
- Cayo Diablo
- Cayo Icacos
- Cordillera Keys Barrier Reef Nature Reserve
- El Conquistador Resort
- Fajardo Pueblo and its plaza
- Hipolito Robles Sports Complex
- Isla Palomino and Palominito
- Isleta Marina
- Laguna Grande Bioluminescent Bay
- Las Croabas Natural Reserve
- Las Croabas Recreational Park
- Old Fajardo Sugar Cane Refinery
- Old US Customs House
- Port of Fajardo
- Puerto Del Rey Marina
- Seven Seas Beach

== Florida ==
- Pueblo de Florida
- Juana Gómez Cave
- Miró Cave
- Rio Encantado Caves
- Román Cave

== Guánica ==
- Cayos de Caña Gorda and Gilligan's Island
- Central Guánica Sugarcane Refinery
- Copamarina Beach Resort & Spa
- Fort Caprón ruins
- Hacienda Santa Rita
- Guánica Lighthouse
- Guánica Museum of Art and History
- Guánica Pueblo and its main plaza
- Guánica State Forest
- Malecón and Monument to the US Military Landing
- Manglillo Beach
- Punta de Brea Beach
- Punta Jorobao Beach
- Santa Beach
- Serra Beach

== Guayama ==
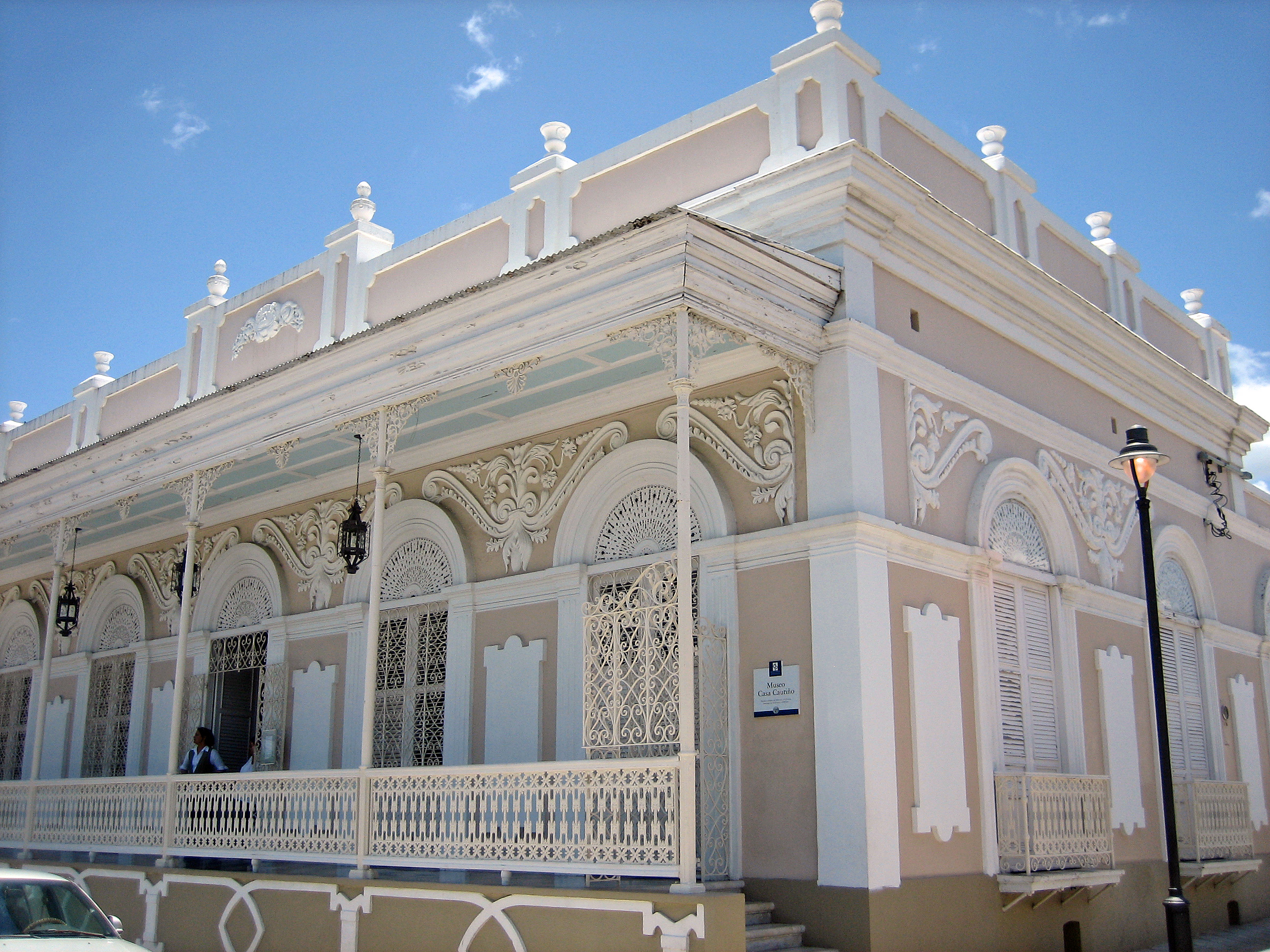
Casa Cautiño

- Aguirre State Forest
- Calimano Theater
- Carite Lake
- Carite State Forest
- Cautiño House Museum
- Central Aguirre Historic District
- El Legado Golf Resort
- Guayama Convention Center
- Guayama First Methodist Church
- Guayama Fishing Club and Marina
- Historic Guayama Pueblo
- Historic Vives Sugar Mill
- Jobos Bay National Estuarine Research Reserve
- Las Limas Natural Reserve and Butterfly House
- Melania Lake and Park
- Pozuelo Beach
- Rodeo Beach
- San Antonio de Padua Church

== Guayanilla ==
- Chorro de Oro Waterfall
- Convento Caves
- Emajagua Beach
- Guánica State Forest
- Guayanilla Pueblo and its main plaza
- Guilarte State Forest
- La Ventana Beach
- Rufina Sugarcane Refinery Ruins
- Tamarino Beach

== Guaynabo ==
- Caparra Archaeological Site
- Caribe Recreational Center
- Fort Buchanan
- Guaynabo Center for Performing Arts
- Guaynabo Museum of Sports
- Downtown Guaynabo and its main plaza
- La Marquesa Forest Park
- Mario Morales Coliseum
- Museum of Transportation of Puerto Rico
- San Patricio Plaza

== Gurabo ==
- Ana G. Méndez University Museum
- Cofresí Park
- Gurabo Pueblo and its main plaza
- Gurabo Historic Stairways
- Hacienda Mirador

== Hatillo ==
- Bayaney Historic Refinery
- Church of Our Lady of Mount Carmel
- Francisco "Pancho" Deida Méndez Coliseum
- Hacienda Santa Rosa Ruins
- Hatillo Pueblo and its main plaza
- José Antonio Monrouzeau Theater
- Juan Carmelo "Tito" Rodríguez Donate Stadium
- La Marina Beach
- Paseo del Carmen
- Plaza del Norte
- Santa Rosa Mill
- Sardinera Beach

== Hormigueros ==
- Basílica Menor de la Virgen de Monserrate
- Birán Recreational Farm
- Eureka Sugar Refinery
- Hormigueros Pueblo and its main plaza

== Humacao ==
- Buena Vista Beach
- Casa Roig Museum
- El Morrillo Beach
- Humacao Cathedral
- Humacao Pueblo and its main plaza
- Palmas del Mar Resort and Beach
- Punta Candelero Beach
- Punta Santiago Nature Reserve
- Punta Santiago village and beach
- University of Puerto Rico at Humacao Astronomical Observatory

== Isabela ==
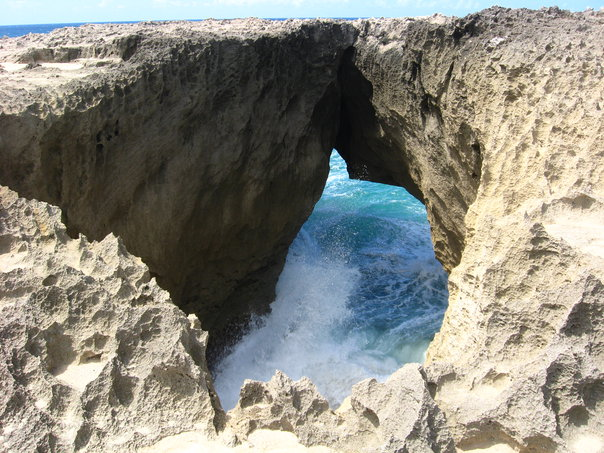
Pozo de Jacinto

- El Pozo Brujo
- Guajataca State Forest
- Guajataca Tunnel and beach
- Hermitage of San Antonio de Padua de la Tuna
- Isabela Museum of Photography
- Isabela Pueblo and its main plaza
- Jobos Beach
- La Cara del Indio
- La Pocita de las Golondrinas Beach
- La Princesa Beach and Blow Hole
- Las Golondrinas Beach
- Middles Beach
- Montones Beach
- Pozo de Jacinto
- Punta Sandina Tidal Pools
- San Antonio de la Tuna Museum
- Shacks Beach
- Shore Island Beach

== Jayuya ==
- Cerro de Punta
- Cerro Rosa
- Hacienda San Pedro
- Jayuya Pueblo and its main plaza
- Los Tres Picachos
- Los Tres Picachos State Forest
- Monte Jayuya
- Nemesio Canales House and El Cemí Museum
- Piedra Escrita petroglyphs and natural pool
- Toro Negro State Forest

== Juana Díaz ==
- Juana Díaz Pueblo and its main plaza
- Lucero Cave
- Monument and Museum to the Juana Díaz Three Wise Kings

== Juncos ==
- El Tenedor Restaurant
- Juncos Pueblo and its main plaza
- Juncos Sugarcane Mill Ruins
- Junqueño Theater
- The Old Tobacco Farm

== Lajas ==
- Boquerón State Forest
- Caracoles Beach
- Isla Magueyes
- Isla Mata la Gata
- La Parguera
- Laguna Cartagena National Wildlife Refuge
- Lajas Pueblo and its main plaza
- Old Lajas Silver Mines
- Puerto Rico Alien Route
- Rosada Beach

== Lares ==
- Castañer Pueblo and its former city hall
- El Jíbaro Park
- Hacienda Collazo
- Hacienda El Porvenir
- Hacienda Lealtad
- Lares Ice Cream Parlor
- Lares Pueblo and its main plaza
- Mariana Bracetti Overlook

== Las Marías ==
- Barrietos Cave
- Las Marías Pueblo and its main plaza
- Paradise Camping Coffee Farm

== Las Piedras ==
- Cueva del Indio Archaeological Site
- Francisco Negrón Park
- El Toro Wilderness
- Las Piedras Historic Museum
- Las Piedras Pueblo and its main plaza

== Loíza ==
- Aviones Beach
- Church of the Holy Spirit and San Patricio
- Julia de Burgos Park
- Loíza Pueblo and its main plaza
- Piñones village and food kiosks
- Piñones State Forest
- Vacía Talega Beach

== Luquillo ==
- El Yunque National Forest
- Fortuna Beach
- La Bandera Beach
- La Pared Beach
- Las Pailas Beach
- Luquillo Beach and its food kiosks
- Luquillo Pueblo and its main plaza
- Mameyes Beach
- Oceanview Boulevard and boardwalk

== Manatí ==
- Hacienda La Esperanza
- Hyatt Place Hotel and Casino
- La Esperanza Beach
- Las Golondrinas Beach
- Los Tubos Beach
- Manatí Pueblo and its main plaza
- Mar Chiquita Beach
- New Manati Arena and Baseball Stadium
- Poza de las Mujeres

== Maricao ==
- Bambúa Recreational Center
- Curet Falls
- Hacienda Delicias
- Hacienda Juanita
- Maricao Fish Hatchery
- Maricao Pueblo and its main plaza
- Maricao State Forest

== Maunabo ==
- Los Bohios Beach
- Los Pinos Beach
- Maunabo Pueblo and its main plaza
- Punta Tuna Beach
- Punta Tuna Lighthouse

== Mayagüez ==
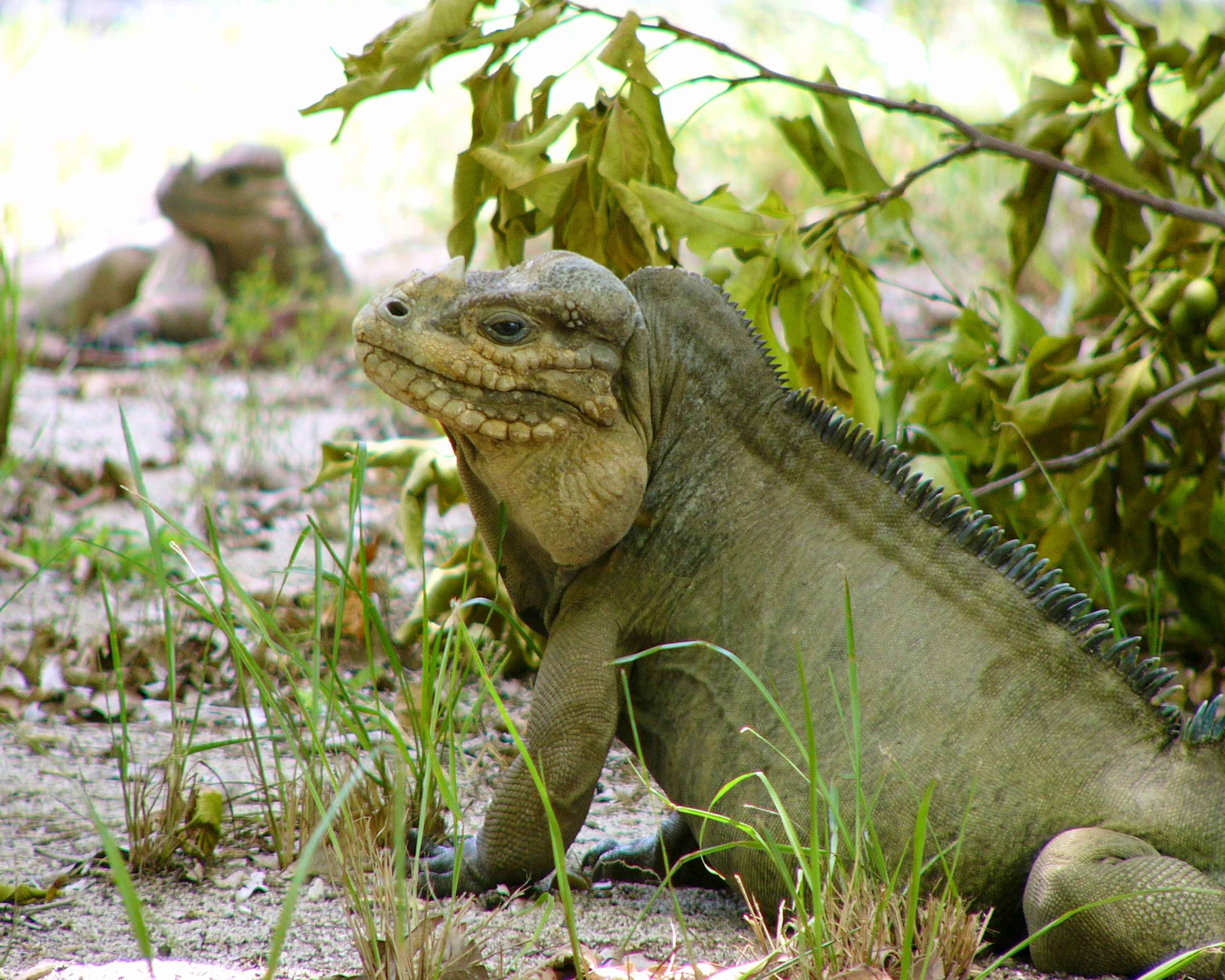
Mona ground iguana

- Asilo de Pobres Building
- Baudilio Vega Berrios Cultural Center
- Boquilla Creek Wildlife Reserve
- India Beer Brewery
- Desecheo National Wildlife Refuge
- Downtown Mayagüez and historic site
- Dr. Juan A. Rivero Zoo
- E. Franco & Co. Bakery
- Edificio José de Diego
- Gómez Residence
- Mayagüez City Hall
- Mayagüez Resort & Casino
- Papalaya
- Parque del Litoral
- Plaza Colón
- Rex Cream's Ice Cream
- RUM Planetarium
- Teatro Yagüez
- University of Puerto Rico at Mayagüez
- U.S. Post Office and Courthouse

== Moca ==
- Enrique Laguerre House
- Moca Pueblo and its main plaza
- Mundillo Museum
- Palacete Los Moreau

== Morovis ==
- Las Cabachuelas Cave
- La Patria Bakery
- Morovis National Cemetery
- Morovis Pueblo and its main plaza

== Naguabo ==
- Castillo Villa del Mar
- Cayo Algodones
- Charco El Hippie
- El Yunque National Forest
- Húcares Waterfront and seafood restaurants
- Naguabo Beach
- Naguabo Pueblo and its main plaza
- Punta Lima Beach
- Ramón Rivero "Diplo" Monument

== Naranjito ==
- Jesús Izcoa Moure Bridge
- La Plata Lake
- Naranjito Pueblo and its main plaza

== Orocovis ==
- Cerro La Guaira Park
- Las Cabañas restaurants
- Matrullas Lake
- Orocovis Pueblo and its main plaza
- Toro Negro Rain Forest
- Toro Verde Nature Adventure Park
- Villalba-Orocovis Overlook

== Patillas ==
- Charco Azul in Carite State Forest
- Escondida Beach
- Guardarraya Beach
- Patillas Lake
- Patillas Pueblo and its main plaza
- Villa Pesquera Beach

== Peñuelas ==
- Guilarte State Forest
- La Soplaera falls and natural pool
- Peñuelas Museum of Art and History
- Peñuelas Pueblo and its main plaza

== Ponce ==
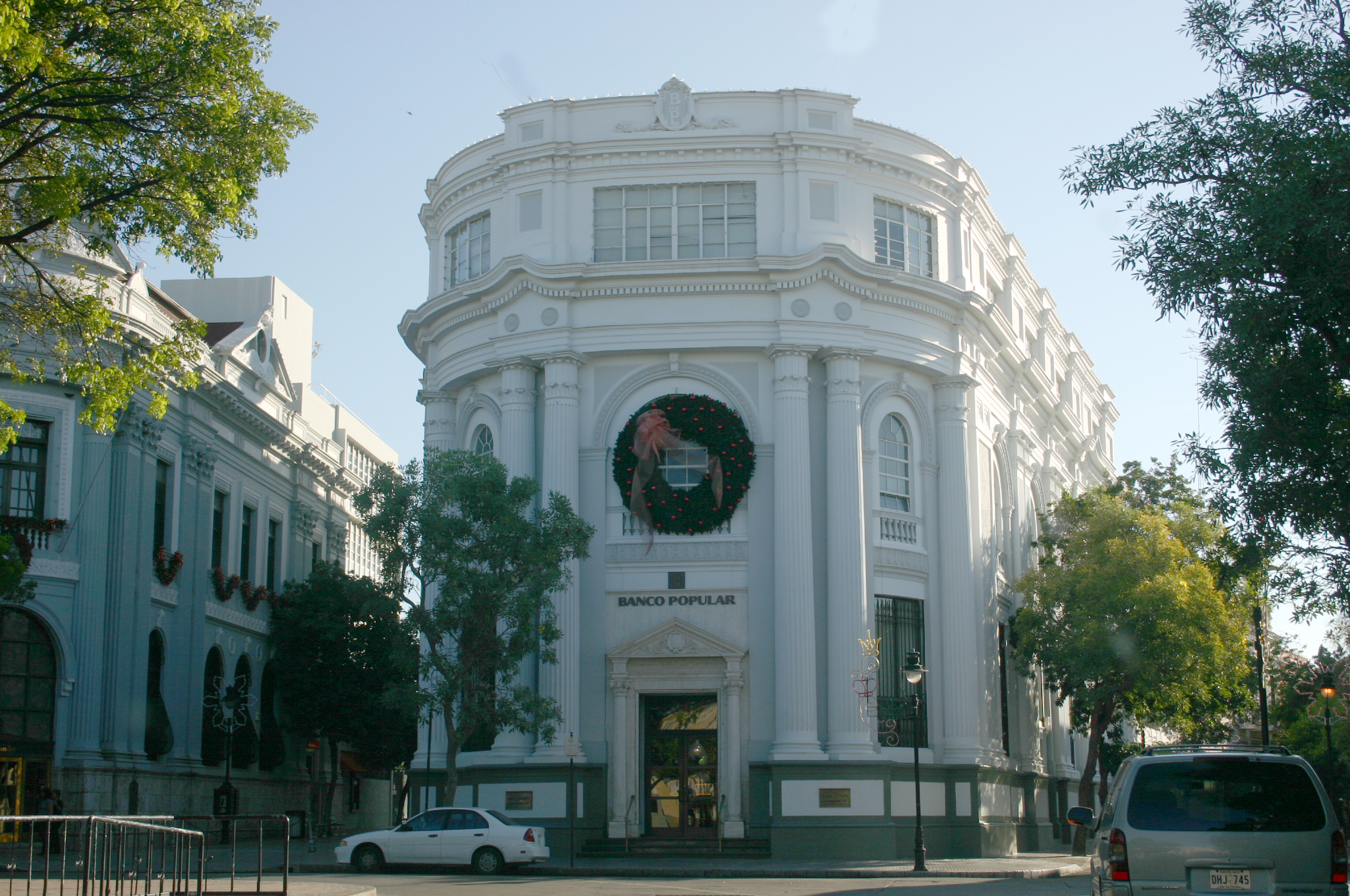
Ponce Historic Zone

=== Banks ===
- Banco de Ponce
- Banco Crédito y Ahorro Ponceño

=== Beaches ===
- Caja de Muertos
- El Tuque
- La Guancha

=== Cemeteries ===
- Cementerio Católico San Vicente de Paul
- Panteón Nacional Román Baldorioty de Castro
- Cementerio Civil de Ponce

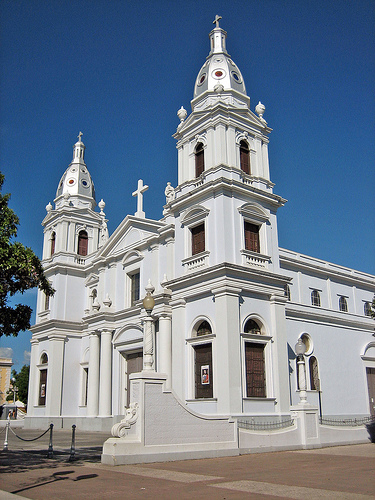
Ponce Cathedral

=== Churches ===
- Catedral de Nuestra Señora de Guadalupe
- Iglesia de la Santísima Trinidad
- Iglesia Metodista Unida de la Playa de Ponce
- Primera Iglesia Metodista Unida de Ponce

=== Forests ===
- Cerrillos State Forest
- Toro Negro State Forest

=== Historic homes ===
- Calle 25 de Enero
- Casa Fernando Luis Toro
- Casa Font-Ubides
- Casa Oppenheimer
- Casa Paoli
- Casa Salazar-Candal
- Casa Serralles
- Casa Rosita Serrallés
- Casa Wiechers-Villaronga
- Castillo Serrallés
- Residencia Armstrong-Poventud
- Residencia Rosaly-Batiz
- Residencia Subirá

=== Hotels ===
- Hotel Fox Delicias
- Hotel Ponce Intercontinental
- Hotel Melia
- Hotel Ponce Ramada

=== Industries and companies ===
- Bolera Caribe
- Café Rico
- Destilería Serrallés
- Industrias Vassallo
- King's Cream
- Ponce Cement, Inc.
- Puerto Rico Iron Works
- Rovira Biscuits Corporation

=== Islands ===
- Caja de Muertos
- Isla Cardona
- Isla de Gatas
- Isla de Jueyes
- Isla de Ratones
- Isla del Frío
- Morrillito

=== Lighthouses ===
- Faro de la Isla de Caja de Muertos
- Faro del Puerto de Ponce

=== Marinas ===
- Club Nautico de Ponce
- Villa Pesquera

=== Monuments ===
- Monumento a la abolición de la exclavitud
- Monumento a los heroes de El Polvorín (obelisco)
- Monumento a los heroes de El Polvorín (tumba)

=== Museums ===
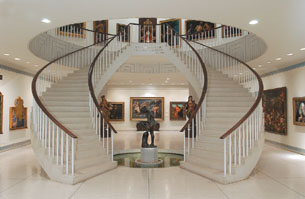
Ponce Museum of Art

- Centro Ceremonial Indígena de Tibes
- Hacienda Buena Vista
- Museo Castillo Serrallés
- Museo de Arte de Ponce
- Museo de la Arquitectura Ponceña
- Museo de la Historia de Ponce
- Museo de la Masacre de Ponce
- Museo de la Música Puertorriqueña
- Museo del Autonomismo Puertorriqueño
- Museo Francisco "Pancho" Coimbre
- Parque de Bombas

=== Parks ===
- Parque de la Abolición
- Parque de la Ceiba
- Parque del Retiro
- Parque del Tricentenario
- Parque Ecológico Urbano
- Parque Familiar Julio Enrique Monagas
- Parque Lineal Veredas del Labrador
- Parque Luis A. Wito Morales
- Parque Pedro Albizu Campos
- Parque Urbano Dora Colón Clavell
- Plaza Degetau
- Plaza Las Delicias
- Plaza Muñoz Rivera

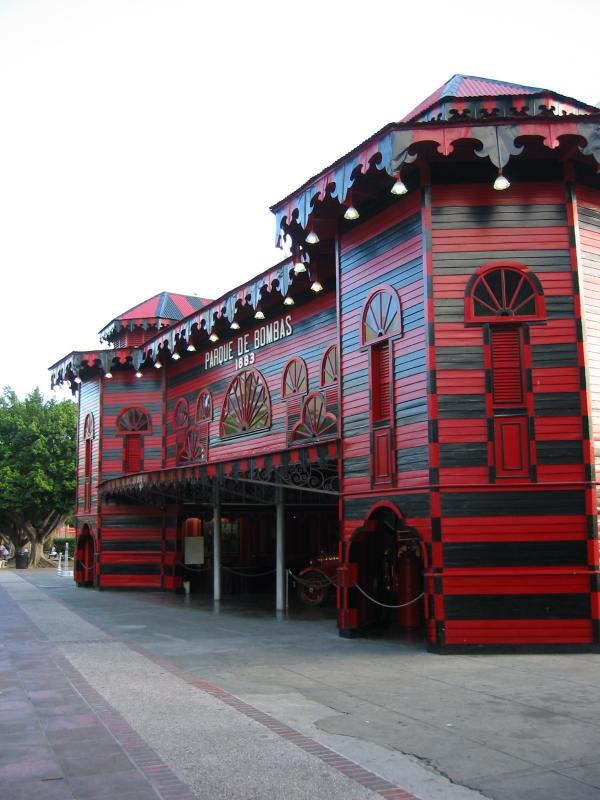
Parque de Bombas

=== Schools and colleges ===
- Colegio Ponceño
- Colegio San Conrado
- Ponce High School
- Ponce School of Medicine
- Pontificia Universidad Católica de Puerto Rico
- Universidad de Puerto Rico en Ponce
- Universidad Interamericana en Ponce

=== Sports venues ===
- Auditorio Juan Pachín Vicéns
- Campo Atlético Charles H. Terry
- Ciudad Deportiva Millito Navarro
- Club Náutico de Ponce
- Estadio Francisco Montaner

=== Shopping plazas ===
- Fox Delicias Mall
- Plaza del Mercado de Ponce
- Plaza del Caribe
- Plaza Juan Ponce de León
- Centro del Sur Mall

=== Theaters ===
- Teatro Fox Delicias
- Teatro La Perla

=== Visitor attractions ===
- Antiguo Casino de Ponce
- Antiguo Cuartel Militar Español de Ponce
- Antiguo Hospital Militar Español de Ponce
- Biblioteca Municipal de Ponce
- Centro Cultural de Ponce Carmen Solá de Pereira
- Centro de Convenciones de Ponce
- Complejo Recreativo y Cultural La Guancha
- Cruceta del Vigía
- Letras de Ponce
- Luis A. Ferré United States Courthouse and Post Office Building
- Paseo Atocha
- Paseo Tablado La Guancha
- Ponce City Hall
- Ponce YMCA Building
- United States Customs House
- Zona Historica de Ponce

== Quebradillas ==
- Blanco Historic Bridge
- Guajataca Beach and tunnel
- Guajataca Lake
- Guajataca State Forest
- Liberty Theater
- Puerto Hermina Beach and ruins
- Quebradillas Pueblo and its main plaza

== Rincón ==
- Córcega Beach
- Domes Beach
- Marias Beach
- Pools Beach
- Punta Higuero Lighthouse
- Rincón Pueblo and its main plaza
- Rincón Beach
- Sandy Beach
- Steps Beach
- Tres Palmas Beach
- whale watching viewpoints

== Río Grande ==
- Coco Beach
- El Yunque National Forest
- Grand Rio Mar Resort and Beach
- Hyatt Regency Grand Reserve
- Las Picúas
- Río Grande Pueblo and its main plaza
- St. Regis Bahía Beach Resort & Golf Club

== Sabana Grande ==
- Hacienda San Francisco
- Sabana Grande Masonic Cemetery
- Sabana Grande Pueblo and its main plaza
- Sanctuary of the Virgin of the Rosary of the Well
- Susúa State Forest

== Salinas ==
- Albergue Olímpico
- Campamento Santiago
- Central Aguirre Historic District
- Cerro Las Tetas
- Salinas Beach and fishing village
- Salinas Pueblo and its main plaza

== San Germán ==
- Church of San Germán de Auxerre
- Interamerican University Historic Campus
- La Botica Pharmacy Museum
- Lola Rodríguez de Tió Museum
- Porta Coeli Church
- Ramírez de Arrellano y Rossell Museum
- San Germán Historic District
- San Germán Underground

== San Juan ==
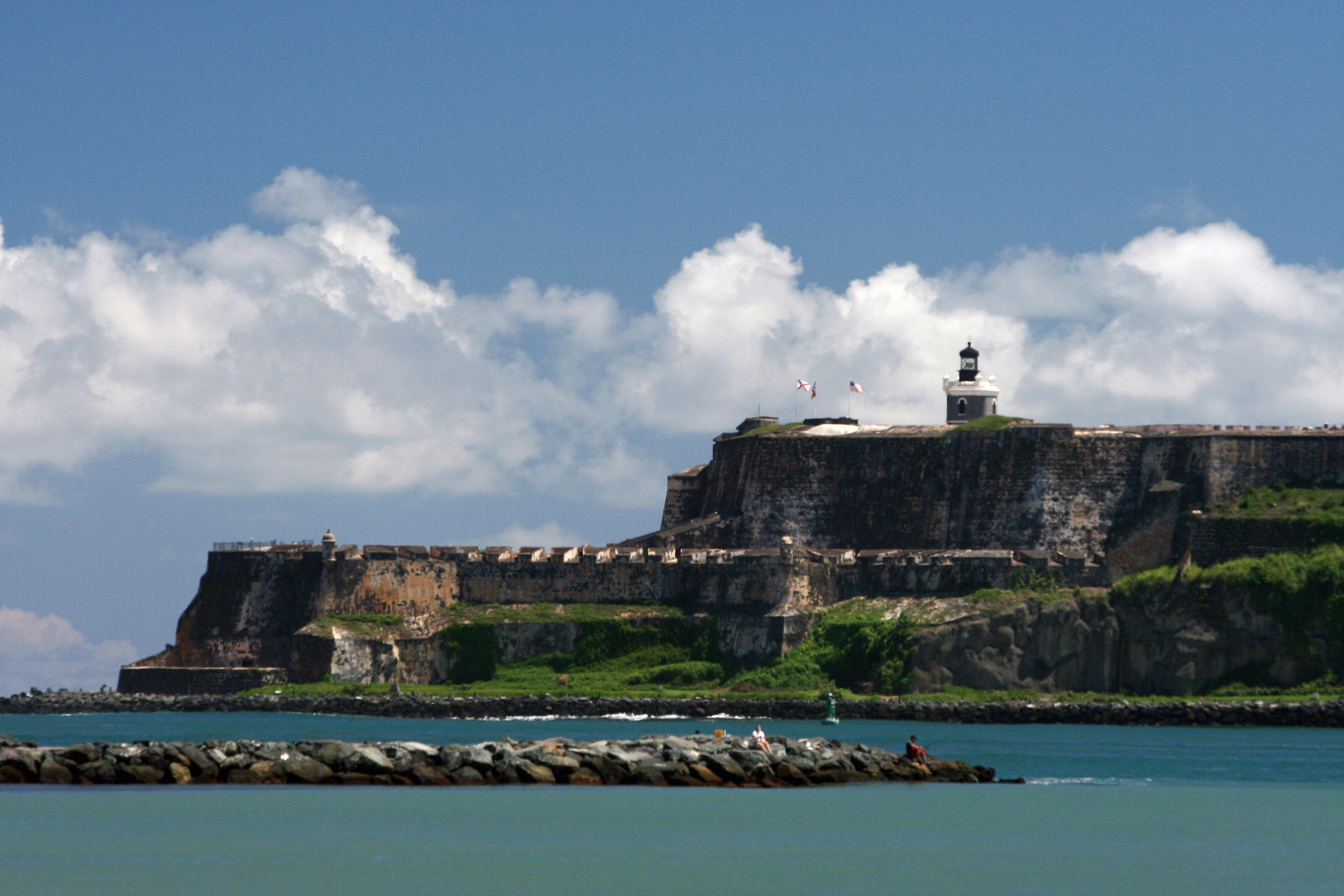
El Morro

=== Beaches ===
- Condado Beach
- El Escambrón Beach
- Ocean Park Beach
- Playita del Condado

=== Bridges ===
- Dos Hermanos Bridge
- General Norzagaray Bridge
- Martín Peña Bridge
- Río Piedras Bridge
- San Antonio Railroad Bridge
- Teodoro Moscoso Bridge

=== Castles and fortresses ===
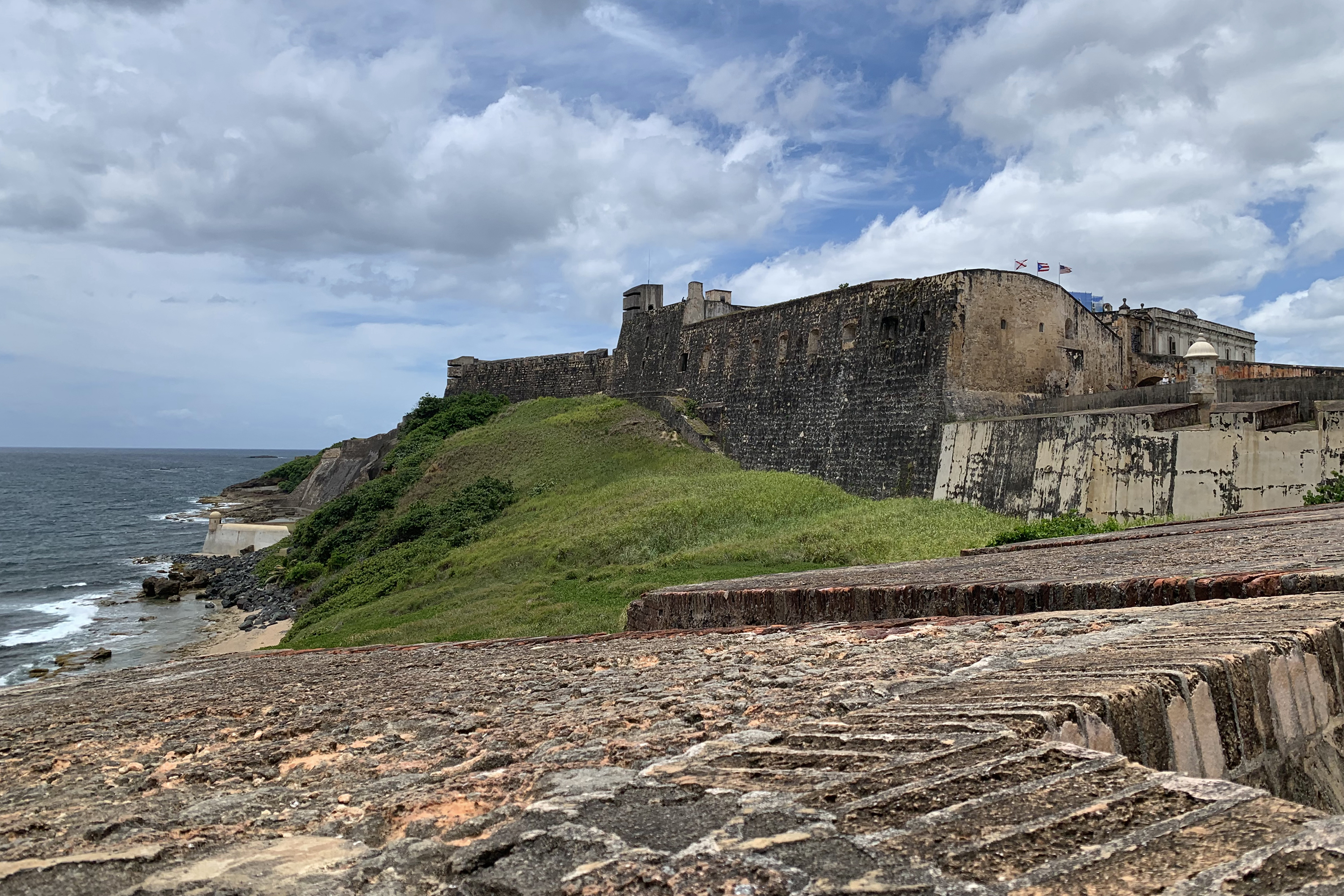
Castillo San Cristobal

- Castillo San Cristóbal
- Castillo San Felipe del Morro
- City Walls of San Juan
- Fortín de San Gerónimo
- Fortín San Antonio
- La Fortaleza
- Línea Avanzada Fortress
- Polvorín de Miraflores

=== Cemeteries ===
- Santa María Magdalena de Pazzis Cemetery

=== Churches ===
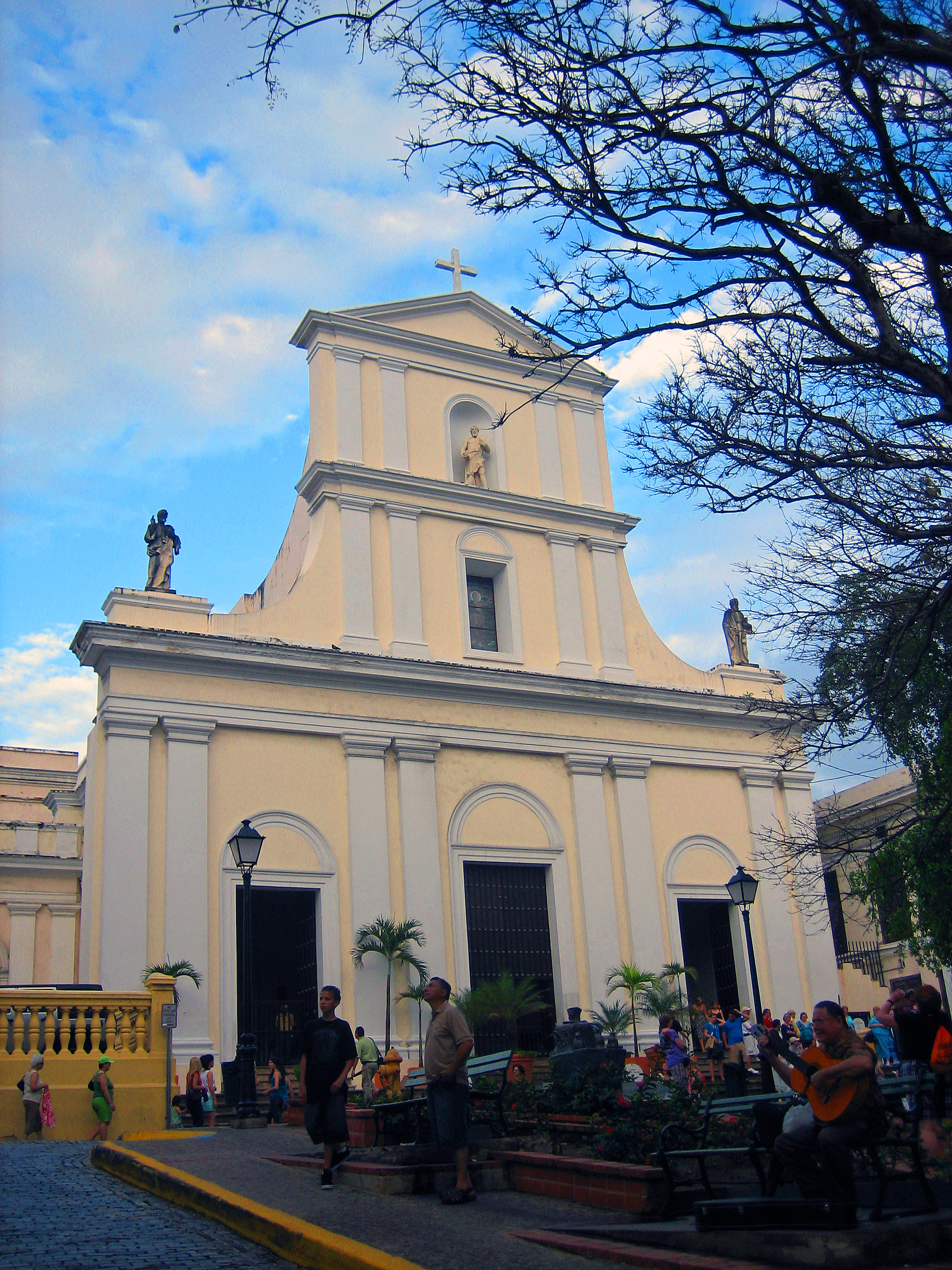
San Juan Cathedral

- Capilla del Cristo
- Church and Convent of San Agustín
- Church of San Mateo de Cangrejos of Santurce
- Church of San Vicente de Paul
- Church of Saint Francis of Assisi, San Juan
- Episcopal Cathedral of St. John the Baptist
- Nuestra Señora de Lourdes Chapel
- Shaare Tzadik Synagogue
- Sagrado Corazon Church
- San José Church
- San Juan Cathedral
- San Juan Puerto Rico Temple
- Santa Ana Church
- Stella-Maris Catholic Church
- Temple Beth Shalom

=== Government buildings ===
- Capitol of Puerto Rico
- Clemente Ruiz Nazario United States Courthouse
- Jose V. Toledo Federal Building and United States Courthouse
- San Juan City Hall
- Supreme Court Building
- U.S. Customs House

=== Historic districts ===
- La Perla
- La Placita de Santurce
- Miramar
- Old San Juan
- Puerta de Tierra Historic District
- Río Piedras Pueblo
- San Juan Waterworks
- Santurce Historic District

=== Hotels ===
- Caribe Hilton Hotel
- Condado Vanderbilt Hotel
- Hotel El Convento
- La Concha Renaissance San Juan Resort
- Normandie Hotel
- San Juan Marriott Resort & Stellaris Casino

=== Houses ===
- Casa de España
- Casa Dra. Concha Melendez Ramirez
- Casa Vigil
- Edificio Aboy
- Edificio Comunidad de Orgullo Gay de Puerto Rico
- Edificio del Valle
- Edificio Patio Español
- Edificio Victory Garden
- El Falansterio de Puerta de Tierra
- Figueroa Apartments Building
- Henry Klumb House
- House at 659 Concordia Street
- House at 659 La Paz Street
- House at 663 La Paz Street
- House at 665 McKinley Street
- La Giralda
- Miami Building
- Residencia Aboy-Lompré
- Residencia Luis Muñoz Marín
- Villa Victoria

=== Libraries ===
- Archivo General de Puerto Rico
- Biblioteca Carnegie
- Institute of Puerto Rican Culture
- José M. Lázaro Library
- Puerto Rico National Library

=== Lighthouses ===
- El Morro Lighthouse

=== Monuments and memorials ===
- El Monumento de la Recordación

=== Museums ===
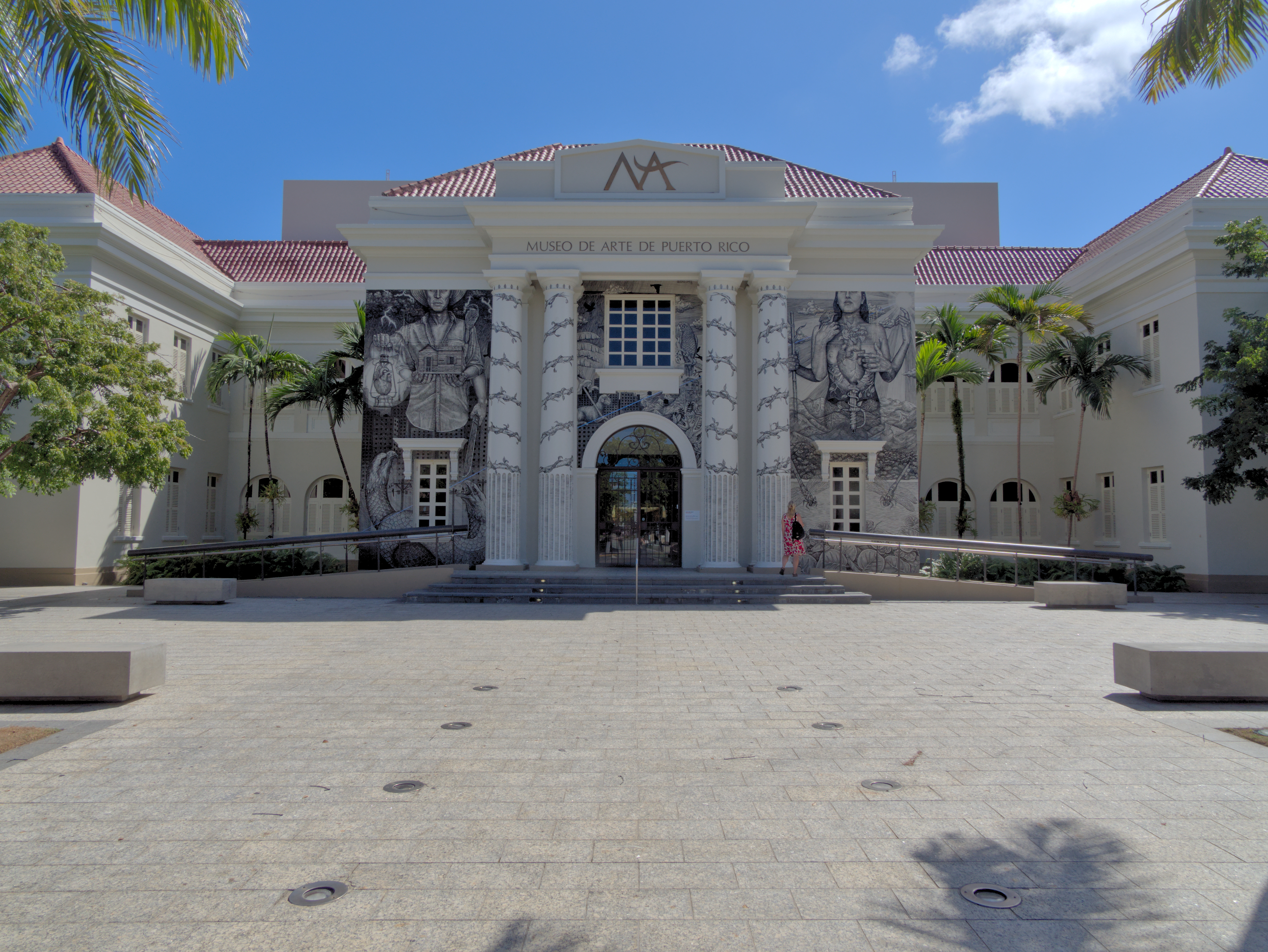
Museum of Art of Puerto Rico

- Ateneo Puertorriqueño
- Ballajá Barracks
- Casa Blanca
- Casa Rosa
- Galería Casa Jefferson
- Galería Nacional
- Museo de Vida Silvestre
- Museum of Art of Puerto Rico
- Pablo Casals Museum
- Puerto Rico Museum of Contemporary Art
- San Juan Children's Museum
- San Juan Museum of Books
- University of Puerto Rico Museum of Art, History, and Anthropology

=== Music and event venues ===
- Coca-Cola Music Hall
- Conservatory of Music of Puerto Rico
- José Miguel Agrelot Coliseum
- La Ventana al Mar
- Luis A. Ferré Performing Arts Center
- Puerto Rico Convention Center
- Tito Puente Amphitheatre

=== Parks and gardens ===
- Condado Lagoon Park
- Luis Muñoz Marín Park
- Nuevo Milenio State Forest
- San Patricio State Forest
- San Juan Botanical Garden

=== Plazas and squares ===
- La Ventana al Mar
- Luis Muñoz Rivera Park
- Parque de las Palomas
- Paseo de La Princesa
- Plaza Antonia Quiñones
- Plaza Colón
- Plaza de Armas
- Plaza de la Catedral
- Plaza de San José
- Plaza del Quinto Centenario
- Plazuela de la Rogativa

=== Restaurants ===
- La Bombonera
- La Mallorquina
- Loverbar

=== Schools and universities ===
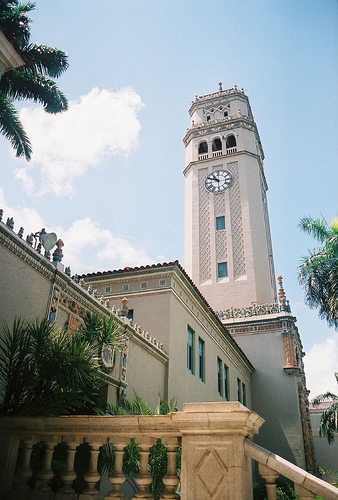
UPR Tower

- Academia del Perpetuo Socorro
- Academia Interamericana Metro
- Academia Maria Reina
- Academia San Jorge
- Albizu University
- Center for Advanced Studies on Puerto Rico and the Caribbean
- Central High School
- Colegio de Arquitectos
- Colegio de las Madres del Sagrado Corazón
- Conservatory of Music of Puerto Rico
- Escuela Brambaugh
- Escuela Graduado José Celso Barbosa
- Escuela de Artes Plásticas y Diseño de Puerto Rico
- Mizpa Pentecostal University
- Polytechnic University of Puerto Rico
- Rafael Cordero Graded School
- Saint John's School
- School of Tropical Medicine
- Universidad del Sagrado Corazón
- University Gardens High School
- University High School
- University of Puerto Rico, Medical Sciences Campus
- University of Puerto Rico, Río Piedras Campus
- University of Puerto Rico School of Medicine

=== Shopping ===
- La Placita de Santurce
- Montehiedra Outlets
- Paseo de Diego
- Plaza Las Américas
- The Mall of San Juan
- T-Mobile District

=== Sports ===
- Hiram Bithorn Stadium
- José Miguel Agrelot Coliseum
- Old Country Club Stadium
- Roberto Clemente Coliseum
- San Juan Natatorium
- Sixto Escobar Stadium

=== Theaters ===
- Ambassador Theater
- Luis A. Ferré Performing Arts Center
- Teatro Tapia
- T-Mobile District

== San Lorenzo ==
- Carite State Forest
- Montaña Santa Sanctuary
- Priscilla Flores Theater
- San Lorenzo Pueblo and its main plaza

== San Sebastián ==
- Centro Agropecuario and farmers' market
- Church of St. Sebastian Martyr
- Doña Bisa House Museum
- Gozalandia Waterfalls
- Guajataca Lake
- Guajataka Scout Reservation
- Hacienda El Jibarito
- Hacienda La Fe
- Luis Aymat Cardona Coliseum
- San Sebastián Pueblo and its main plaza
- Veredas Sports Complex

== Santa Isabel ==
- Aguirre State Forest
- Cortada Sugarcane Refinery Ruins
- El Malecón
- Hacienda Alomar Ruins
- Jauca Beach
- Racehorse stud farms
- Santa Isabel Pueblo and its main plaza

== Toa Alta ==
- Old Bala de Cañón Tree
- Toa Alta Pueblo and its main plaza
- Villa Tropical Recreation Center

== Toa Baja ==
- Constancia Sugarcane Refinery ruins
- San Juan de la Cruz Fortress
- Hacienda Santa Elena
- Isla de Cabras
- Palo Seco Thermoelectrical Power Station
- Punta Salinas Beach
- Toa Baja Pueblo and its main plaza

== Trujillo Alto ==
- Carraízo Dam
- Loíza Lake
- Our Lady of Lourdes Shrine
- Trujillo Alto Pueblo and its main plaza

== Utuado ==
- Caguana Indigenous Ceremonial Center
- Caonillas Lake
- Cerro Morales
- Church San Miguel Arcángel of Utuado
- Dos Bocas Dam
- El Saltillo Waterfall
- Dos Bocas Lake
- Río Abajo State Forest
- Utuado Pueblo and its main plaza

== Vega Alta ==
- La Placita Güisín and Lin-Manuel Miranda Museum
- Vega Alta Pueblo and its main plaza
- Vega State Forest

== Vega Baja ==
- Casa Alonso Museum
- El Trece Recreational Area
- Mar Bella Beach
- Melao Melao Artisan Center
- Melao Melao Sports Hall of Fame
- Tortuguero Lagoon and Nature Reserve
- Vega Baja House of Culture and Tourism
- Vega Baja Pueblo and its main plaza

== Vieques ==
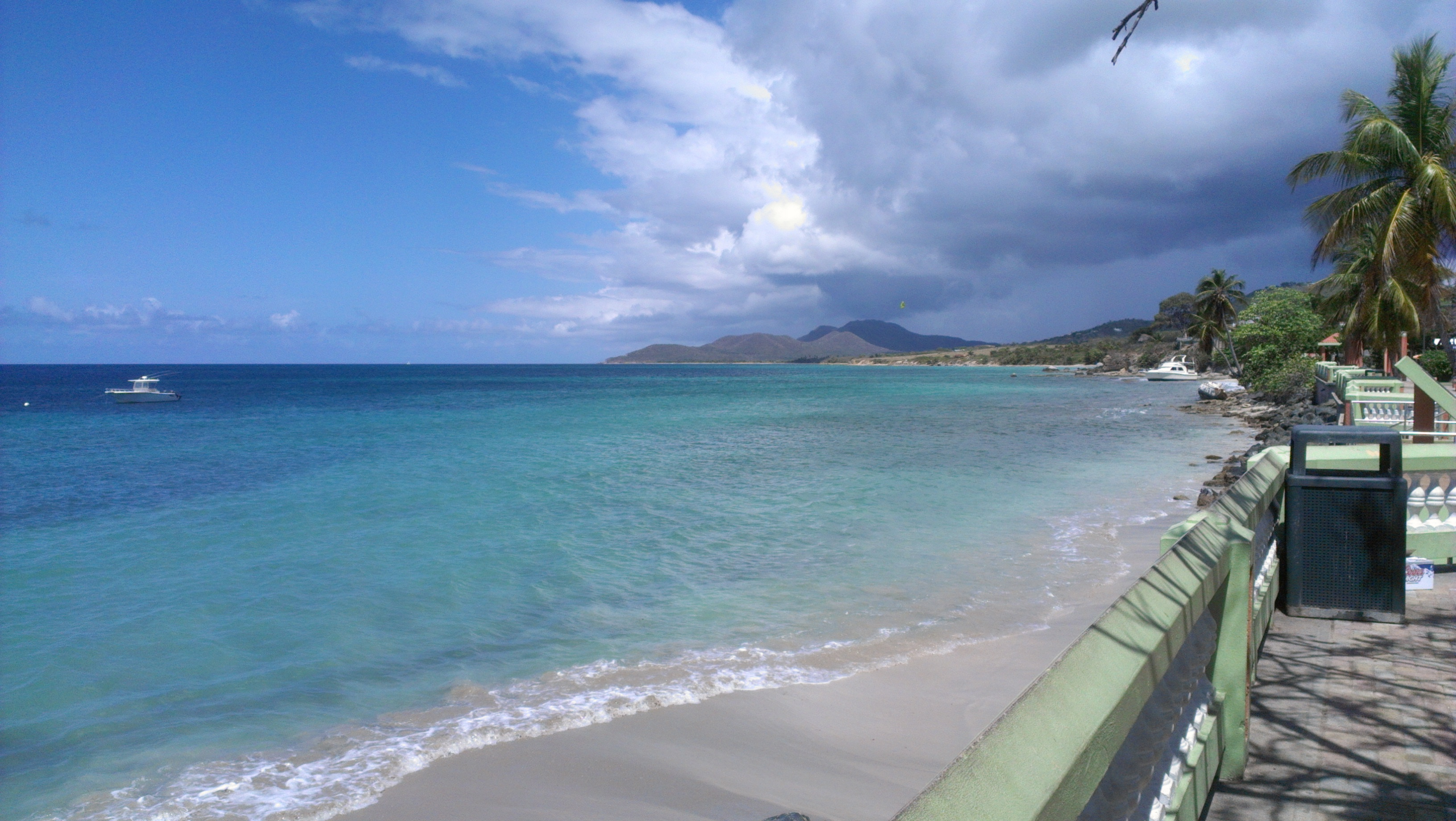
La Esperanza Beach

- Black Sand Beach
- Caracas Beach
- Conde de Mirasol Fort
- Esperanza Beach
- Hacienda Playa Grande
- Isabel II Town and its main plaza
- La Chiva Beach
- Pata Prieta Beach
- Plata Beach
- Puerto Ferro Archaeological Site
- Punta Arenas Beach
- Punta Mulas Lighthouse
- Sun Bay Beach
- Underground U.S. Navy Bunkers
- Vieques Bioluminiscent Bay
- Vieques National Wildlife Refuge
- Wreckage of the World War II Navy Destroyer USS Killen (DD-593)

== Villalba ==
- Cerro Maravilla
- Doña Juana Falls
- Guayabal Lake
- Orocovis-Villalba Overlook
- Toa Vaca Lake
- Toro Negro State Forest
- Villalba Pueblo and its main plaza

== Yabucoa ==
- Dead Dog Beach
- El Cocal Beach
- Guayanés Beach and pier
- Hacienda Santa Lucía Ruins
- Kyle Rembis Beach
- Roig Refinery Ruins
- Yabucoa Pueblo and its main plaza

== Yauco ==
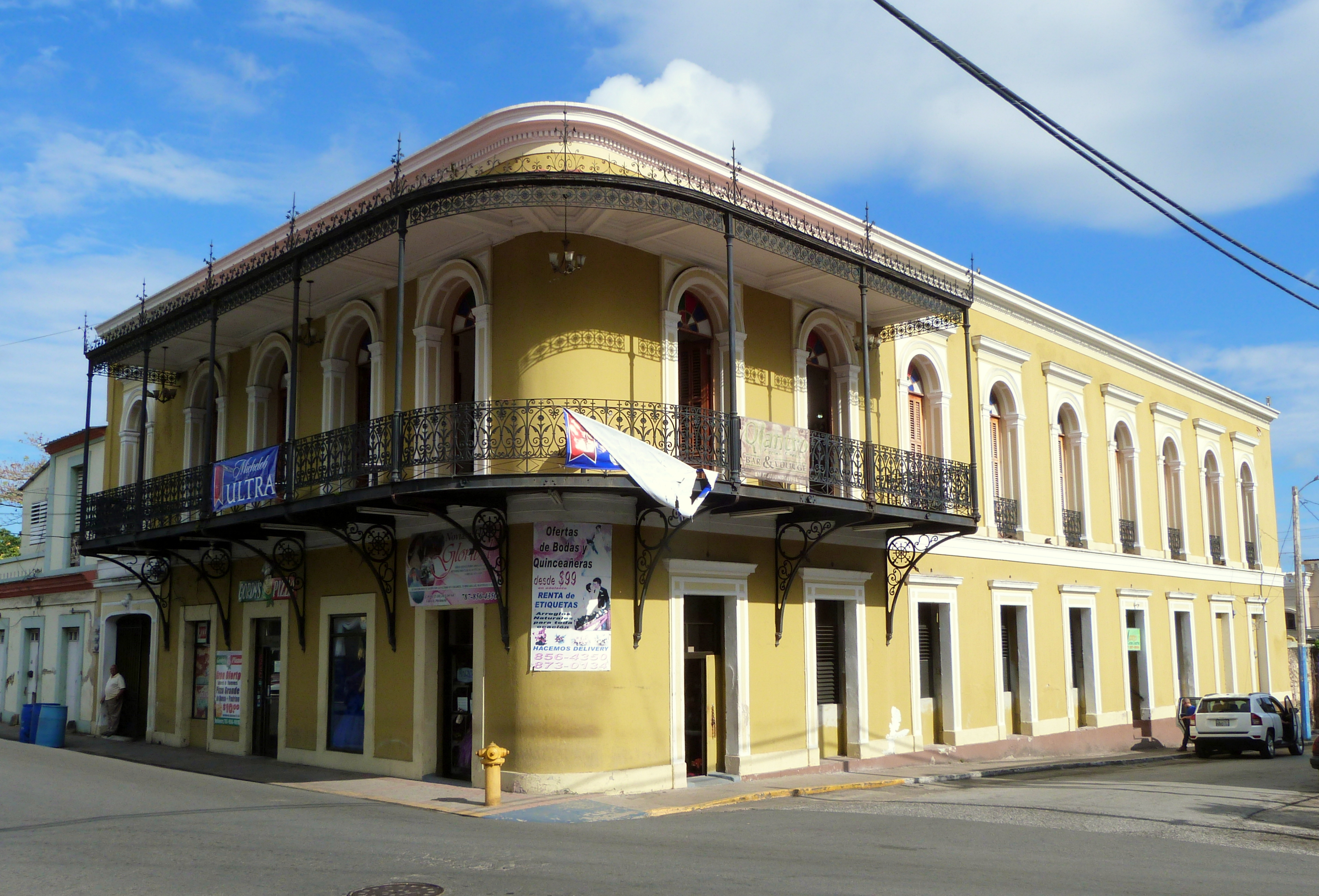
Historic Cesari House

- Atolladora Beach
- Césari Mansion
- Chalet Amill
- Cuesta Los Judios
- Curet Hill
- Filardi House
- Franceschi Antongiorgi House
- Guilarte State Forest
- Hacienda Mireia
- Hijos de la Luz Historic Masonic Lodge
- Lake Luchetti and Wildlife Refuge
- Monte Membrillo
- Pico Rodadero
- Susúa State Forest
- Tozza Castle
- Volkyland Museum
- Yauco Pueblo and its main plaza
- Yaucromatic painted houses and mural

== See also ==
- National Register of Historic Places listings in Puerto Rico
- List of lists of buildings and structures in Puerto Rico
- Tourism in Puerto Rico
