= La Bombonera (disambiguation) =

La Bombonera most commonly refers to Estadio Alberto J. Armando, home stadium of Boca Juniors in Argentina. Other stadiums or articles referred to as La Bombonera include:

- Estadio La Bombonera (Montevideo), home stadium of Basáñez in Uruguay
- Ramón Sánchez Pizjuán Stadium, home stadium of Sevilla F.C. in Spain, colloquially called La Bombonera de Nervión
- La Bombonera (San Juan), restaurant founded in 1902 in San Juan, Puerto Rico
- Nemesio Diez Stadium, also known as "La Bombonera", in Toluca, Mexico
