= Aguadilla Ice Skating Arena =

Multi-use facility in Aguadilla, Puerto Rico

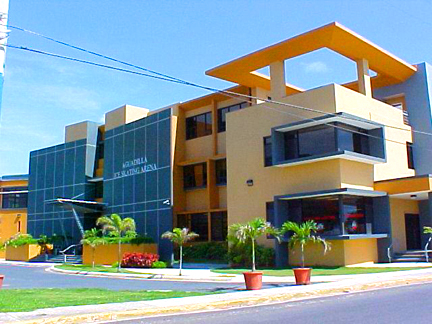
- Interactive map of the Aguadilla Ice Skating Arena area

General information
- Location: Aguadilla, Puerto Rico
- Coordinates: 18°25′6″N 67°9′23″W
- Opening: 2005
- Owner: City of Aguadilla

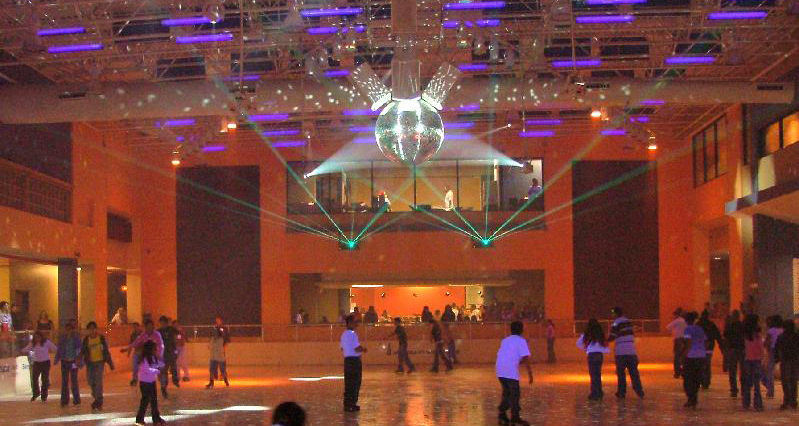
At night, AISA is transformed into an ice discotheque.

Aguadilla Ice Skating Arena, A.I.S.A., or now known as the Aguadilla Shark Roller Rink is a multi-use facility with a roller rink in Aguadilla, Puerto Rico. The arena was the only ice skating facility in the Caribbean region. The facility is owned and administered by the city. The Ice Skating rink has been closed since it was heavily damaged during Hurricane Maria.

== Brief history ==
A.I.S.A. opened its doors in 2005 as the only facility of its kind in the Caribbean. Although Puerto Rico hosts several ice skating events during the Christmas season, the AISA was the only ice skating facility open year-round. The arena was designed & fabricated by Ice Rink Supply.com, using their internationally patented technology, for the Authority of Municipal Enterprises of the city. Aguadilla City Enterprises also administers Las Cascadas Water Park & Aguadilla Bowling Alley.

== Features ==
The AISA also hosts numerous stores and establishments:

=== First Floor ===
- 1 Roller Rink
- 1 Dinner Room (soon)
- 2 Meeting Rooms

=== Second Floor ===
- Music Room (City Band)
