= Academia Interamericana Metro =

Interamerican Metro Academy
- Academia Interamericana Metro
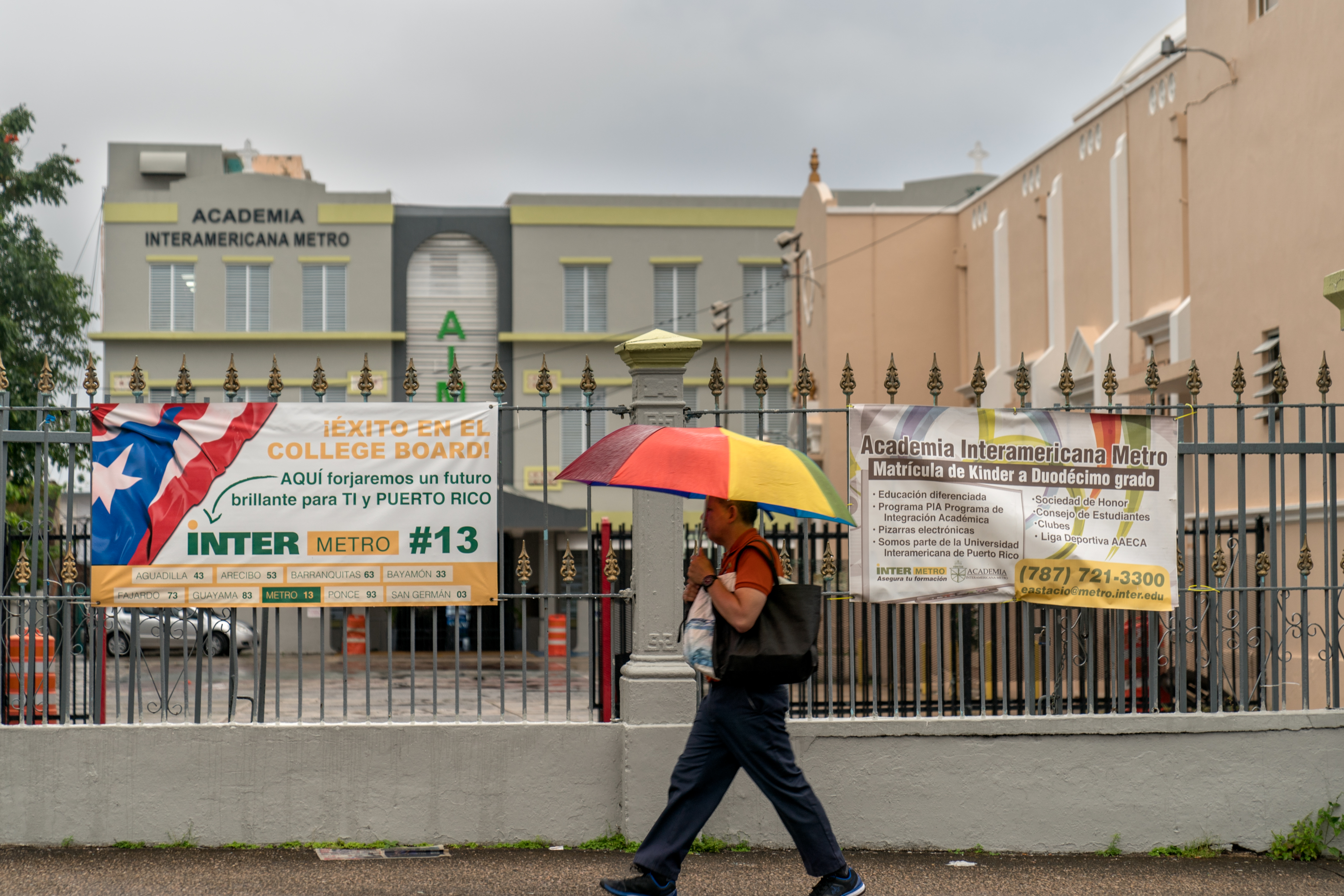

Location
- Ave. Ponce de León 1308, Parada 19; Santurce 00910; Puerto Rico; 18°26′54″N 66°04′21″W

Information
- Type: Private, Coeducational
- Motto: ANUEL (Truth)
- Established: 1928
- Principal: Mrs. Emely Astacio
- Grades: K-12
- Accreditation: Middle States Association of Colleges and Schools (1999)
- Affiliations: Catholic, Roman Catholic Archdiocese of San Juan de Puerto Rico

The Academia Interamericana Metro (previously Academia del Sagrado Corazón) was founded in 1928 as a private and religious school in Santurce, Puerto Rico by Inter American University of Puerto Rico- Metro Cumpus. The school provides elementary and high school education and is located in Avenida Ponce de León, at the Parada 19 in Santurce.

== Before foundation ==
Before the school was founded, a small school affiliated with the church had existed on the current parking lot grounds of the church. This early school was housed in a wooden structure that was destroyed when Hurricane Philip struck Puerto Rico in 1928. This early school had only been an elementary school that had added a new grade every year.
