= Las Cascadas Water Park =

Water park in Aguadilla, Puerto Rico

- Interactive map of Las Cascadas Water Park
- Location: Off PR-I-2; Aguadilla, Puerto Rico 00604
- Coordinates: 18°26′22″N 67°8′43″W
- Opened: 1985
- Owner: City of Aguadilla
- Operating season: February through September

Attractions
- Total: 10
- Website: Las Cascadas Water Park

Las Cascadas Water Park is a water park, in Aguadilla, Puerto Rico. The park is one of the largest water parks in the Caribbean region. The park is owned and administered by Aguadilla's municipal government.

Las Cascadas opened its doors in 1985 as the only facility of its kind in the Caribbean. The park was built under the municipal administration of Alfredo Gonzalez. The park is now part of the Authority of Municipal Enterprises (AME) of Aguaddilla. AME also administers the Aguadilla Ice Skating Arena.

The water park was closed since after Hurricane Maria struck Puerto Rico on September 20, 2017. In 2020, Federal Emergency Management Agency assigned over $917,000 in funds to repair the park.

In early 2022, phase 1 of repairs had been completed and the park was set to reopen. In May 2022, a portal for purchasing tickets was available to the public.

== List of rides ==
- Activity Pool (Piscina de Actividades) - An activity pool featuring slides and ziplines
- Aquatic Tunnel (Túnel Acuático) - Two-person or single tube slides in the dark
- Crazy River (Rio Loco) -
- Kiddie Pool (Piscina de Niños) - Children's play area
- Marine Serpent (Serpiente Marina) -
- Speed Slides (Chorreras Rapidas) - Two speedslides
- The Maze (El Laberinto) - Crazy experience that seems endless
- The Twister (El Torbellino) -
- Tropical Lazy River (Rio Tropical Pasivo) - Relaxing experience
- Wave Pool (Piscina de Olas) -
