= Museo de Vida Silvestre =

Wildlife museum in San Juan, Puerto Rico

Museo de Vida Silvestre Wildlife Museum
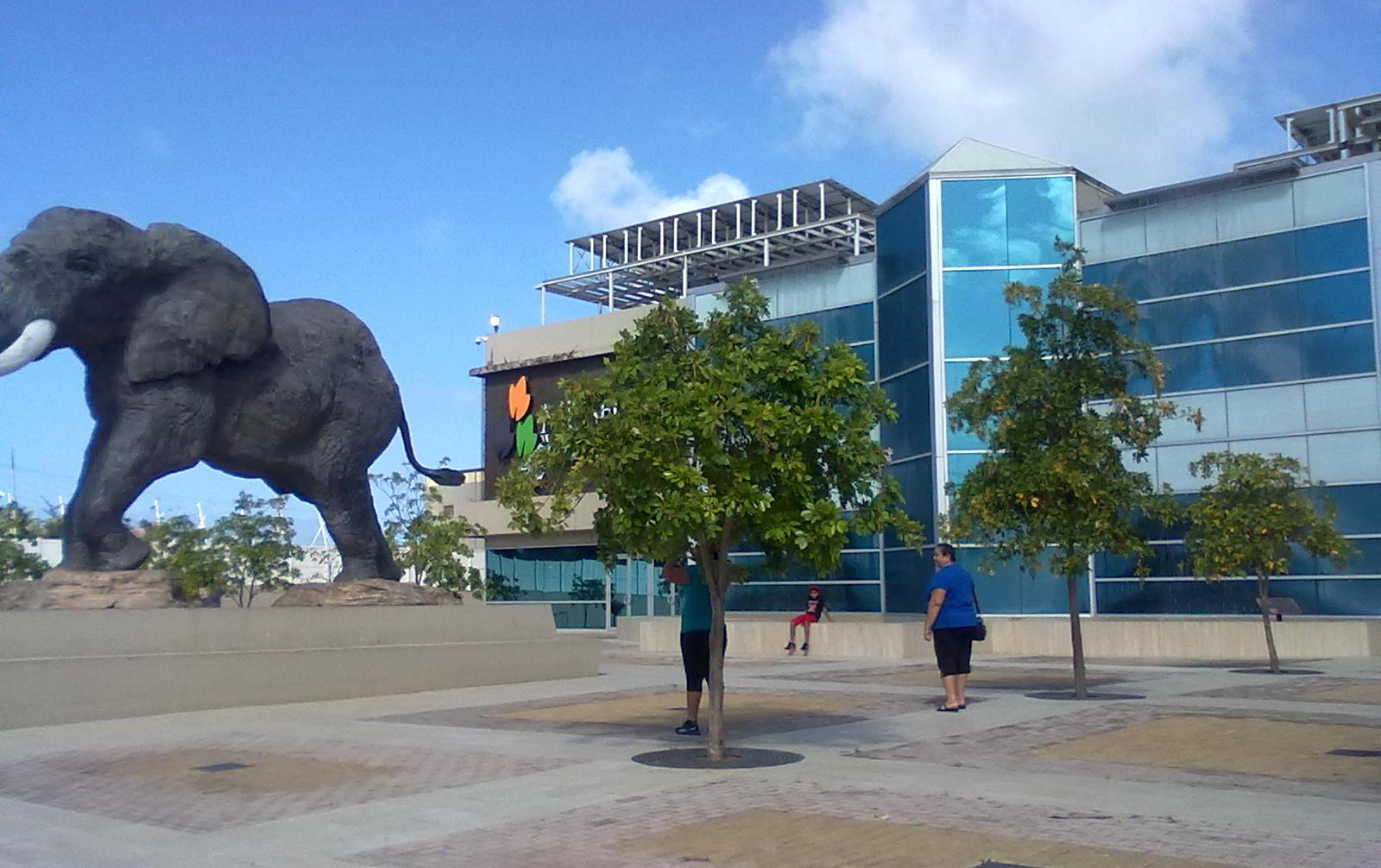

- Location within Puerto Rico
- Established: 2010
- Location: 1075 John F. Kennedy Ave. San Juan, Puerto Rico
- Coordinates: 18.26°N 66.511°W
- Type: Wildlife museum

The Museo de Vida Silvestre (in English, the Wildlife Museum) is located in San Juan, Puerto Rico. It was inaugurated on November 1, 2010, and houses more than 200 specimens in their respective habitats. The museum has garnered popularity in the island, receiving more than 100,000 visitors shortly after its first year.

== Building ==
The Museo de Vida Silvestre is located in the John F. Kennedy Avenue in San Juan, inside a 55,000 square feet, 2-story building. The building features several environmentally friendly elements within its structure, like the installation of ivy around it, and the use of photovoltaic cells to provide partial energy to the facilities.

== See also ==
- Tourism in Puerto Rico
