= Parque de Bombas Maximiliano Merced =

Historic building in Aguas Buenas, Puerto Rico

- U.S. National Register of Historic Places
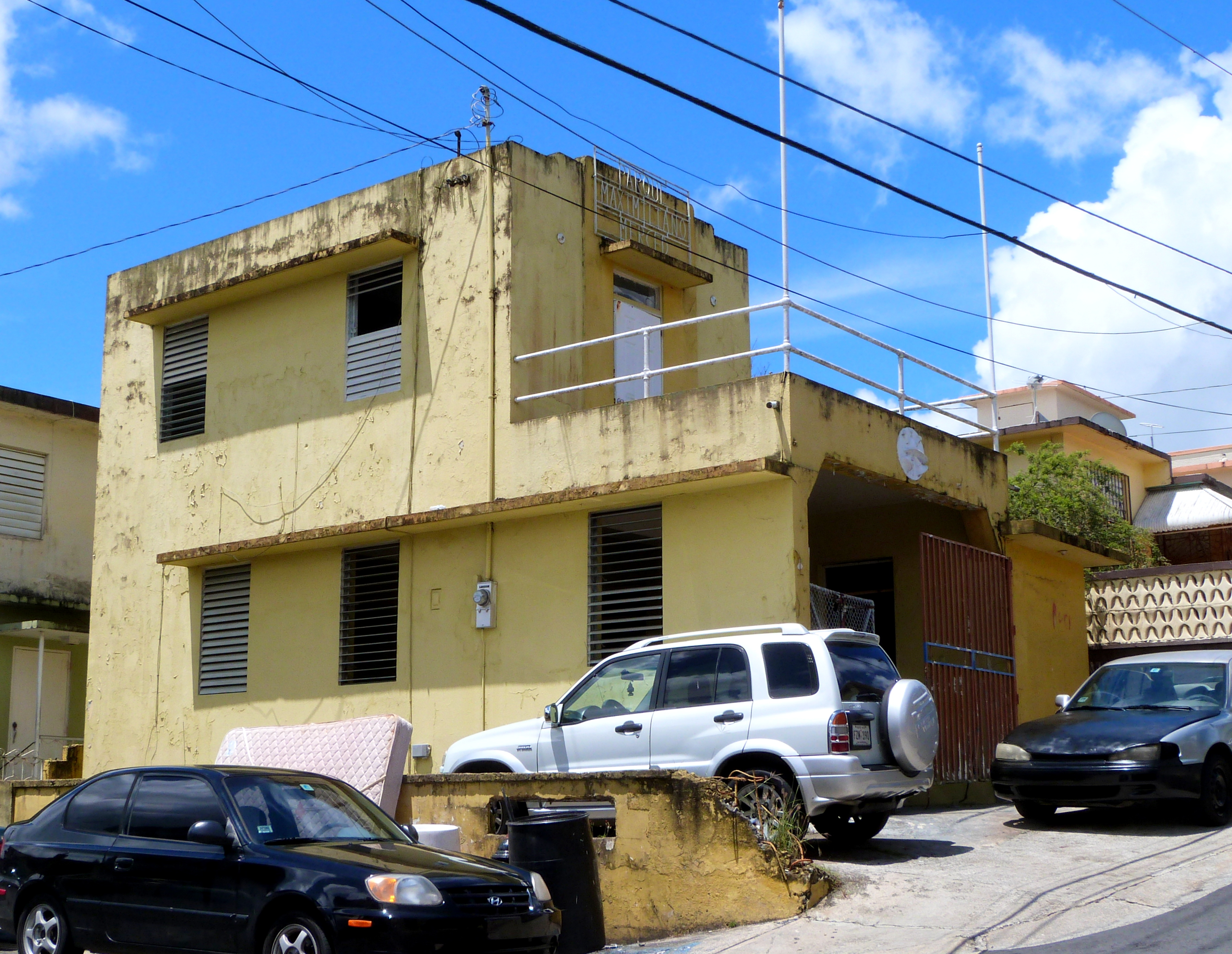

- Location within Puerto Rico
- Location: 42 Munoz Rivera St., Aguas Buenas, Puerto Rico
- Coordinates: 18°15′24″N 66°06′18″W
- Area: less than one acre
- Built: 1955
- Architect: Dept. of Public Works of Puerto Rico
- Architectural style: Art Deco
- MPS: Fire Stations in Puerto Rico MPS
- NRHP reference No.: 12000934
- Added to NRHP: November 12, 2012

The Parque de Bombas Maximiliano Merced, at 42 Muñoz Rivera Street in Aguas Buenas, Puerto Rico was built in 1955. It was listed on the National Register of Historic Places in 2012.

It has also been known as Parque Maximiliano Merced and as Antiguo Parque de Bombas de Aguas Buenas.
