= Plaza de San José =

Plaza de San José may refer to:

- San José Square in Pontevedra, Spain
- Plaza de San José, a park in Downtown San Jose, California
- Plaza de San José, a strip mall in King & Story, San Jose, California
