= House at 665 McKinley Street =

House in San Juan, Puerto Rico

- U.S. National Register of Historic Places
- Puerto Rico Historic Sites and Zones
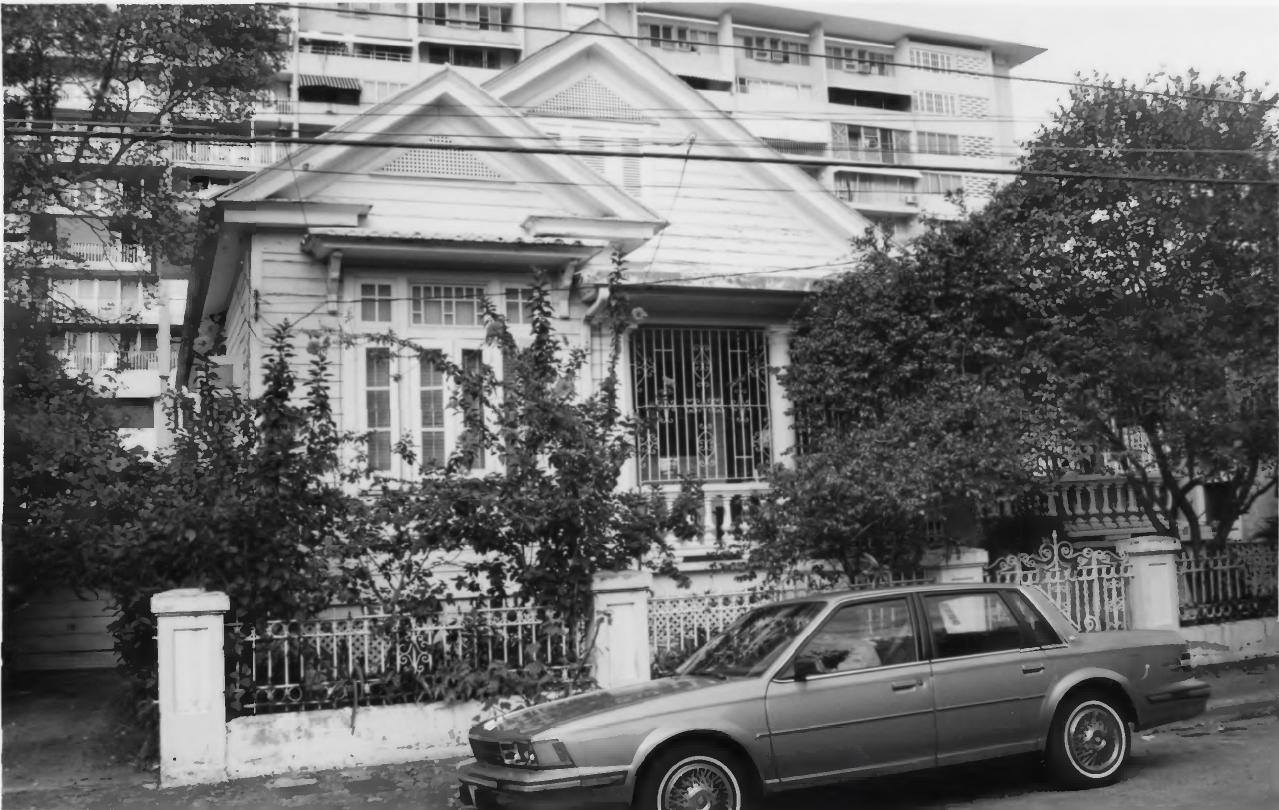
- The house in 1991.

- Location within Puerto Rico
- Location: 665 McKinley Street San Juan, Puerto Rico
- Coordinates: 18°27′19″N 66°05′01″W
- Built: 1906
- Architectural style: Spanish Creole Vernacular
- NRHP reference No.: 91001502
- RNSZH No.: 2000-(RMSJ)-00-JP-SH

Significant dates
- Added to NRHP: October 19, 1991
- Designated RNSZH: February 3, 2000

665 McKinley Street is a historic Spanish Creole vernacular-style house located in Miramar, a historic residential area of Santurce in the city of San Juan, Puerto Rico. The house was built in 1906 during a transitional period in the history of architecture in Puerto Rico when the local adaptations of Spanish vernacular styles were transitioning into the Spanish Revival styles that was being imported from the United States and adapted into the tropical environments of the island. The house is well-preserved and retains all elements of this period and, with the exception of the rear balcony, no modifications or alterations that modify the architectural integrity have been made. For this reason, it was added to the National Register of Historic Places in 1991, and on the Puerto Rico Register of Historic Sites and Zones in 2000.
