= List of Methodist churches =

This is a list of notable Methodist churches, either of notable congregations or of notable buildings or other places of worship. This very limited list reflects historically interesting sites, and omits most of the very largest Methodist congregations. Since the founding of Methodism in the mid-18th century, the movement has spread throughout the world, and remains a presence in many countries today.

Many church buildings are notable for their historical or architectural significance. Many of the historic churches can be found in the United Kingdom and the United States, but some are also located in Canada, China, Korea and other in countries where there has been a Methodist presence. In some cases the congregation which established the church has since disbanded but the building remains. This list is intended to comprehensively index notable Methodist churches world-wide.

== Australia ==
Church	Image	Dates	Location	City or Town	Description
Wesley Church, Melbourne		26 August 1858 Consecrated	37°48′37″S 144°58′5″E	Melbourne, Australia	Grand Gothic design with high quality architecture

== Barbados ==
Ann Gill Memorial Methodist Church, in Fairfield Road, Black Rock, St. Michael, honours the memory of Sarah Ann Gill, the sole female national heroine of Barbados.

== Canada ==
Two British Methodist Episcopal Church churches have been designated National Historic Sites of Canada due to their roles in welcoming Underground Railroad refugees to Canada and their historic importance to the Black community in the Niagara region:

Church	Image	Dates	Location	City or town	Description
R. Nathaniel Dett British Methodist Episcopal Church		1836 built	43°05′15″N 79°05′18″W	Niagara Falls, Ontario	Named in honour of Robert Nathaniel Dett
Salem Chapel, British Methodist Episcopal Church		1855 built	43°09′54″N 79°14′24″W	St. Catharines, Ontario	Linked to Harriet Tubman.
British Methodist Episcopal Church, Windsor, Ontario		1854 built, rebuilt 1856, rebuilt 1963	43°09′54″N 79°14′24″W	Windsor, Ontario	From 1856 to 1963 the BME church was an active church in its original location, 363 McDougall street.

== Puerto Rico ==
Church	Image	Dates	Location	City or Town	Description
Primera Iglesia Metodista Unida de Ponce		1907	Calle Villa 135; 18°00′37″N 66°36′58″W	Ponce	Methodist church built in 1907 that was architect Antonin Nechodoma's first commission in Puerto Rico.
McCabe Memorial Church		1908	835 Eugenio Maria de Hostos Ave. 17°58′56″N 66°37′14″W	Ponce	Another Nechodoma work.
Ernesto Memorial Chapel		1912	Intersection of PR 486 & PR 488; 18°25′59″N 66°51′17″W	Camuy	Designed by Albert Munson

== Singapore ==
Church	Image	Dates	Location	City or Town	Description
Wesley Methodist Church			5 Fort Canning Road1.297949°N 103.847623°E	Singapore	Oldest Methodist church with an English-speaking congregation in Singapore

== United Kingdom ==
The first Methodist churches were in Norwich (1757), in Rotherham (1761), in Whitby (1762), and in Heptonstall (1764).

About 700 Methodist chapels in the United Kingdom have been identified as significant buildings for their architecture or history by author Ian Serjeant, who has served as Conservation Officer for the Methodist church since 1996.

A list of Methodist churches that are listed buildings was prepared by the U.K. Methodist church's division of property in 1976. A standing committee of the Methodist Church of Britain is charged with having "knowledge of the history, development and use of Methodist chapels, of Methodist liturgy and worship, or archaeology, of the history and the development of architecture and the visual arts, and the experience of the care of historic buildings and their contents", and to advise on about 250 renovation projects per year to the Methodist listed buildings.

John Wesley, the founder of Methodism, is said to have had a preference for octagonal buildings, as exemplified by the Heptonstall Methodist Church in West Yorkshire, England.

Appropriate style for Methodist church buildings was debated during the mid-1800s. Architect-trained Reverend Frederick Jobson argued for "beauty and perfection in design and execution without unnecessary adornment"; the governing body of Methodism adopted his works and Gothic architecture "became the predominant style, particularly within Wesleyan Methodism."

Church	Image	Dates	Location	City or Town	Description
St. John’s Methodist Church, Arbroath		1772 built	56°33′40.99″N 2°35′8.54″W	Arbroath Angus, Scotland	A listed building in Category B that is identified by Serjeant as particularly notable. It was opened by John Wesley in 1772. Remodellings and other changes in 1882, 1896, and 1946 have hidden the octagonal chapel behind the later frontage.
Wesleyan Church, Aldershot		1874-77 built Grade II* listed building	51°14′55″N 0°46′3″W	Aldershot, Hampshire	Built to reflect the expansion of the town of Aldershot with the arrival of the Military Camp during the mid to late 19th-century. Now redundant and used as offices, homes, a dental surgery and gymnasium.
Altarnum Methodist Chapel		1859 built	50°36′10.8″N 4°30′39.6″W	Altarnun, Cornwall	A typical building reflecting the values expressed by Jobson.
Wesley's Chapel		1777–78 built	51.5238°N 0.0866°W	Islington, London	Known as 'The Mother Church of World Methodism', having been built by John Wesley, and acting as his London base. The portico was added in 1814–15, and there have been other alterations and additions since. The building is listed at Grade I.
Methodist Central Hall		1905-11 built	51°30′00″N 0°07′48″W	Westminster, London	Built in order to commemorate the centenary of the death of the founder of Methodism, John Wesley.
Heptonstall Methodist Church		1764 built	53°45′11.12″N 2°2′13.78″W	West Yorkshire	Octagonal chapel whose foundation stone was laid by John Wesley. Church was completed in 1764 in symmetric octagon shape, but was extended in 1802 to provide for more space. Wesley recommended the octagonal shape to differentiate from the established church. The building was featured in a 2010 BBC Four series Churches: How to Read Them, in which Dr Richard Taylor named it as one of his ten favourite churches, saying: "If buildings have an aura, this one radiated friendship." See photo here .
Moor Park Methodist Church		1861-62 built		Preston, Lancashire, England	Designed by Poulton and Woodman, opened 1862, seating for 900, closed 1984.
Preston Central Methodist Church		1817 built		Preston, Lancashire, England	Active, Methodist church whose building was one of the first public buildings in the country to be lit by gas.
Surrey Chapel, Southwark		1783 built 1881 demolished		London	Independent Methodist and Congregational church, located at first in open fields, then enveloped by industrial development. Circular in plan with domed roof, its design was of interest.
Trinity Independent Chapel		1841 built 1944 demolished	51°30′41″N 0°1′8″W	London	
West Street Chapel		First leased in 1743 by John Wesley		London	
West London Methodist Mission		Established in 1887 under Hugh Price Hughes		London	
Bethesda Methodist Chapel		1819 built 1972 Grade II*-listed		Stoke on Trent	
Brunswick Methodist Chapel		1820 built 1987 Grade II-listed		Newcastle upon Tyne	

== United States ==
In the United States, numerous Methodist churches are listed on the National Register of Historic Places and on state and local historic registers, many of which reflect the values of plainness, of Gothic architecture, of simple adornment. The Greek Revival style is also simple and came to be adopted for numerous American Methodist churches.

Several, selected significant Methodist churches in the U.S. are:

Church	Image	Dates	Location	City, State	Description
Barratt's Chapel		1780 built 1972 NRHP-listed	39°1′28.6″N 75°27′34.36″W	Frederica, Delaware	"Cradle of Methodism", where Methodism first took hold in the United States in 1784
Lovely Lane United Methodist Church		1884 built 1973 NRHP-listed	39°18′52″N 76°36′57″W	Baltimore, Maryland	Romanesque Revival style, known as the Mother Church of American Methodism
St. George's United Methodist Church		1767 built 1971 NRHP-listed	39°57′17.9″N 75°8′46.82″W	Philadelphia	The oldest Methodist church worship in continuous use in the United States.
Mother Bethel African Methodist Episcopal Church		1794 built 1972 NRHP-listed	39°56′35″N 75°9′9″W	Philadelphia	Romanesque style, The founding church of the African Methodist Episcopal Church.

For a more complete list, see List of Methodist churches in the United States.
