= List of churches in Ponce, Puerto Rico =

This list of churches in Ponce, Puerto Rico, consists of churches in the municipality of Ponce, Puerto Rico, that enjoy notability.

== Church list summary table ==
No.	Name	Built	Rebuilt	Location	Architecture	Comment	Photo
1	Catedral de Nuestra Señora de Guadalupe	1670	1839	Segundo	Neoclassical	Tied to the founding of the city	
2	Iglesia de la Santísima Trinidad	1873	1926	Cuarto	Gothic	Oldest Protestant church in Latin America	
3	Iglesia Santa María Reina	1957	-	Canas Urbano	Modern and Gothic	Award-winning vaulted roof	
4	Iglesia Metodista Unida	1908	-	Playa	Neo Gothic	Originally named after Bishop Charles Cardwell McCabe	
5	Primera Iglesia Metodista Unida de Ponce	1907	-	Primero	Neo-Gothic, Spanish revival, Spanish Baroque, and Byzantine	First structure in Puerto Rico by Antonin Nechodoma	

== Gallery ==
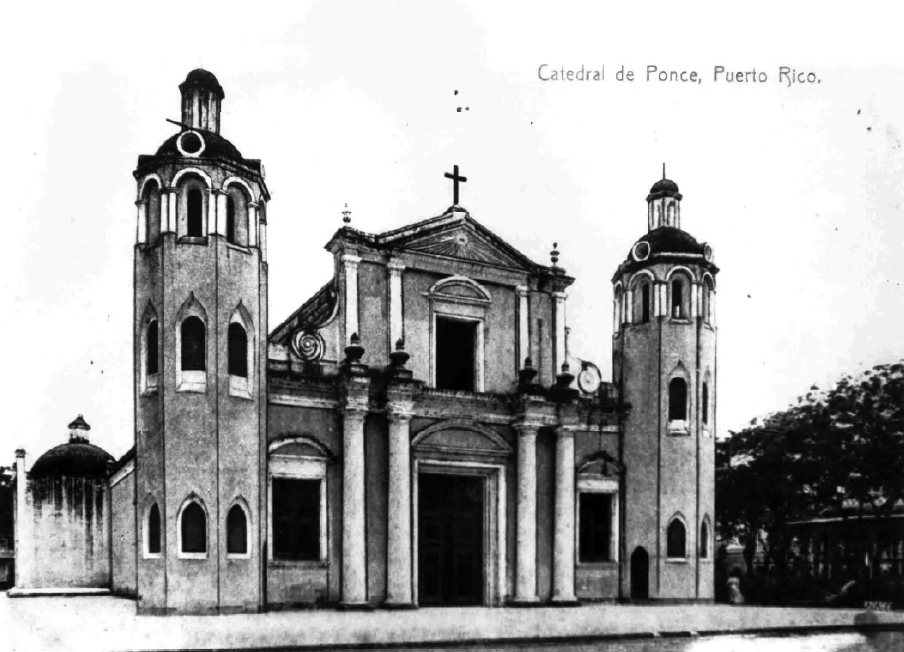
Catedral de Ponce, around 1910

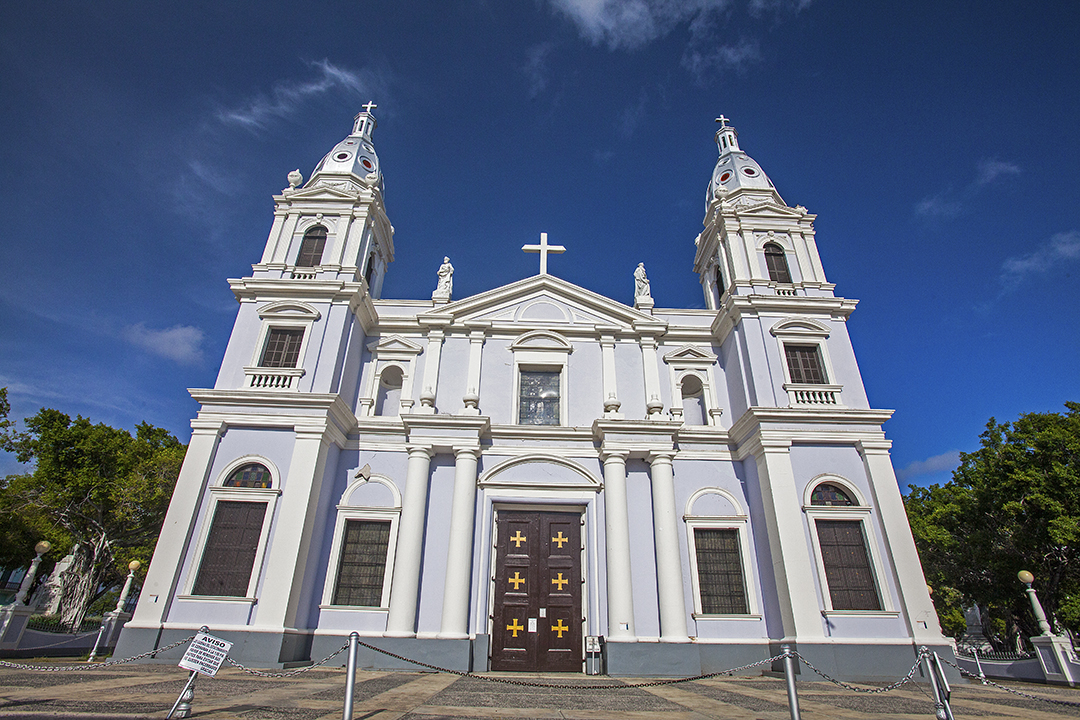
Catedral Nuestra Señora de Guadalupe

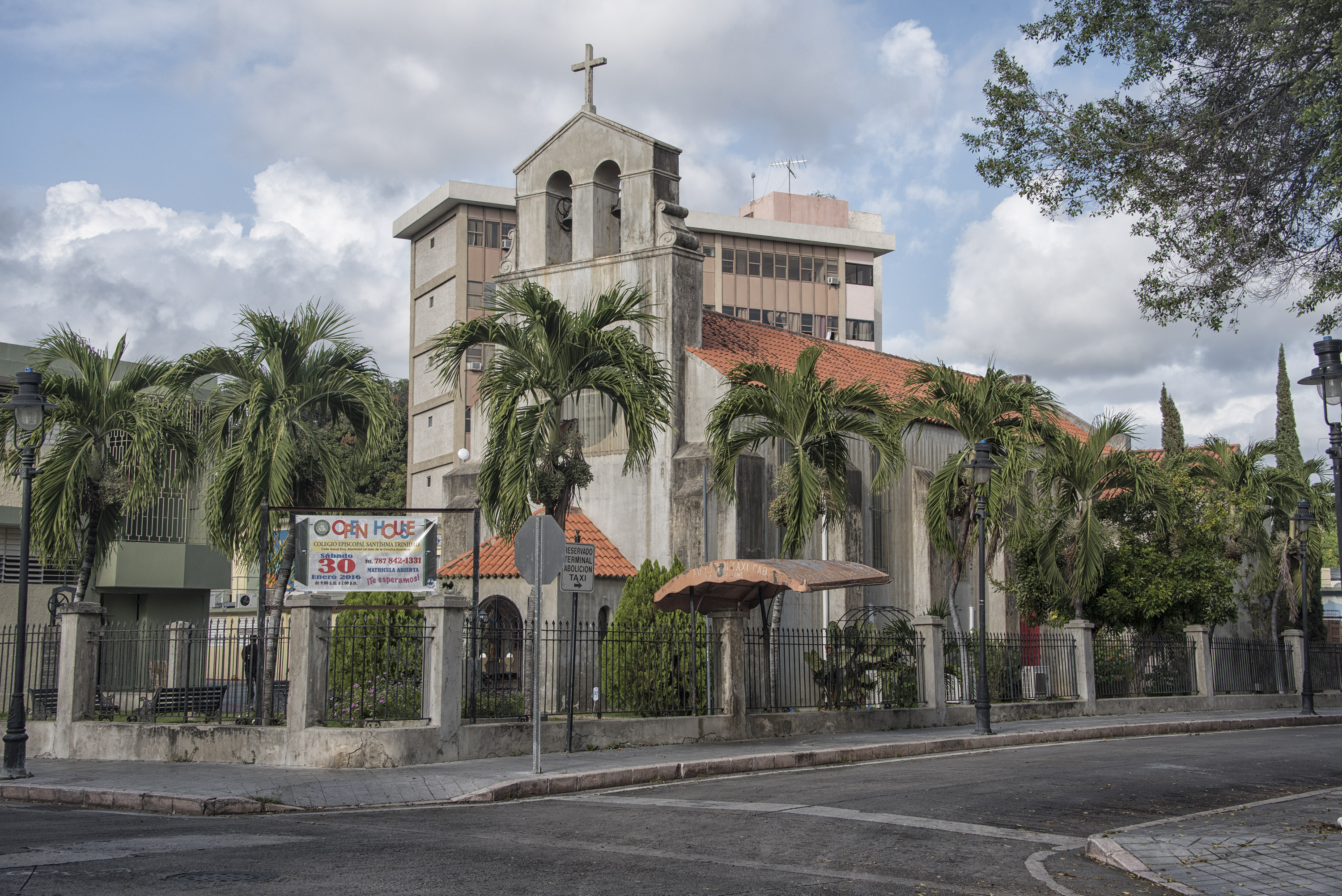
Iglesia de la Santisima Trinidad
