= Barratt Hall =

Historic house in Delaware, United States

- U.S. National Register of Historic Places
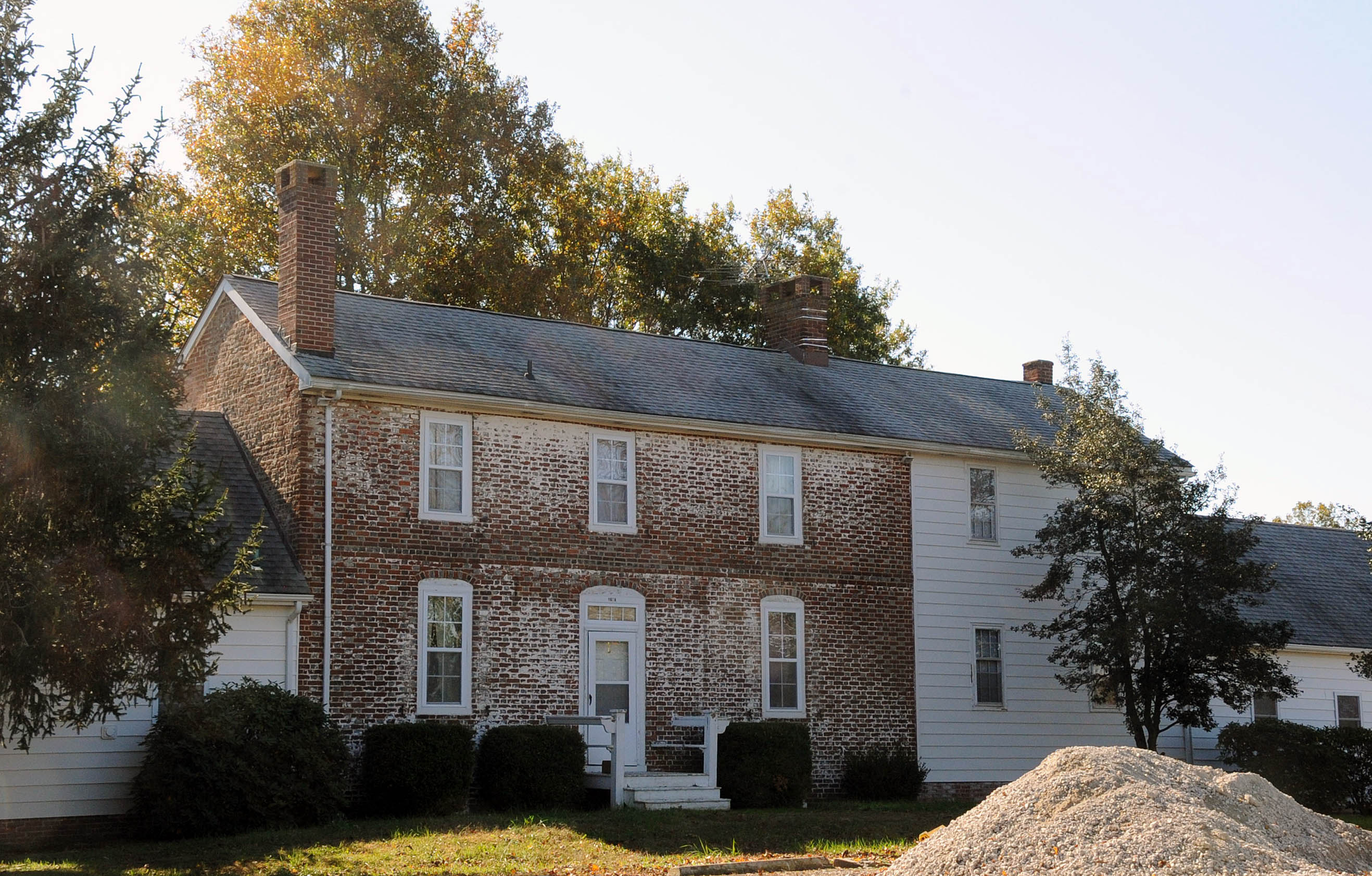

- Location within Delaware Location within the United States
- Location: South of Frederica off Road 372, near Frederica, Delaware
- Coordinates: 39°1′29″N 75°26′24″W
- Area: 1 acre (0.40 ha)
- Built: 1784
- Architectural style: Georgian
- NRHP reference No.: 73000492
- Added to NRHP: April 13, 1973

Barratt Hall, also known as the Philip Barratt House, is a historic home located near Frederica, Kent County, Delaware. It dates to the mid-18th century, and is a two-story, three-bay, center-hall plan brick dwelling in the Georgian-style. In 1784, Bishops Thomas Coke and Francis Asbury met in the house with Mrs. Miriam Barratt and eleven preachers. They held council here which ended in sending Freeborn Garrettson to summon preachers to the Christmas Conference in Baltimore, Maryland, at which the Methodist Church in America was organized. It was the home of Philip Barratt, who donated land and, together with Waitman Sipple, erected Barratt's Chapel in 1780.

It was listed on the National Register of Historic Places in 1973.

== Description ==
A fine illustration of an early Georgian house in Delaware is the Philip Barratt House, constructed during the mid-eighteenth century. The house is erected on a center hall plan with a three-bay north frontage. The north façade is faced with brick laid in Flemish bond with glazed headers. The center bay of the entryway is topped by a rectangular light, and all of the openings are arched with segmental arches. A box cornice adorns both the front and rear elevations. The three-brick-wide belt course, which encircles the north, west, and south walls, is noteworthy due to the use of glazed headers for the center course. The west gable wall is laid in a combination of Flemish and English bonds. Both stories of the chimney stack appear to have small windows on either side, as suggested by the inconsistencies in the brickwork. To the east gable wall is joined by a lower frame wing. The wing, which has undergone significant reconstruction, now includes a kitchen, bathroom, and quarters for servants. The interior of the Barratt House consists of two rooms of modest proportions flanking a center hall. The west room is the larger, and features a finely paneled end wall. The paneling now features a mantel with a reeded design. The east room contains a corner fireplace with fireplace breast paneling and a mantel added at a later time. A door leading to the kitchen wing balances out the fireplace. The first-floor rooms feature chair railing and crown moldings.

On the second floor the west chamber is the only room retaining a fireplace. The end wall, which is paneled, hides both a closet and a ladder stairway that leads to the unfinished attic. The only major alterations in the main house block include the addition of a bathroom and closets.

== Significance ==
In 1784, Bishops Thomas Coke and Francis Asbury convened with eleven preachers in the home of Miriam Barratt to hold a council that ultimately led to the organization of the Methodist Church in America at the Christmas Conference in Baltimore. In 1755, Philip Barratt and his brother Roger, who were born in Cecil County, Maryland, relocated to Kent County. Philip Barratt farmed the land that was originally granted to Thomas Williams and Peter Groendyk in 1680, known as "Williams Chance," and also engaged in shipping with Philadelphia. Governor John Penn appointed him as the High Sheriff of Kent County in 1775, and he was subsequently elected as Sheriff in 1776. Philip Barratt was also a justice of the peace for the county and a member of the State Legislature, but his most significant contribution was in the establishment of the Methodist Church in America. He donated land and partnered with Waitman Sipple to construct Barratt's Chapel in 1780. Caleb Barratt, one of Philip and Miriam's sons, inherited the Barratt house and farm, which was later passed on to James Barratt before being relinquished from the family's control when he moved to Milton in 1823.
