= Miramar (Santurce) =

Subbarrio of Santurce in San Juan, Puerto Rico

- Subbarrio
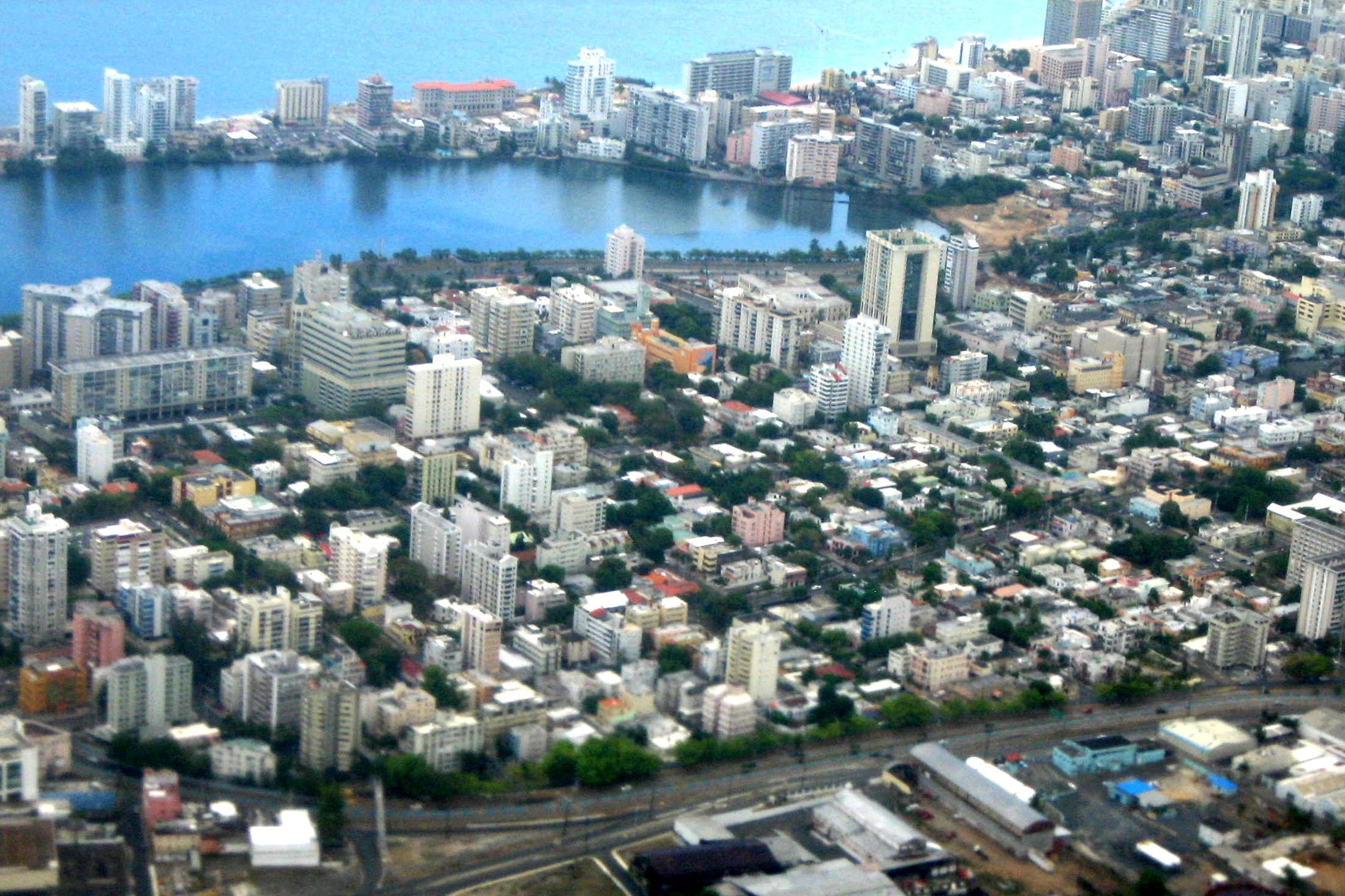
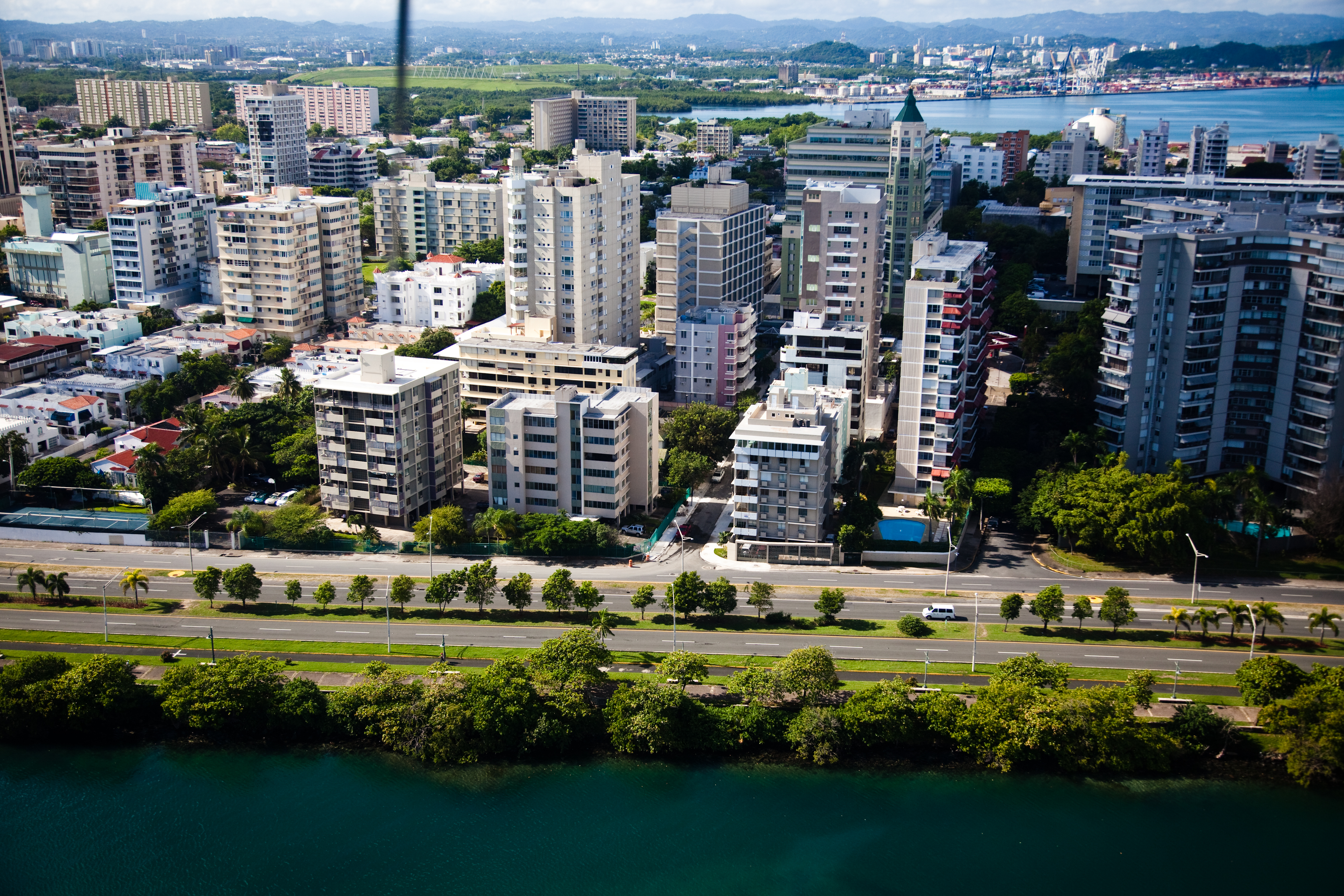
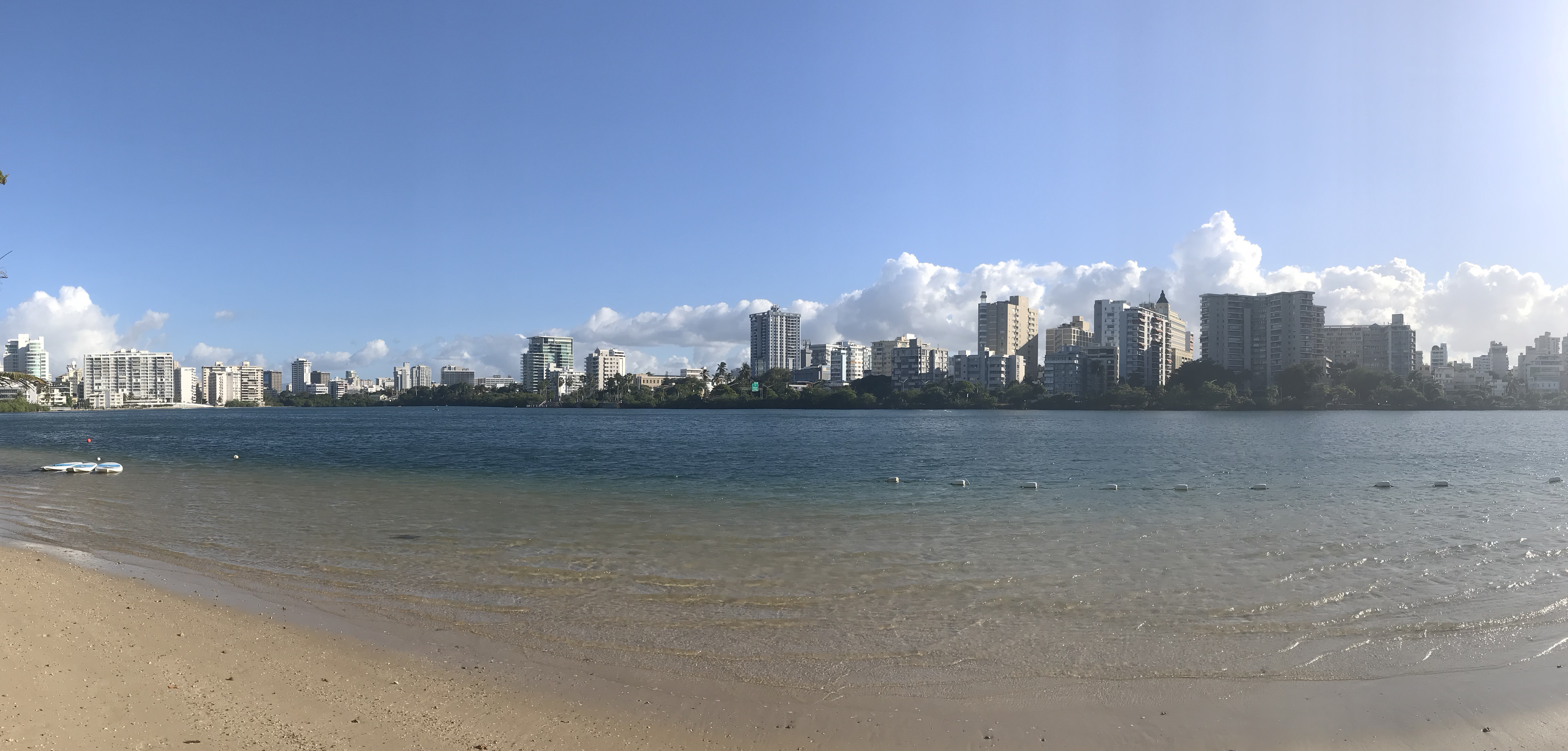
- Miramar (foreground) and Condado (background) districts Miramar from Condado Lagoon

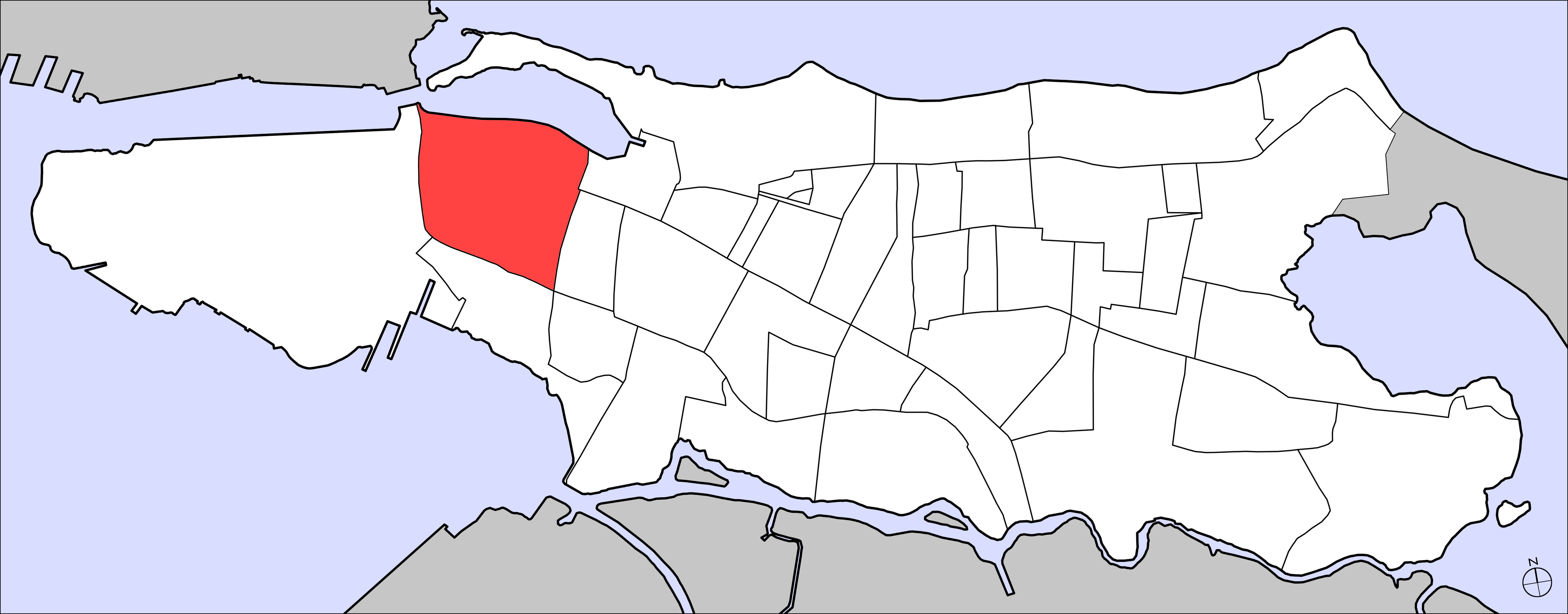
- Coordinates: 18°27′14″N 66°04′57″W
- Country: United States
- Commonwealth: Puerto Rico
- Municipality: San Juan
- Barrio: Santurce

Area
  - Total: .27 sq mi (0.70 km^{2})
  - Land: .24 sq mi (0.62 km^{2})
  - Water: .03 sq mi (0.078 km^{2})
- Elevation: 52 ft (16 m)

Population (2010)
  - Total: 4,412
  - Density: 18,383.3/sq mi (7,097.8/km^{2})
- Source: 2010 Census
- Time zone: UTC−4 (AST)

Miramar is one of the forty subbarrios of Santurce, San Juan, Puerto Rico. The neighborhood has many historic Spanish Revival-style homes with patios and gardens, and it was listed on the Puerto Rico Register of Historic Sites and Zones in 2007 for its historical and architectural value.

== History ==
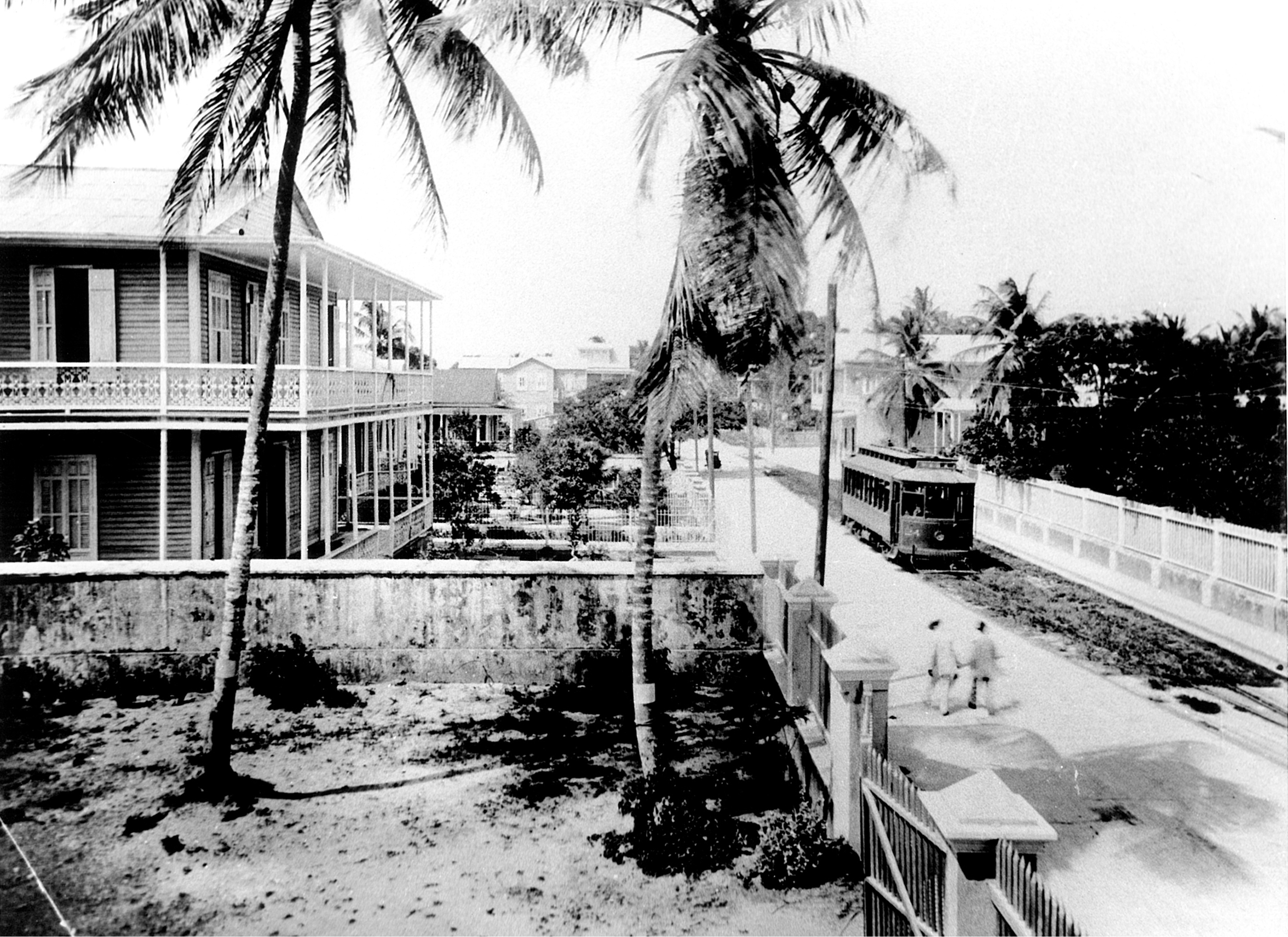
San Juan electric tram in Miramar on the Carretera Central, today Ponce de León Avenue

The neighborhood is under the legal jurisdiction of Santurce in the municipality of San Juan, Puerto Rico. It first appears in the 16th century as a spring that fed water to the Spanish outpost of Old San Juan. During the Battle of San Juan (17 April – 2 May 1797), the town of Miramar was the site of the British ill-fated British assault on the Spanish colonial port city of San Juan de Puerto Rico during the 1796–1808 Anglo-Spanish War.

In the 17th century a wide public street, the Central Highway, (today Ponce de León Avenue) was built that ran through the spring. Commerce flourished since goods that arrived at the port of San Juan had to pass Miramar on their way to the rest of the island. Today two set of bridges known as San Antonio and Dos Hermanos connects the adjoining areas of Old San Juan and Condado. Its land area measures 0.24 sq. miles (0.62 km^{2}), and has a resident population of 5,440 according to the 2000 United States census.

Miramar, since its beginnings had large wooden plantation-style homes with expansive land lots. In the 1950s well known architects from the time period built extravagant homes in Miramar that are still preserved.

Miramar is home to several structures registered at the National Register of Historic Places, such as Casa Aboy-Lompré, a cultural center that was declared a historic building in the year 1989, focusing on the preservation and creation of photographic art. Another example is the Our Lady of Lourdes Chapel, declared a historic building in the year 1984.

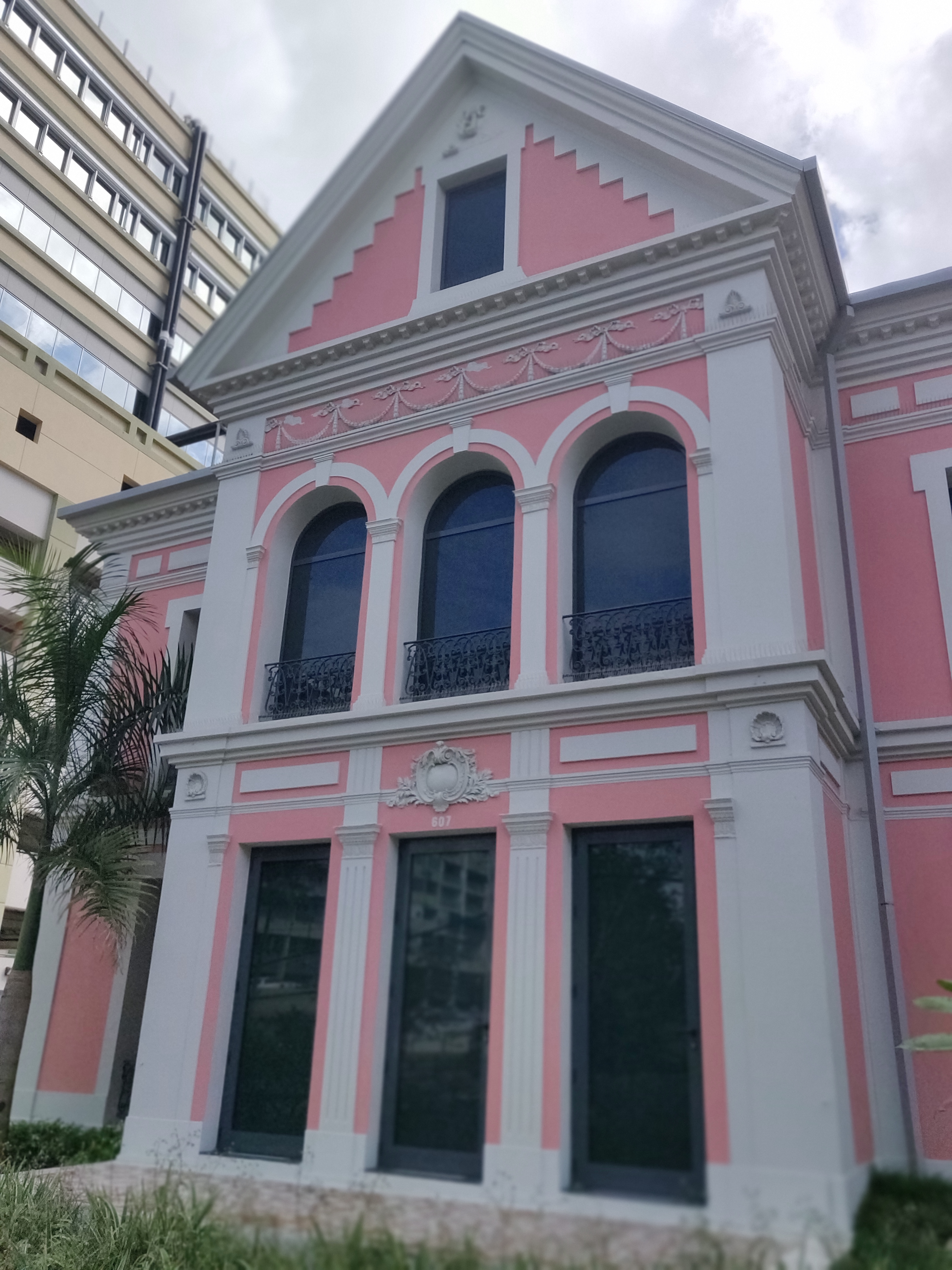
Museum of Art and Design in Miramar

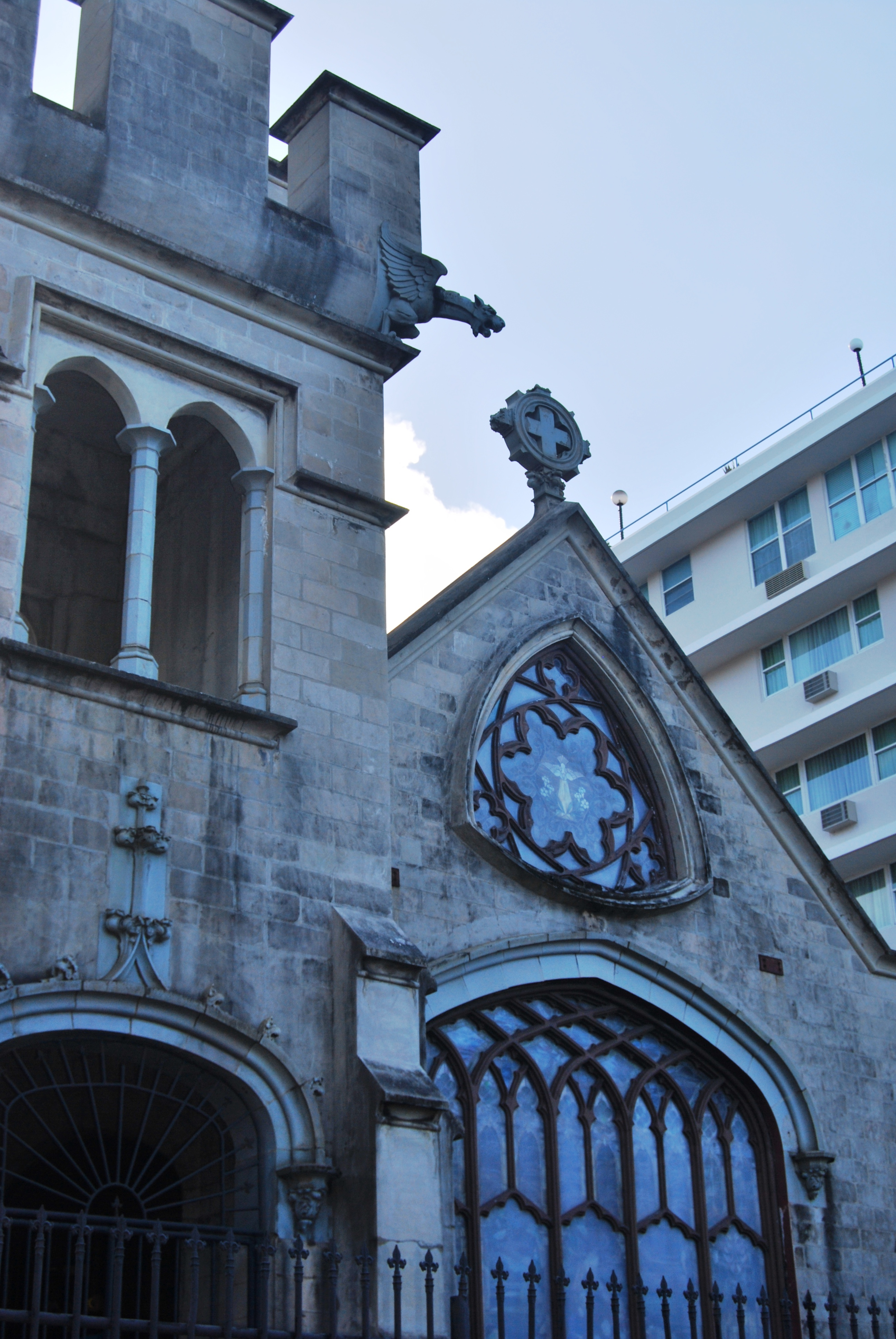
Our Lady of Lourdes Chapel

== Location ==
Miramar is situated on the northwestern part of Santurce, adjacent to Isla Grande where the Puerto Rico Convention Center is located to the west. Baldorioty de Castro Boulevard and Condado Lagoon are to the north, Alto del Cabro barrios and Gandul are to the east, and Hoare Street is to the south of Miramar.

== Demographics ==
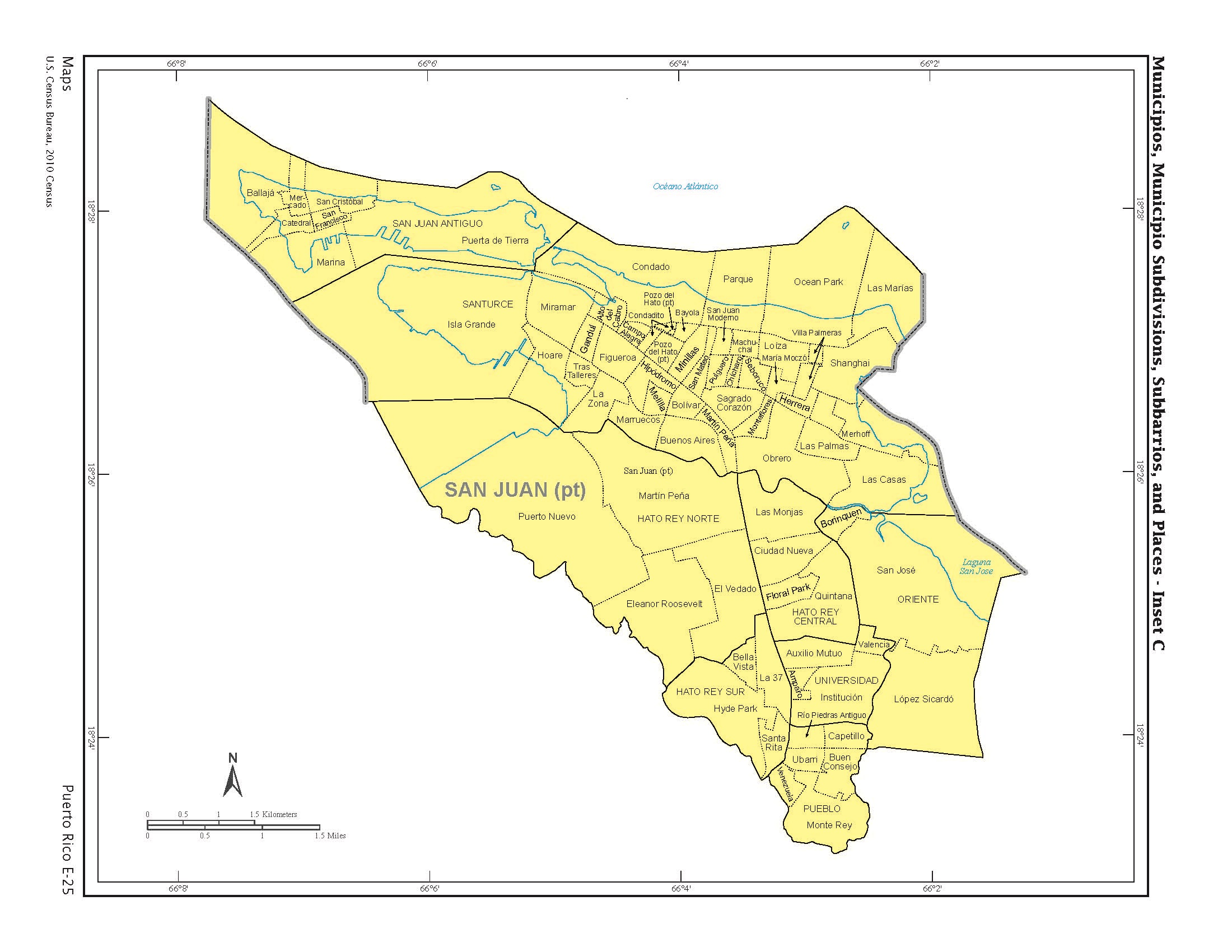
US 2010 Census map of Subdivisions, Subbarrios, and Places of San Juan in Puerto Rico

In 2000, Miramar had a population of 5,540.

In 2010, Miramar had a population of 4,412 and a population density of 18,383.3 persons per square mile.

Historical population
Year	Pop.	±%
1940	4,493	—
1950	4,686	+4.3%
1960	4,796	+2.3%
1970	5,811	+21.2%
1980	5,866	+0.9%
1990	5,266	−10.2%
2000	5,440	+3.3%
2010	4,412	−18.9%
U.S. Decennial Census; 1940–1950 1980–2000 2010

== Neighborhood ==
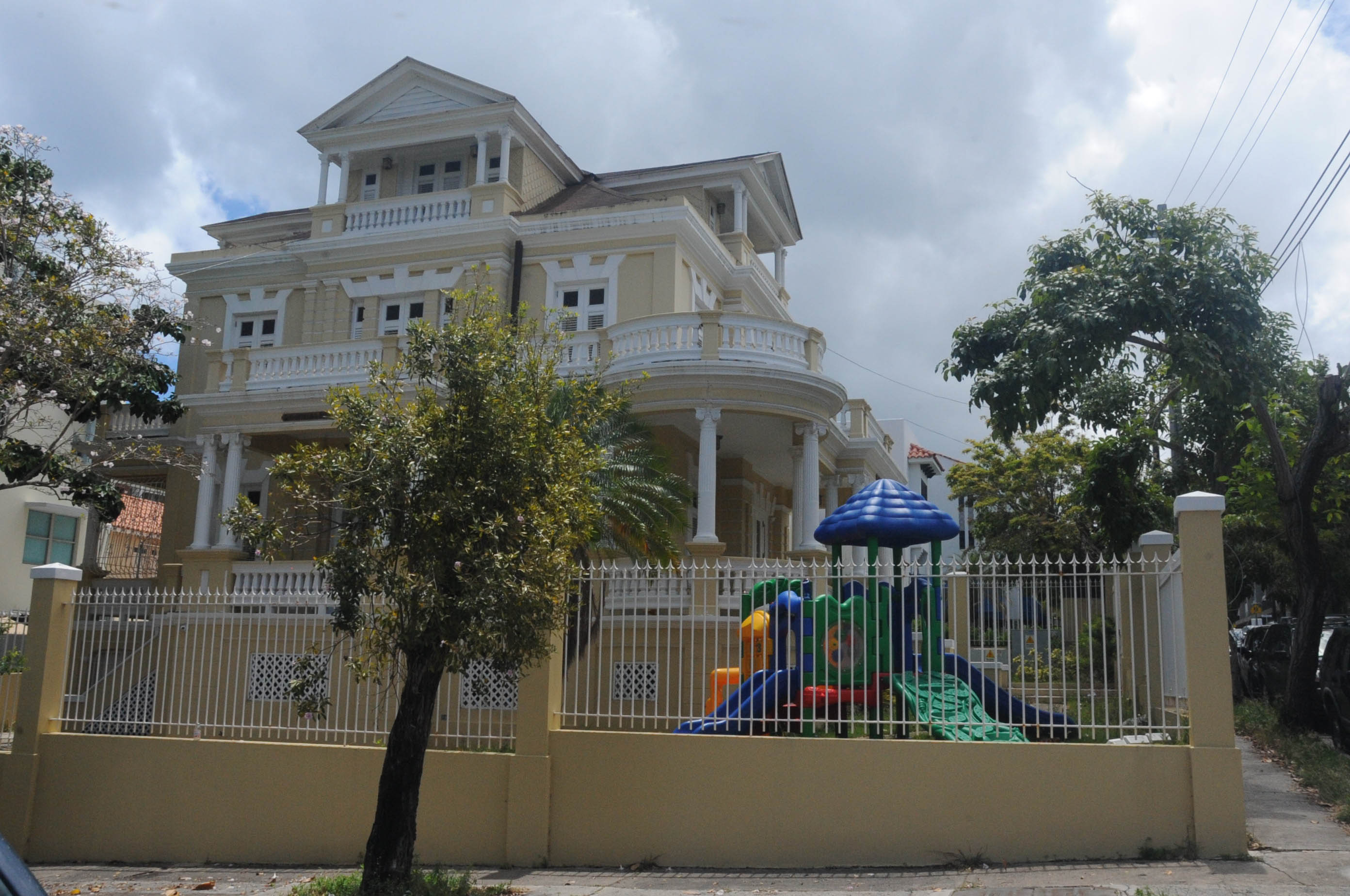
Historic home in Miramar

Miramar is an exclusive residential neighbourhood where primarily middle to upper-class families reside, characterized by quiet streets lined with large, mature shade trees. There are still a handful of historical residences with the charm and atmosphere from the bygone era including several Prairie School architectural style buildings by internationally renowned architect Antonin Nechodoma. Miramar's rich architectural legacy is now protected by law as it was designated an historical district of Puerto Rico. The government of Puerto Rico has passed a law declaring Miramar a Historic Town.

Miramar's Residents Association has had two legal triumphs in the court system that have helped define zoning laws and development sustainability.

The Justice Department of Puerto Rico (which can be seen in the picture, third condo from right to left, dark colored] is located in Miramar, and had plans to expand their facilities. Expropriation processes were begun for adjacent lots. The Association took the matter to court and simultaneously began lobbying in the Puerto Rico Legislature. Their endeavors resulted in the passing of a law declaring the historic value of the area, and officially declaring Miramar a historic district. Thus, the courts ruled such zoning laws pertaining to historic districts prohibited the proposed expansion plans. To this day, the adjacent lots are empty, but the department has abandoned their proposed expansion.

The second victory for the Residents was in the halting of construction of a four-lane expressway that was begun on the south part of Miramar. The proposed plans were considered to be an abuse of the environment (hundred-year-old trees would have been cut down), the highway would not meet noise emission levels in regular traffic hours (as established by law for historic districts), and various condos and houses would become isolated from the rest of the town. In an unexpected move, in 2010 Mayor Jorge Santini proposed that instead of building the highway, a green concept should be pursued and a light rail program called SaTour was to be built. The plan is part of the San Juan Walkable City proposed plan, which is intended to connect Miramar to the Train system already in place called Tren Urbano. When completed, Miramar will have a direct access through train with Hato Rey, Guaynabo, and Bayamón.

Miramar is home to the coeducational Catholic parochial school Academia del Perpetuo Socorro, the Puerto Rico Convention Center, the Isla Grande Airport, the Cruise ship Pan-American Cruise Pier, the luxurious yacht harbor of Club Nautico, and the Puerto Rico Conservatory of Music.

Miramar is located two miles from Old San Juan, three miles from shopping mecca Condado, and four miles from the international airport Luis Muñoz Marín.

== Historical Battles ==
On 1797 Miramar witnessed the English Royal Navy under the reign of George III of the United Kingdom and led by the mighty Abercromby shell of the Fortín de San Gerónimo in Old San Juan.

== Gallery ==
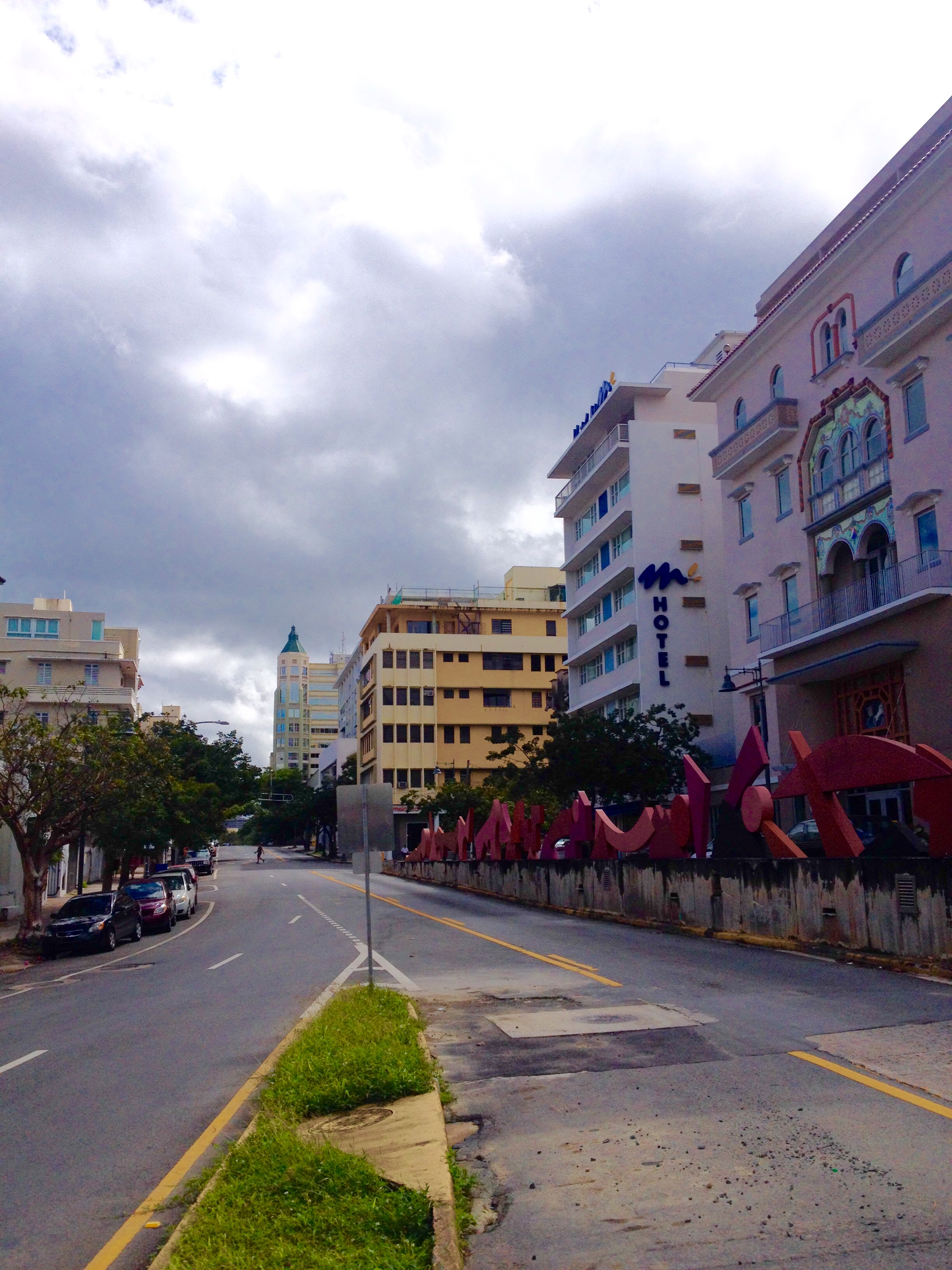
Street view of Miramar

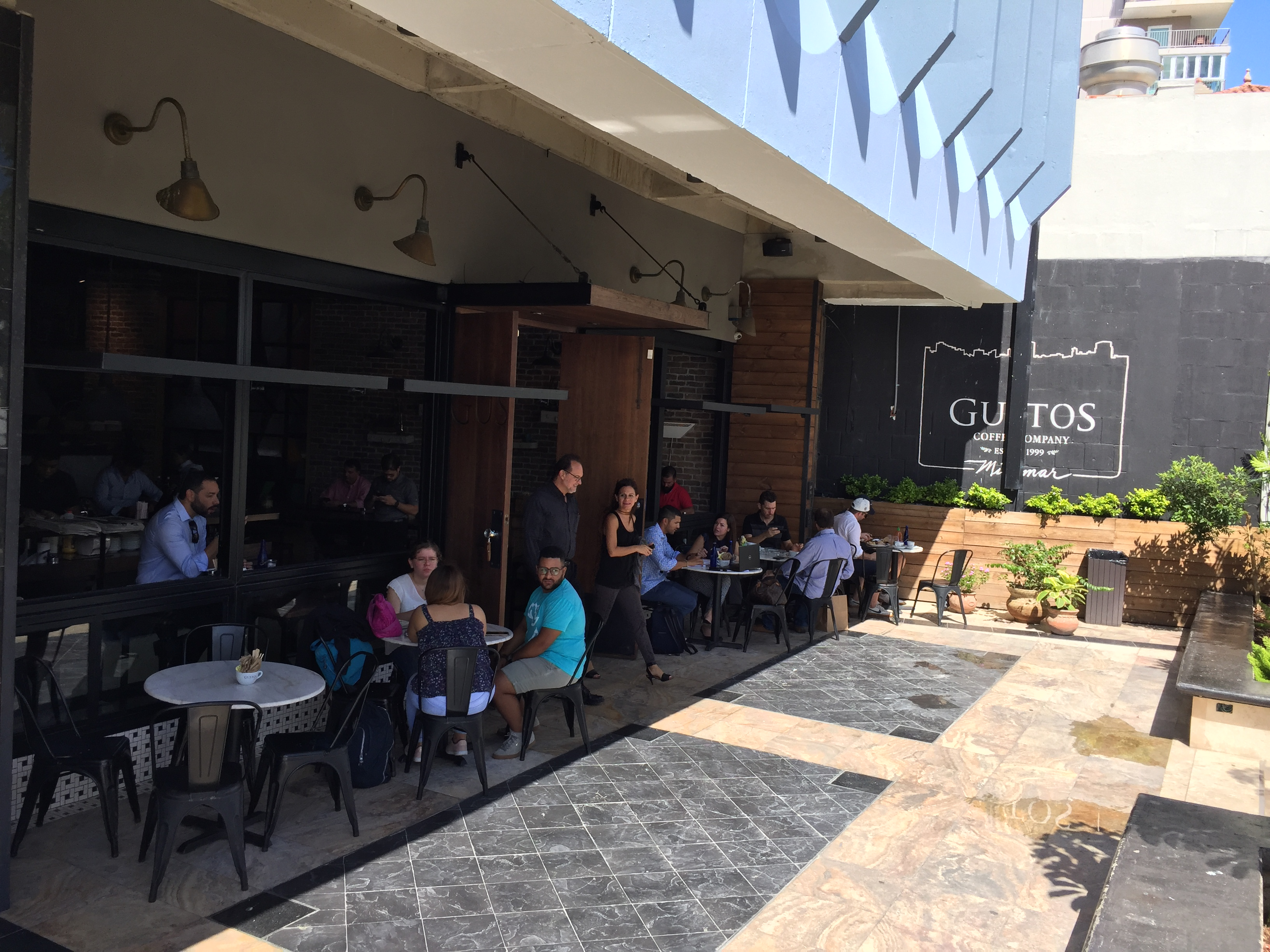
Street café in Miramar

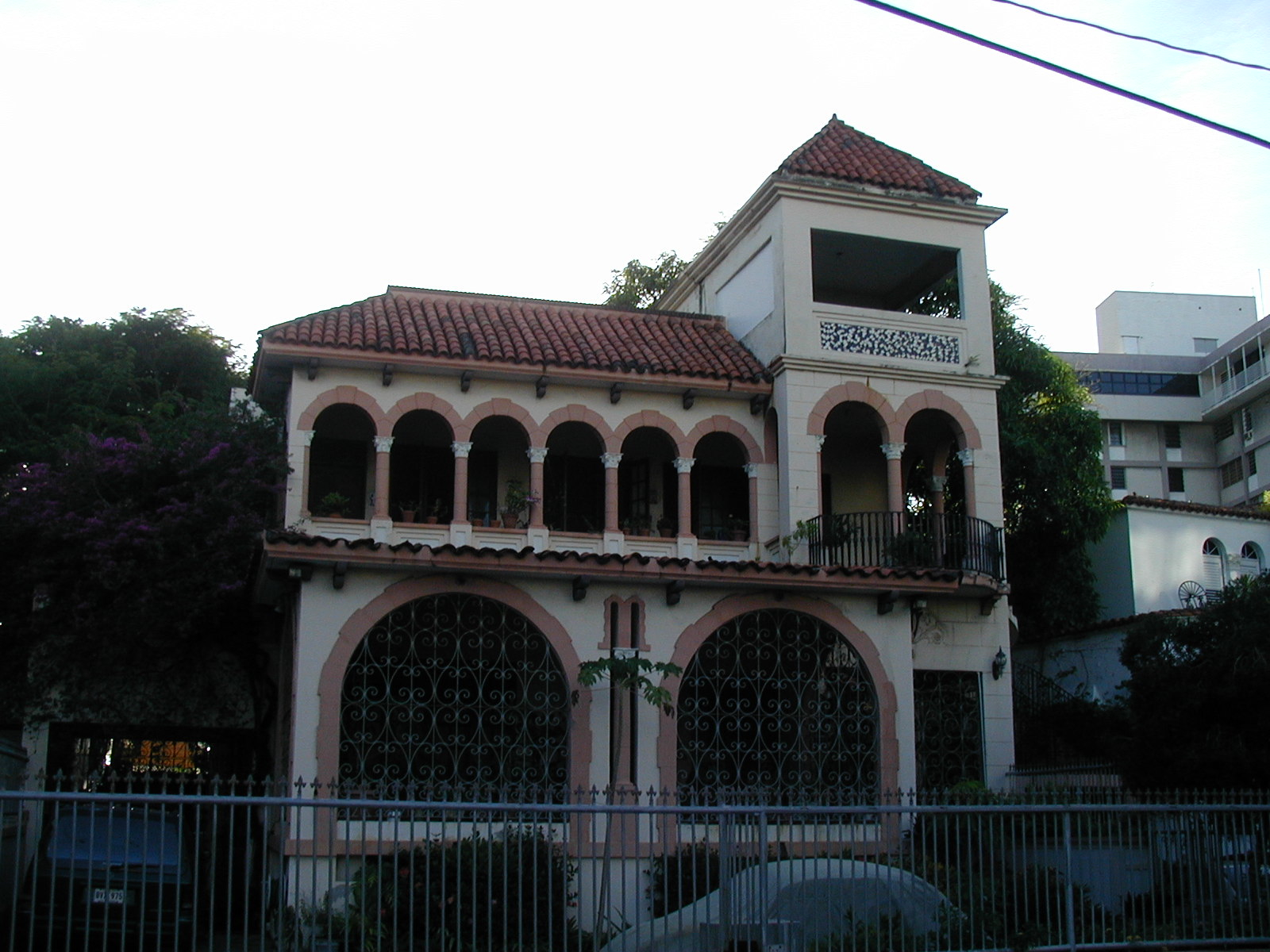
Spanish-style home in Miramar

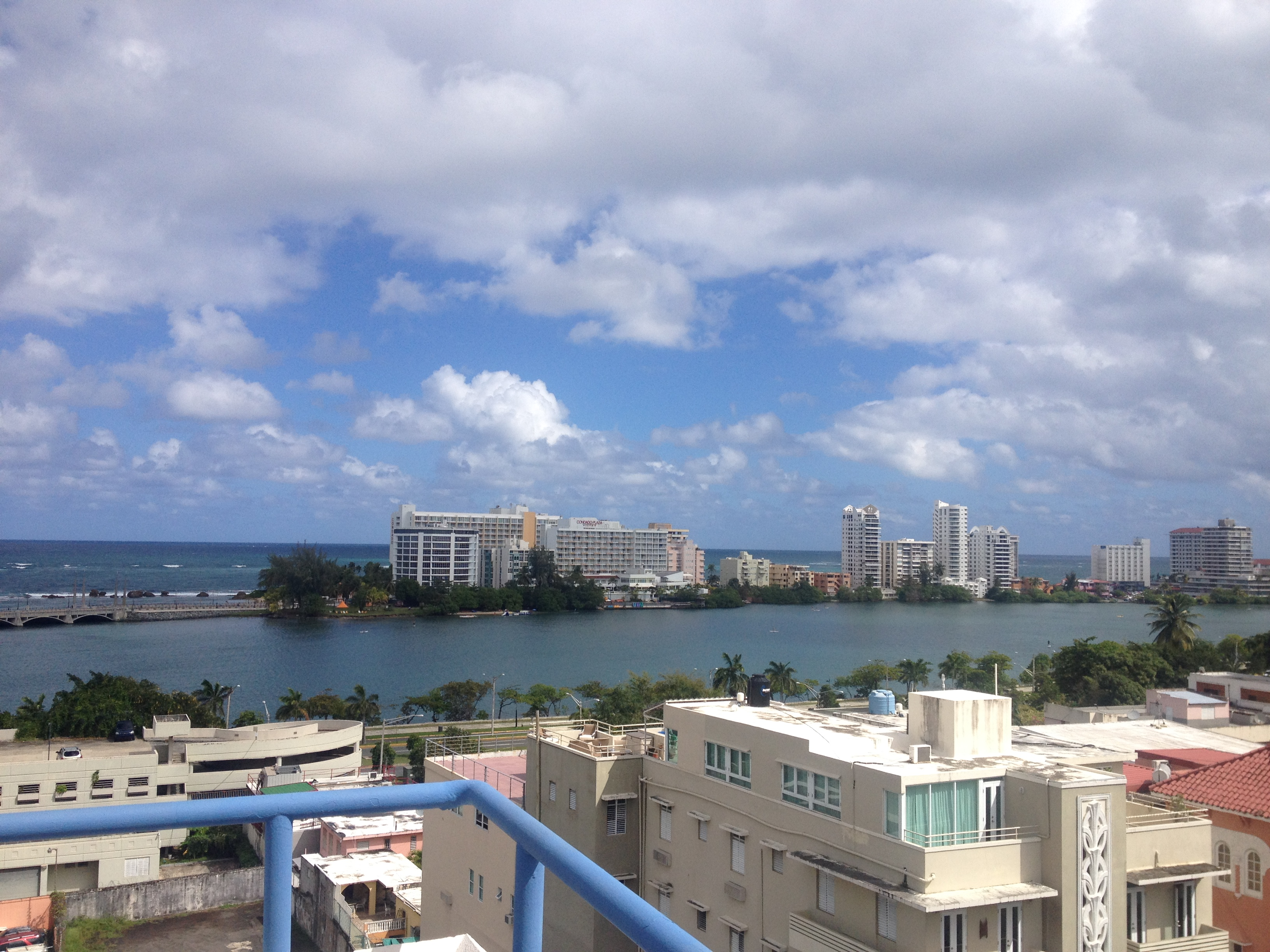
View of Miramar

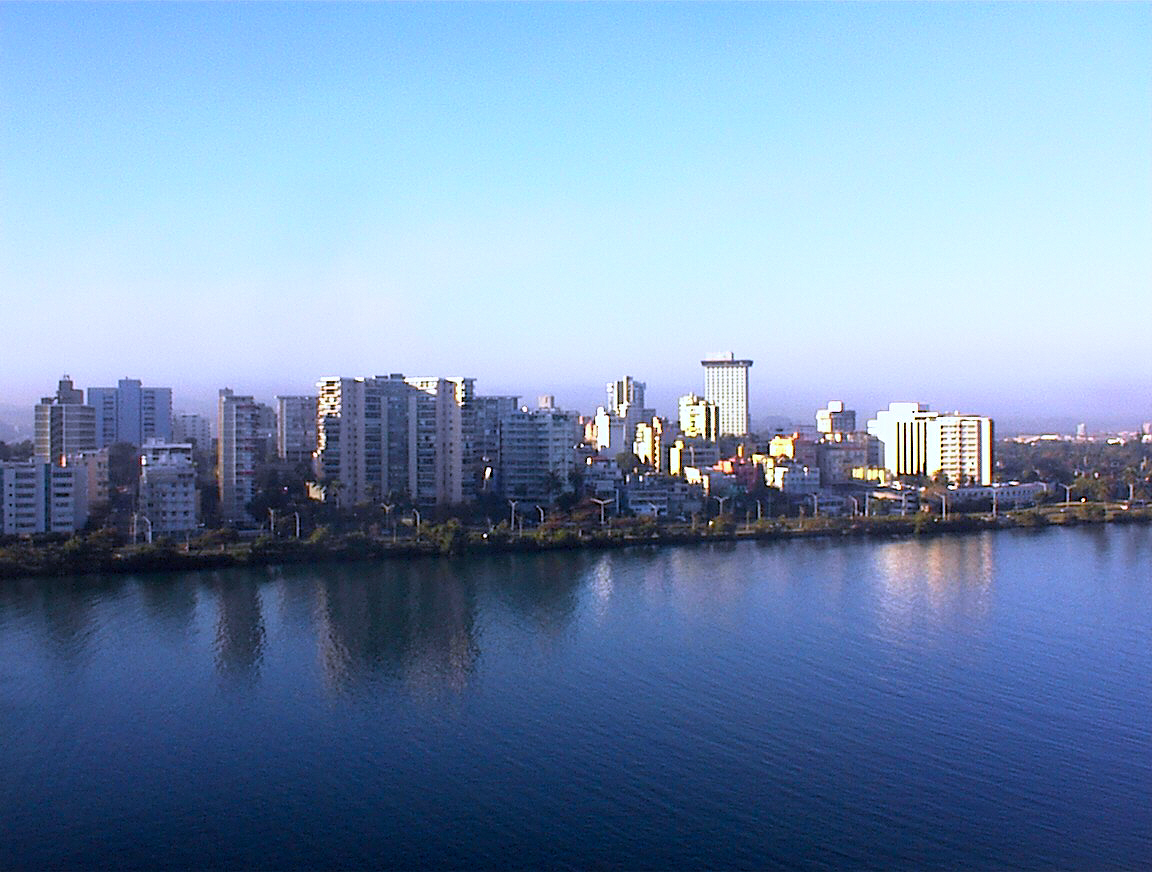
View of Miramar from a Condado building terrace

== See also ==
- List of communities in Puerto Rico
