= Preston Central Methodist Church =

Church in Lancashire, England

Coordinates: 53.7585°N 2.7032°W

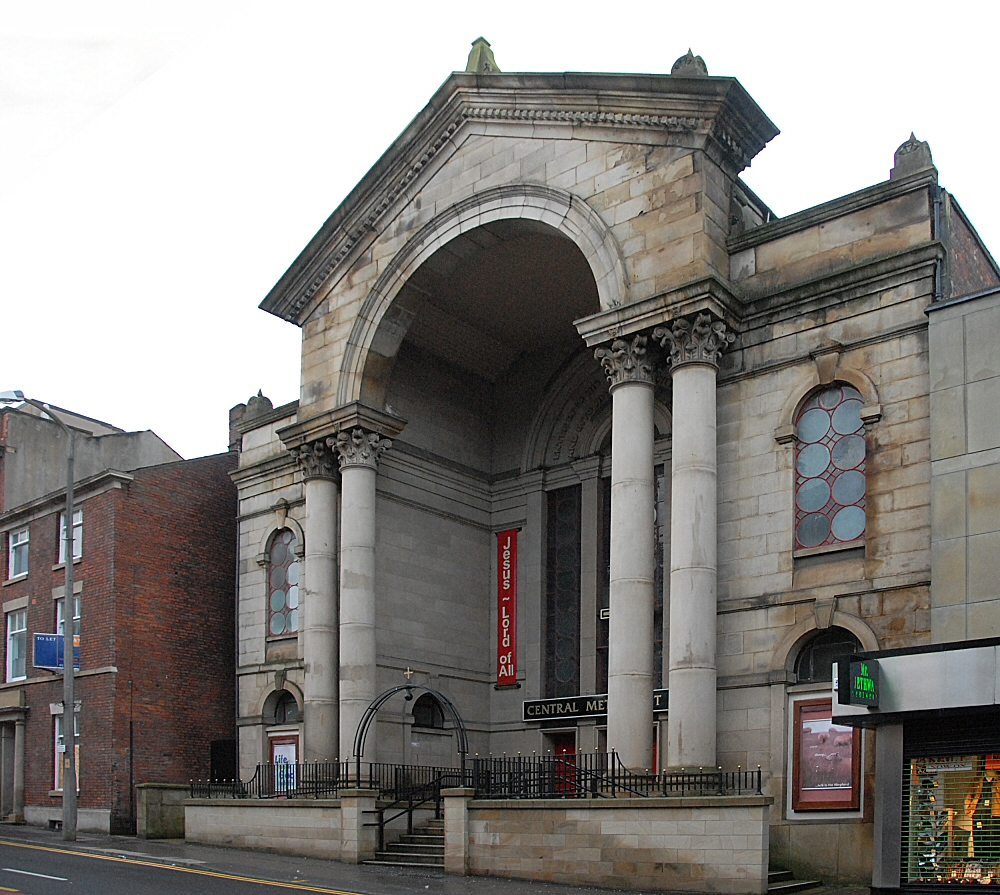
- Lune Street entrance

- Location in Preston
- OS grid reference: SD 537 294
- Location: Lune Street, Preston, Lancashire
- Country: England
- Denomination: Methodist Church of Great Britain
- Website: Preston Central Methodist Church

History
- Former name: Preston Central Wesleyan Methodist Church

Architecture
- Functional status: Active
- Heritage designation: Grade II
- Designated: 27 September 1979
- Architect(s): Poulton and Woodman (remodelling)
- Architectural type: Church
- Groundbreaking: 1817
- Completed: 1818 with further alterations in 1863
- Construction cost: £6,000

Specifications
- Materials: Brick, sandstone façade, slate roof

Administration
- District: Lancashire

Preston Central Methodist Church is in Lune Street, Preston, Lancashire, England. It is an active Methodist church in the Preston Ribble Methodist Circuit, and the Lancashire district. The church is recorded in the National Heritage List for England as a designated Grade II listed building.

== History ==
The church was built in 1817 as a Wesleyan Methodist chapel. It cost £6,000, and was one of the first public buildings in the country to be lit by gas. It was remodelled in 1862–63 by Poulton and Woodman. In the 1990s a hall in the church was converted into sleeping accommodation for the poor and homeless, and the entrance area was enlarged, allowing for the creation of a coffee shop, kitchen, crèche, and toilets. Improvements were made in the access to the front of the church in 2006.

== Architecture ==
=== Exterior ===
The church is built in brick, with a front of sandstone ashlar and a slate roof. It has a rectangular plan, is in two storeys, and is sited at right angles to the street. The symmetrical entrance front faces east and contains a giant round-headed arch carried on two pairs of Corinthian columns. The surround of the arch is moulded, and above it is a moulded dentilled gable. At the top of the columns are moulded cornices, which are carried out over the lateral bays. These bays contain two round-headed windows with imposts and keystones, one in each storey. The lower windows are partly blocked with notice boards, and the upper windows contain circular geometric glazing. Under the arch, steps lead up to a recessed porch with doorways and a Venetian window. Along the sides of the church are two tiers of round-headed windows. At the rear of the church is a two-storey extension with gabled porches and round-headed doorways with fanlights.

=== Interior ===
Inside the church is a horseshoe-shaped gallery carried on thin cast iron columns with Ionic caps, and with a foliated balustrade. The ceiling is coffered with glazed panels in the centre. The original pipe organ was built by Gray and Davison and had two manuals. This was replaced in 1881 by a three-manual organ built by W. E. Richardson.

== See also ==
- Listed buildings in Preston, Lancashire
- List of Methodist churches
