= Barratt's Chapel =

Historic church in Delaware, United States

- U.S. National Register of Historic Places
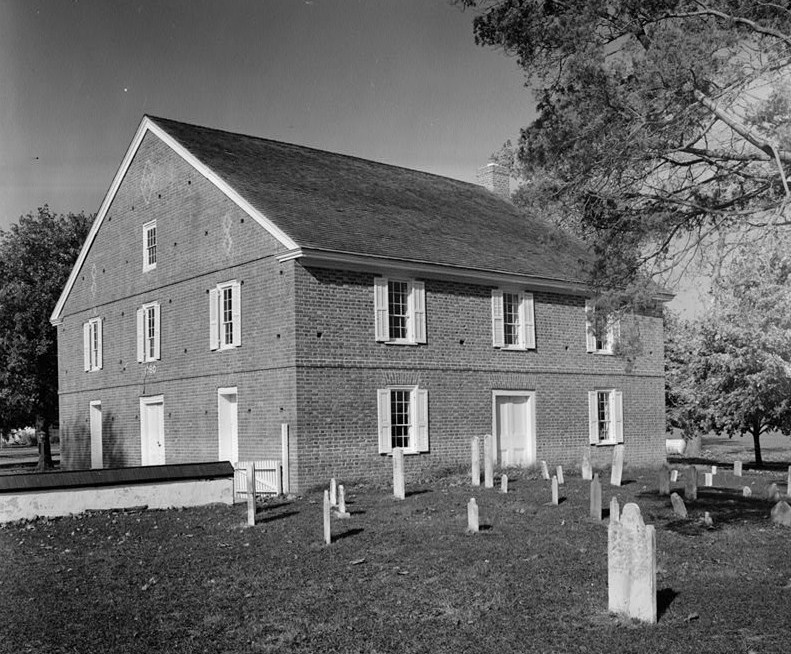
- Barratt's Chapel in 1982

- Location within Delaware Location within the United States
- Nearest city: Frederica, Delaware
- Coordinates: 39°1′28.6″N 75°27′34.36″W
- Built: 1780
- NRHP reference No.: 72000281
- Added to NRHP: October 10, 1972

Barratt's Chapel is a chapel located to the north of Frederica in Kent County, Delaware. It was built in 1780 on land donated by Philip Barratt, owner of Barratt Hall, and a prominent local landowner and political figure. Barratt, who had recently become a Methodist, wanted to build a center for the growing Methodist movement in Delaware.

== History ==
Barratt's Chapel is the oldest surviving church building in the United States built by and for Methodists, but it earns its title as the "Cradle of Methodism" because of what happened there in 1784.

Methodism began in England as a movement within the Church of England led by John and Charles Wesley. As members of the Methodist Societies emigrated to the American colonies, Methodism took root in the New World.

Between 1768 and 1774, John Wesley sent Francis Asbury and seven other Methodist lay preachers to the colonies to minister to the growing societies. When the American Revolutionary War broke out, only Asbury and James Dempster chose to remain in America. Dempster withdrew to a farm in the Mohawk Valley of upstate New York, where he remained for the rest of his life, preaching occasionally in the surrounding area. Asbury became the effective leader of American Methodists.

In 1784, with peace returned, John Wesley sent his friend Thomas Coke to America with instructions to find Asbury and to discuss with him the future of American Methodism. Coke came to Barratt's Chapel on Sunday, November 14, 1784, expecting to find Asbury. As Wesley's personal emissary, Coke was invited to preach. During the sermon Asbury arrived. Coke came down from the pulpit and embraced him. A star in the floor of the Chapel commemorates this historic meeting. During this service the sacraments of baptism and Holy Communion were administered for the first time by ordained Methodist clergy.

Following the service, Coke and Asbury adjourned to the home of Philip Barratt's widow, across the field from the Chapel. That evening they formulated plans to call all the Methodist preachers together for a meeting in Baltimore on Christmas Day. At this Christmas Conference of 1784, the Methodist Episcopal Church was organized.

The Chapel as it appears from the outside today looks very much the way it did when Coke and Asbury met there. The interior of the Chapel has undergone several renovations. The present appearance dates from 1842.

Barratt's Chapel is an officially designated Heritage Landmark of the United Methodist Church. Today it is owned and maintained by the Commission on Archives and History of the Peninsula-Delaware Annual Conference of the United Methodist Church. Several thousand people visit the Chapel each year. The Commission sponsors two major services each year at the Chapel: the Anniversary Service on the second Sunday of November, commemorating the meeting of Coke and Asbury, and a Christmas Carol Service on a Sunday in December. The Chapel is also used for many weddings, baptisms, funerals, and other special services.

It was listed on the National Register of Historic Places in 1972.

== Barratt's Chapel Museum ==
The Barratt's Chapel Museum features original furniture, religious books and artifacts about the history of Methodism on the Delmarva Peninsula. There is also a video about the history of Barratt's. Guests can tour the original chapel and a reconstructed 18th century vestry. The chapel and museum are open on Saturdays and Sundays.

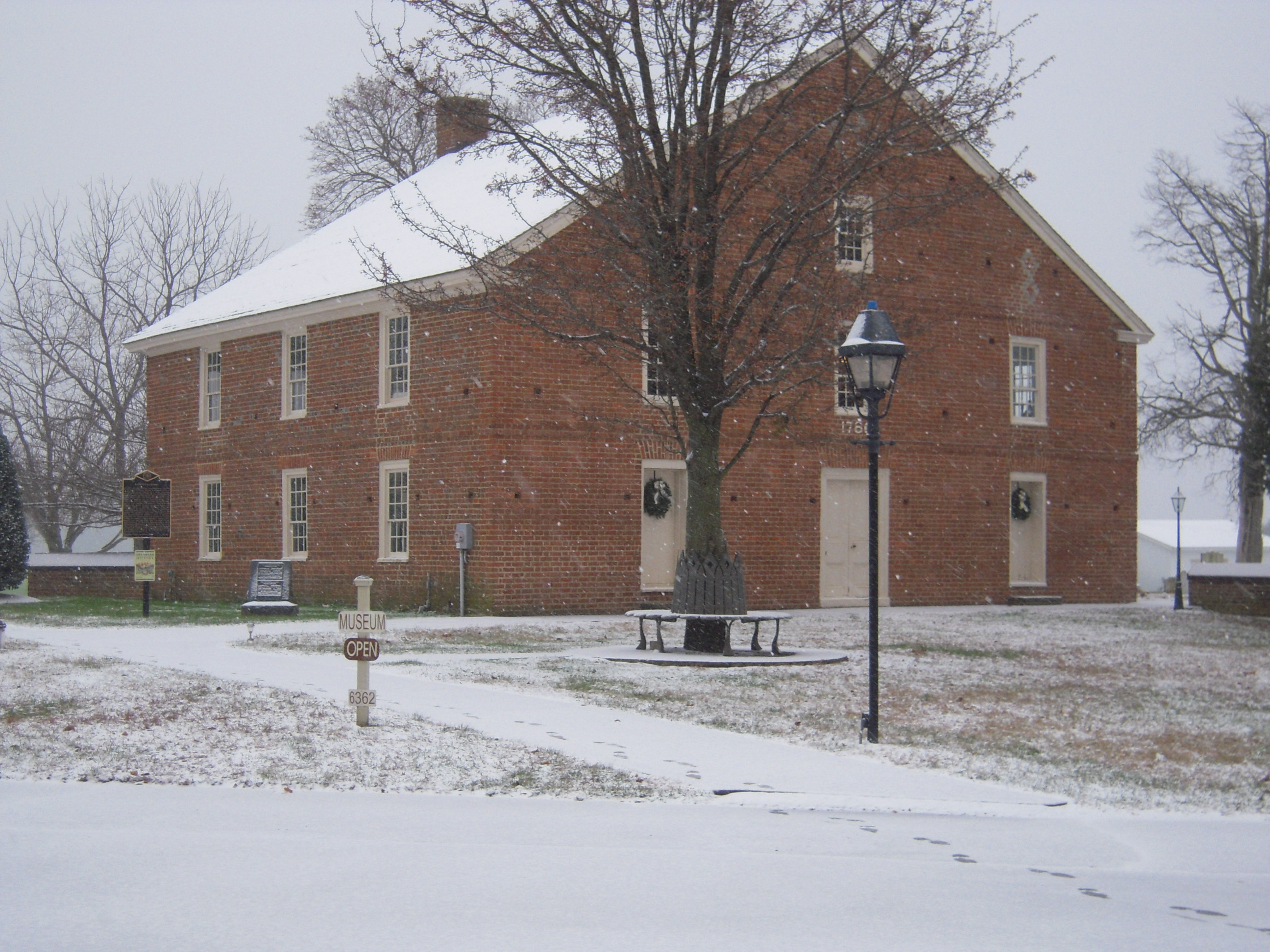
Barratt's Chapel in winter

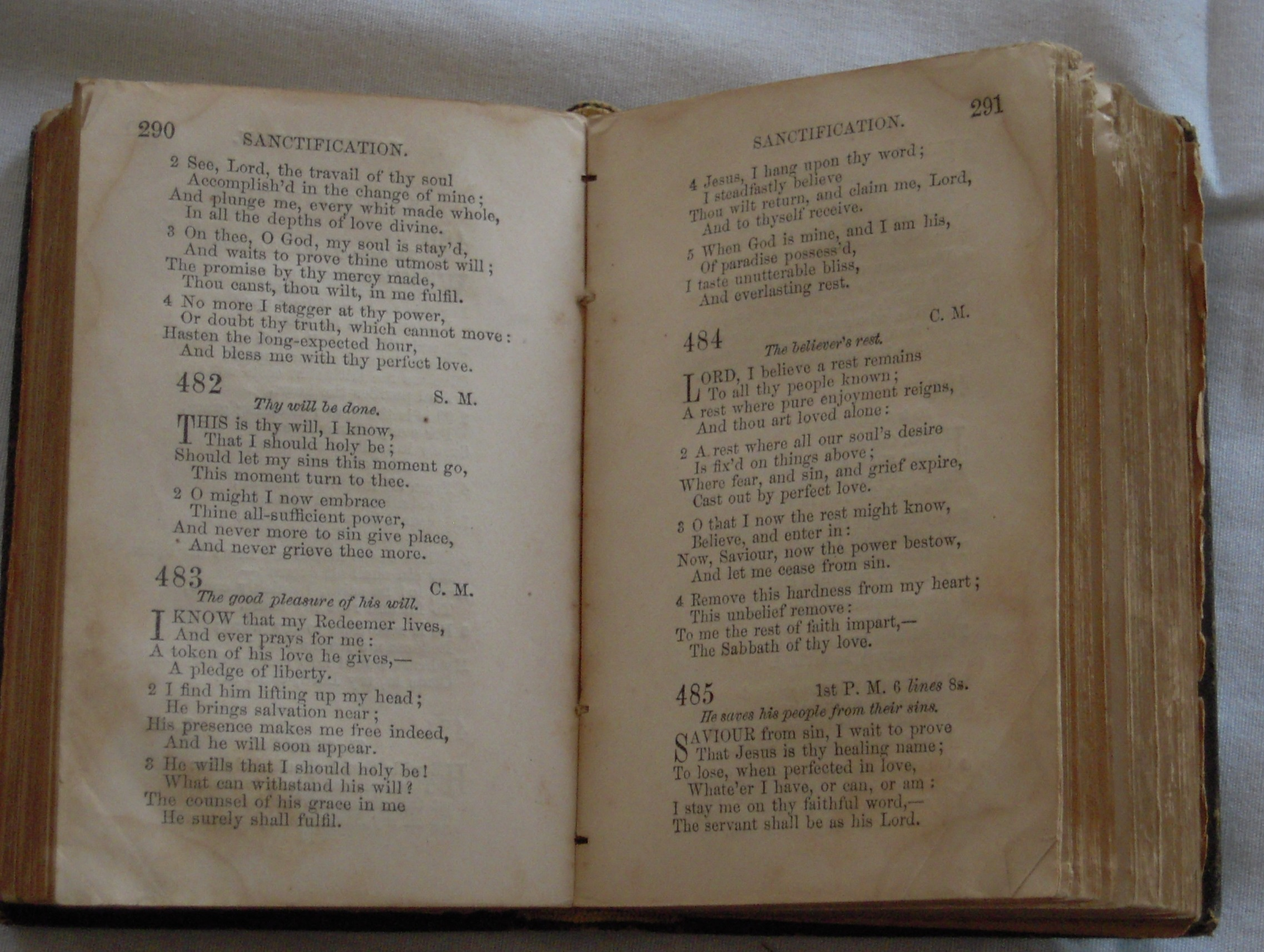
Nineteenth Century Methodist Hymnal

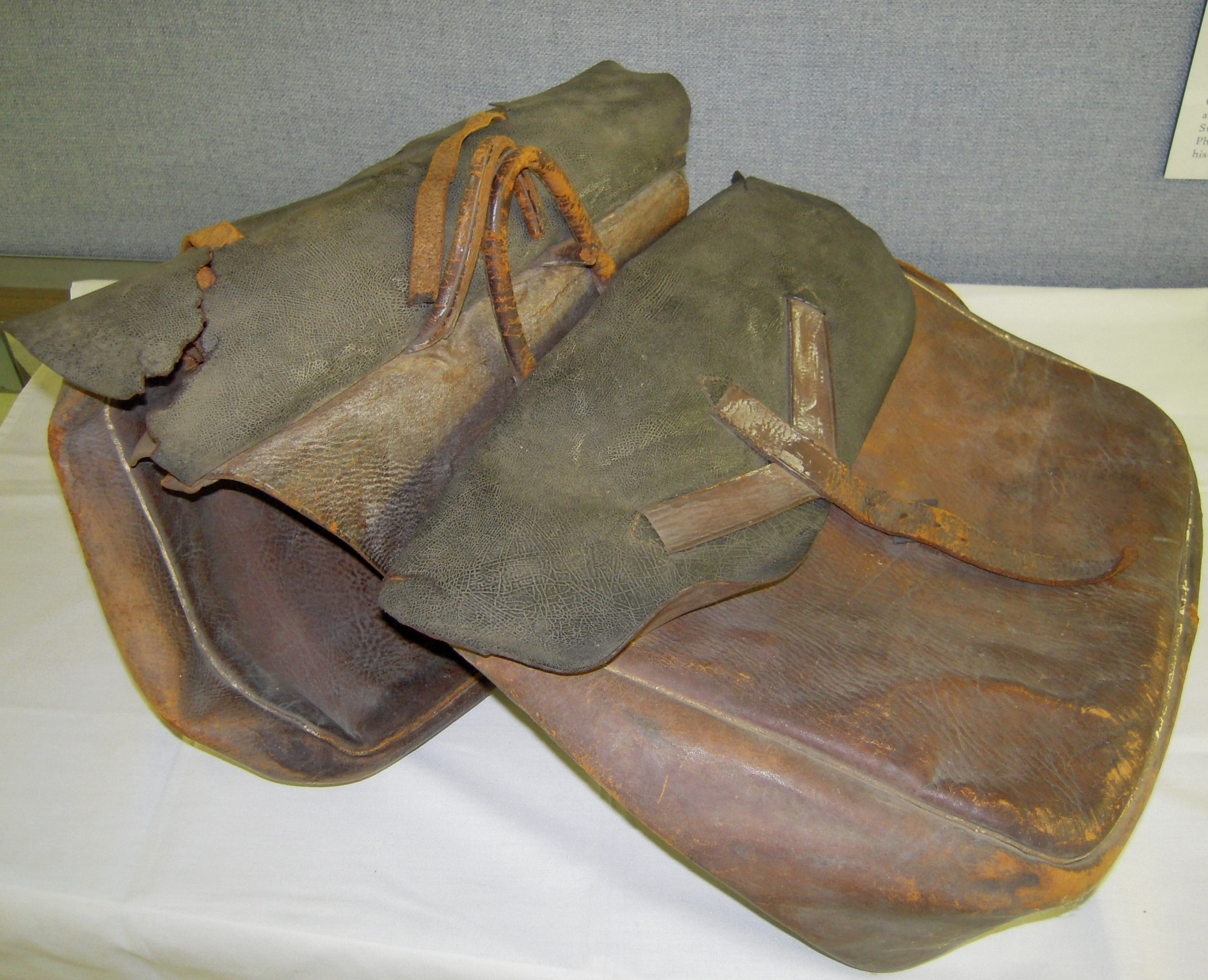
Nineteenth Century Saddlebags

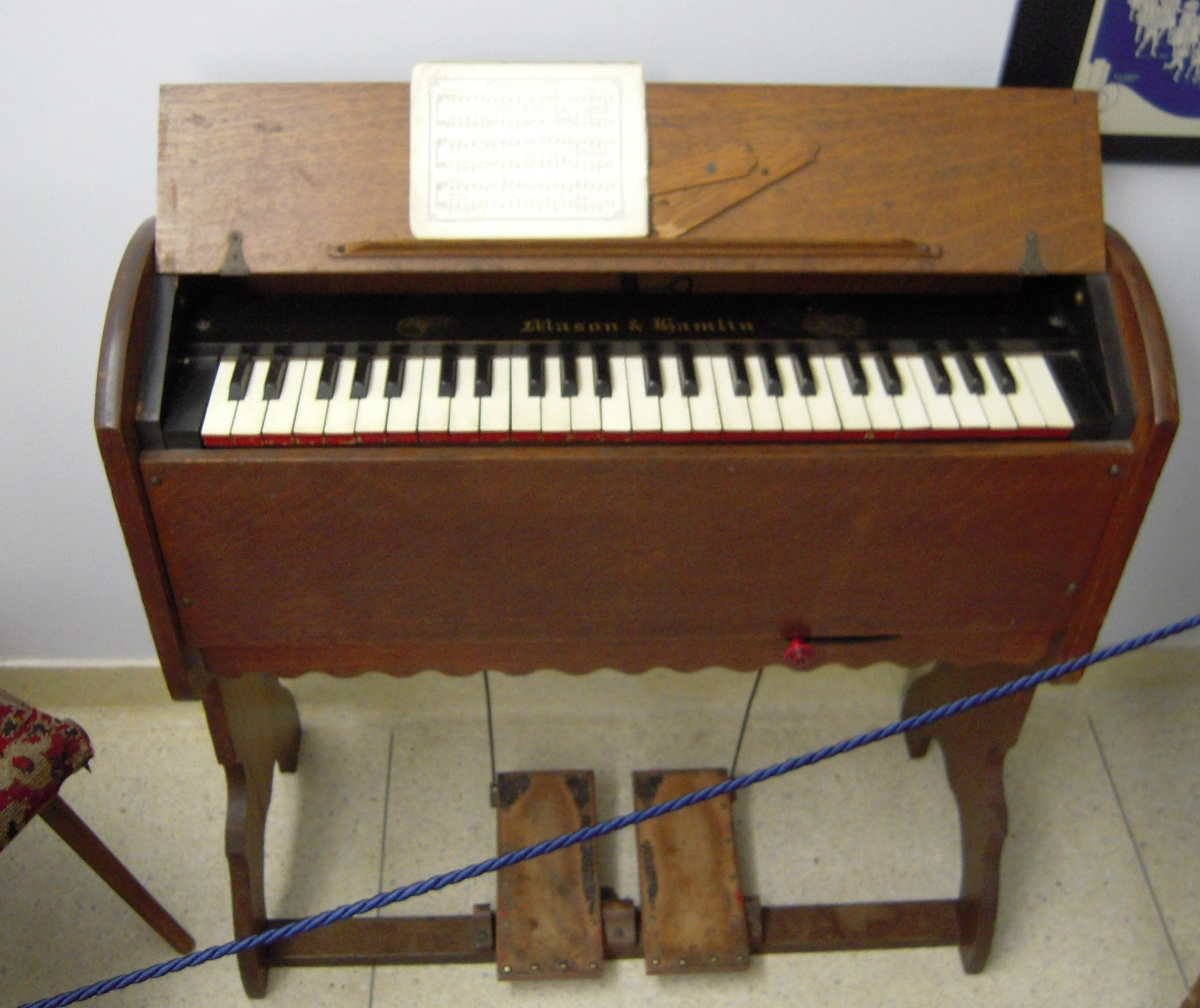
Sunday School Organ

== See also ==
- List of the oldest buildings in Delaware
- Oldest churches in the United States
