= Primera Iglesia Metodista Unida de Ponce =

Historic church in Ponce, Puerto Rico

- Missionary Society of the Methodist Episcopal Church
- U.S. National Register of Historic Places
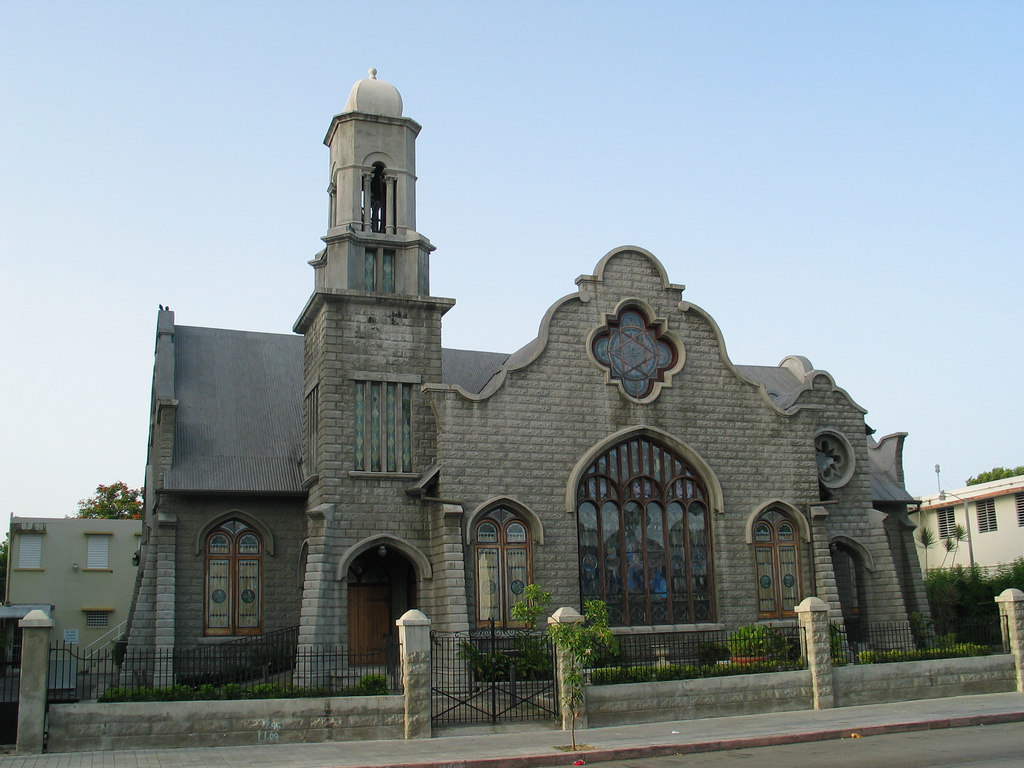
- First United Methodist Church in Ponce, Puerto Rico

- Location within Puerto Rico
- Location: Calle Villa 135, Ponce, Puerto Rico
- Coordinates: 18°00′37″N 66°36′58″W
- Area: less than one acre
- Built: 1907
- Architect: Antonin Nechodoma
- Architectural style: Synthesis of Neo-Gothic, Spanish Revival, Spanish Baroque, and Byzantine elements.
- NRHP reference No.: 87001822
- Added to NRHP: 29 October 1987

The Primera Iglesia Metodista Unida de Ponce (English: First United Methodist Church of Ponce. Officially, Missionary Society of the Methodist Episcopal Church) was the first structure erected in Puerto Rico by the celebrated architect Antonin Nechodoma. Constructed in 1907, the building houses a Methodist congregation and is located on Villa street in Ponce, Puerto Rico, in the city's historic district. The structure was listed on the U.S. National Register of Historic Places on 29 October 1987.

== Background ==
Under the Spanish colonial government (1508 - 1898) religious worship in Puerto Rico was prohibited in other than Catholic churches. With the 1898 change in sovereignty from the Spaniards to the Americans, Protestant churches began to be built. Now (2019) known as Primera Iglesia Metodista La Resurrección, this church was built in 1907 on land that was previously owned by the Vendrell Toro family, a prominent family in Ponce. In 1962 the church served as the first site of the Interamerican University of Puerto Rico at Ponce, until more spacious quarters were established at the intersection of Calle Estrella and Calle Castillo. Today (2019) the church continuous to hold regular worship services. The building is open, free of charge, Tuesday to Friday mornings for the general public; Saturday visits are possible if arrangements are made in advanced.

== Physical appearance ==
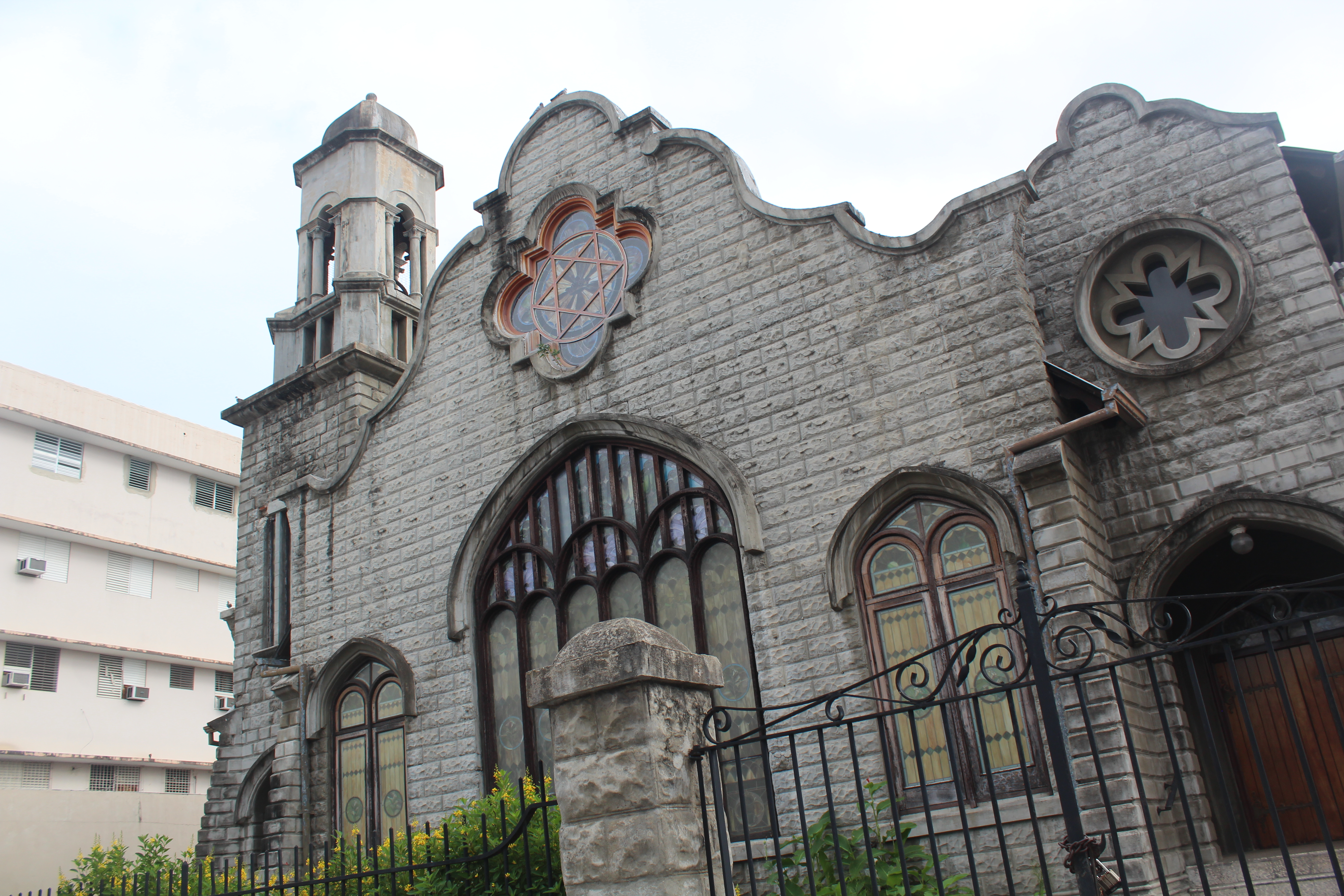
North facade of the building

The First United Methodist Church of Ponce is a magnificent example of early 20th-century eclecticism, integrating Neo-Gothic, Spanish Revival, Spanish Baroque, and byzantine elements. It is constructed entirely of rusticated, reinforced-concrete with gabled wood and corrugated sheet metal roofs. In volume, the church consists of a gabled single-nave, parallel to the street and subdivided into three sections. A large, central cross-gable creates the main facade at Calle Villa, facing north.

On Calle Villa, the cross-gable is articulated by a Spanish-baroque style rope pediment. Flanking this gabled, central transept are two square-plan towers, a shorter turret on the west and a taller bell-tower on the east, both resting upon the intersections of the main nave and cross-gable. The main gable is divided into three bays: a wide, central bay with a large, wide, four-centered gothic arch stained-glass window and two flanking bays with similar but smaller and narrower stained-glass windows. Above the central bay, a stained glass Spanish-renaissance oculus (consisting of a square with semicircular projections at each of its four sides) occupies the area within the pediment.

The east bell-tower consists of a two-story rusticated base and step-backs to an onion-shaped cupola above the belfry. At the ground level, an entry vestibule is created by an open, four-centered archway. At the second story, still within the tower's rusticated base-section, a series of four narrow, stained-glass strip windows provide a distinct, modernist, element. The first segment of the step-backs of the tower contains two smaller strip windows, and the following, taller set-back houses the church-bell behind narrow arches, one on each of the four sides, supported by Corinthian columns. The onion-cupola caps the composition.

The smaller, west tower is completely rusticated and terminates in a rope pediment, at a level slightly lower than the base of the opposite tower. At the ground level there is a vestibule similar to that of the other tower and above, a circular opening with an oculus within. The main nave extends only one bay beyond the towers. These bays are identical to the smaller stained-glass bays of the main gable. A series of low buttresses supports all major walls, one at each extreme of. each wall. The side gables of the main nave repeat, exactly, the articulation of the facade of the main cross-gable.

A rusticated concrete and wrought-iron gate surrounds the property, articulated by square pillars at approximately 20 foot intervals, and spanned by an approximately 2 foot high rusticated concrete base and bar-like wrought-iron railings above.

== Significance ==
The Missionary Society of the Methodist Episcopal Church of Ponce is a very good example of Antonin Nechodoma's religious architecture. This Czech architect was one of the first non-Hispanic designers to work in Puerto Rico. A colleague of Frank Lloyd Wright under Louis Sullivan in Chicago, Nechodoma developed the Puerto Rican Bungalow style for residential housing, which spread rapidly throughout the Island during the 1920s and 1930s. Nechodoma was the architect of at least three Protestant churches and many magnificent prairie-style upper-class residences. Most of Nechodoma's buildings have been demolished because of later developments. Most of his surviving structures are now considered landmarks.

Nechodoma designed his projects between 1907 and 1928. As the original plans of the church are dated 1907, historians believe that the Methodist Episcopal Church of Ponce was the first structure erected in Puerto Rico by the celebrated architect.

The materials used to construct the church are of importance in the history of construction in Puerto Rico. Reinforced concrete, the principal material, was seldom, if at all, used at this early date in Puerto Rico. Contemporary concrete buildings exhibited a lack of understanding of the then-new material, evidenced by extremely thick walls and excessive use of iron beams (traditional means of construction were applied to modern materials). These characteristics are not found in the construction of this building. Nechodoma used the concrete in an elegant and even decorative fashion, demonstrating his knowledge of North-American construction techniques and his distance from the local building customs. The building looks as if it is made of stone and not concrete.

This church is also important in Puerto Rico's religious history, as it was one of the first non-Roman Catholic churches built after the change of sovereignty in 1898, when the United States established rule. Until then, the only non-Catholic church allowed by Spanish colonial authorities to practice in Puerto Rico had been the Anglican church, organized by British residents. The Methodist Church is an example of the freedom of worship instated after the United States occupation of the island. State Historian Felix Julian del Campo and State Architectural Historian Hector F. Santiago consider it the most prominent non-Catholic structure in the city of Ponce.

== See also ==
- McCabe Memorial Church: also in Ponce, Puerto Rico
- National Register of Historic Places listings in southern Puerto Rico
