= Antonin Nechodoma =

Czech-American architect (1877–1928)

- Born: Antonín Nedochoma; 1877; Prague, Bohemia, Austria-Hungary
- Died: 1928 (aged 50–51); Puerto Rico
- Occupation: Architect
- Buildings: Missionary Society of the Methodist Episcopal Church (Ponce, PR); Casa Korber; Casa Roig; Georgetti Mansion
- Projects: The Market in San Pedro de Macoris

Antonin Nechodoma (1877–1928), was a Czech-American architect who practiced in Puerto Rico and Dominican Republic from 1905 to 1928. He is known for the introduction of the Prairie Style to the Caribbean and the integration of Arts and Crafts elements to his architecture. Nechodoma designed in such style at the historical district of Miramar, Puerto Rico where the town preserves his creation.

== Biography ==
Antonin Nechodoma was born in Prague, Bohemia, Austria-Hungary in 1877. In 1887, Nechodoma's family emigrated to Chicago where he worked as a contractor. In 1905, Nechodoma, already an architect, arrived in Puerto Rico after working for a short period in Florida. In Puerto Rico (1905–1928), Nechodoma became one of the most prominent architects in the Caribbean. His work included private and public buildings: banks, schools, markets, churches and houses. His practice extended to the Dominican Republic where he built the main 'glorieta' in the Parque Independencia in Santo Domingo and the Market in San Pedro de Macoris.

Nechodoma's architectural style varied widely, from Neoclassical style for public school buildings, Gothic and Mission Style for his churches, and Prairie Style in his houses. There was some controversy surrounding his plagiarism of Frank Lloyd Wright's residential work. Architectural historians Jorge Rigau, Enrique Vivoni Farage, and Nechodoma's biographer, Thomas Marvel discussed Nechodoma's direct use of Wright's Wasmuth Portfolio as a reference for his residential work in Puerto Rico.

Despite the controversy, Nechodoma made significant contributions to the architecture of Puerto Rico and the Caribbean. His integration of arts and crafts motifs to his architecture, ranging from furniture design, ironwork, stained glass, and mosaics, had an enormous influence in the Caribbean architecture of the early 20th century. His prolific production left a wealth of first class public buildings in both the Dominican Republic and Puerto Rico, notable because of their technical innovations and their contribution toward forming a language of tropical architecture in the Caribbean. Nechodoma's work was published extensively during his lifetime. He also published in 1927 an important article on architecture in Puerto Rico entitled "Concerning Architecture in Puerto Rico".

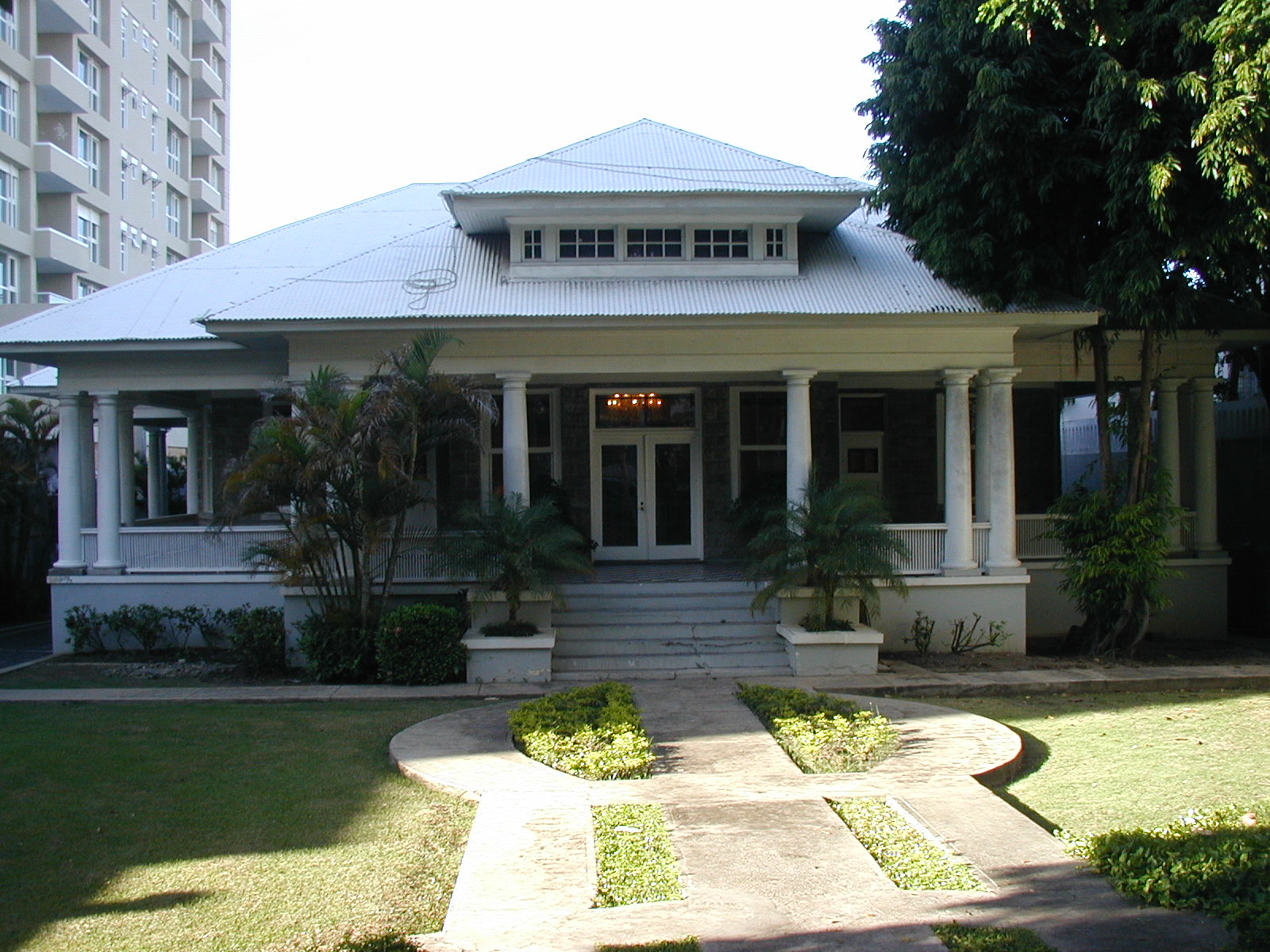
Building by Antonin Nechodoma in Miramar (Puerto Rico)

Nechodoma died in a car crash in 1928.

== Notable works ==
- Our Lady of Lourdes Chapel (1908) Santurce, Puerto Rico
- Missionary Society of the Methodist Episcopal Church (1907) Ponce, Puerto Rico
- Casa Korber (1917) Miramar, Puerto Rico
- Casa Roig (1919) Humacao, Puerto Rico
- Georgetti Mansion (1923) Santurce, Puerto Rico
- Casa Dr. Eugenio Fernández Garcia (Same period) Miramar, Puerto Rico
- Baluarte del Conde, redesigned in 1912, Santo Domingo, Dominican Republic
- Roman Catholic Diocese of San Pedro de Macorís, In 1902 started with plans and execution of prominent French engineer Monsieur Eduardo Garcia. In 1910 was initiated by the Engineer Nechodoma, after the death of French Eduardo Garcia, changing the original plans to make it in concrete and masonry not as first thought.
- McCabe Memorial Church (1908), Ponce, Puerto Rico

== Antonin Nechodoma's Papers ==
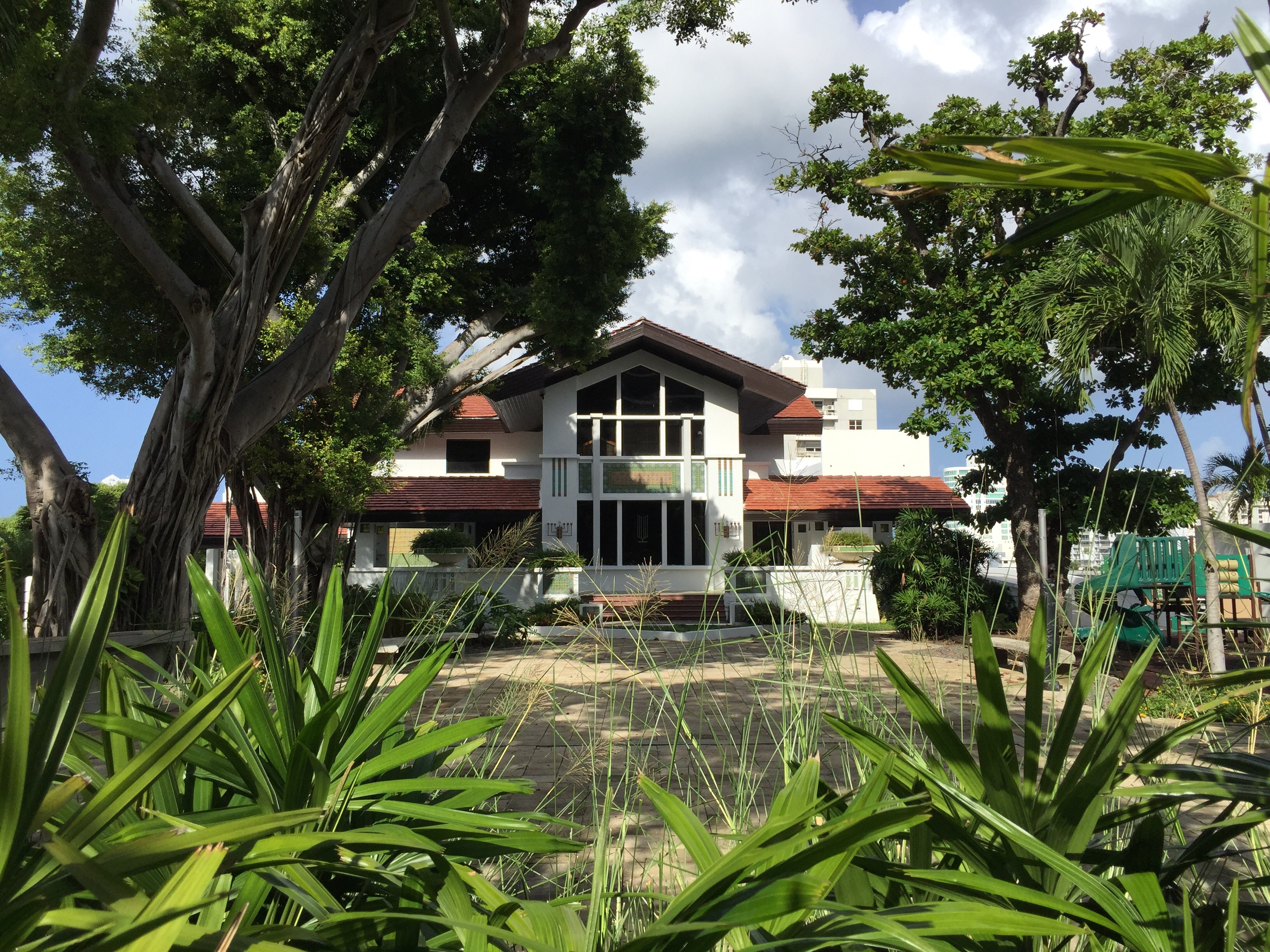
Casa Korber built in 1917 in Miramar

The Architecture and Construction Archives at the University of Puerto Rico (AACUPR) holds the Antonin Nechodoma Collection (1906-1992). Approximately four cubic feet in size, the collection contains architectural drawings, photographs, artifacts, and textual documents. The Architectural Drawings Series holds 20 projects organized chronologically. The documents were transferred to the School of Architecture’s Library in 1986.
