= National Register of Historic Places listings in San Juan, Puerto Rico =

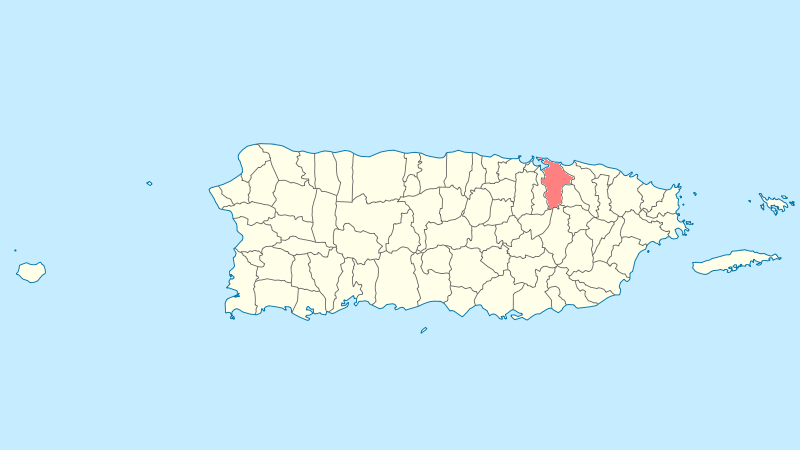
National Register entries listed below are found in San Juan municipality, highlighted here.

This portion of National Register of Historic Places listings in Puerto Rico covers the municipality of San Juan.

Names of places given are as appear in the National Register, reflecting name as given in NRHP application at the date of listing. Note, the National Register name system does not accommodate Spanish á, ñ and other letters.

This National Park Service list is complete through NPS recent listings posted May 29, 2026.

== Current listings ==
	Name on the Register	Image	Date listed	Location	Barrio	Description
1	Acueducto de San Juan	Acueducto de San Juan	June 21, 2007 (#07000585)	Flamboyán St. 18°23′21″N 66°03′32″W	El Cinco	Spanish-built waterworks from 1846 that was integral for the development of Río Piedras, includes an aqueduct, filtration plant and hydrological structures that make use of the nearby Piedras River.
2	Administration Building	Administration Building	October 26, 1983 (#83004195)	University of the Sacred Heart campus, Rosales and San Antonio Sts. 18°26′33″N 66°03′32″W	Santurce	University of the Sacred Heart administration building and chapel built in a Classical Revival style in 1906. Also known as Portico and Chapel of the Sacred Heart University.
3	Antiguo Casino de Puerto Rico	Antiguo Casino de Puerto Rico	September 22, 1977 (#77001554)	1 Ponce de León Ave. 18°27′58″N 66°06′41″W	San Juan Antiguo	Beaux Arts casino building from 1917, used as an officers' club, music school, cultural headquarters, reception hall and event venue by the United States Army and the government of Puerto Rico throughout its history.
4	Biblioteca Carnegie	Biblioteca Carnegie	October 20, 1983 (#83004196)	Ponce de León Ave., Puerta de Tierra; 18°27′59″N 66°06′31″W	San Juan Antiguo	Classical Revival Carnegie library building from 1915 that was the first purpose-built library in the territory.
5	Hiram Bithorn Municipal Stadium	Hiram Bithorn Municipal Stadium	January 22, 2014 (#13001118)	Franklin Delano Roosevelt Ave. 18°25′00″N 66°04′23″W	Hato Rey Norte	Ballpark from 1962 designed by Pedro Miranda and built to replace the smaller Sixto Escobar Stadium. In addition to serving as an event and concert venue, it has also served as the territory's national stadium and hosted the 1979 Pan American Games.
6	El Capitolio de Puerto Rico	El Capitolio de Puerto Rico	November 18, 1977 (#77001555)	Ponce de León and Muñoz Rivera Avenues; 18°28′00″N 66°06′21″W	San Juan Antiguo	The seat of government of Puerto Rico, a Classical Revival / Beaux Arts building from 1929, designed by Rafael Carmoega and inspired by the Low Memorial Library from Columbia University. Often referred to as the Palace of the Laws (Palacio de las Leyes).
7	Carcel de Puerta de Tierra (Note: The name of the Carcel de Puerta de Tierra is presented here without the accent on "Cárcel" in conformance with the usage in the building's National Register nomination form and Federal Register announcement of listing.)	Carcel de Puerta de Tierra	August 11, 1976 (#76002253)	Ponce de León Ave., Stop 8, Puerta de Tierra; 18°27′49″N 66°05′32″W	San Juan Antiguo	Spanish Neoclassical building from 1887 that has functioned as a prison, a Bacardi factory and public library. Today it hosts the Puerto Rico General Archives.
8	Casa Dr. Bailey K. Ashford	Casa Dr. Bailey K. Ashford	September 16, 2022 (#100008175)	1312 Ashford Ave. 18°27′18″N 66°04′10″W	Santurce	Historic house and former residence of physician and Nobel Prize in Medicine nominee Bailey Ashford, former member of the Puerto Rico School of Tropical Medicine and founder of the Puerto Rico Anemia Commission.
9	Casa de España	Casa de España	July 5, 1983 (#83002294)	Ponce de León Ave. 18°27′59″N 66°06′29″W	San Juan Antiguo	Exotic / Moorish Revival house from 1932, designed by Pedro Adolfo de Castro for a private Spanish-Puerto Rican social club. It includes a replica of the Court of the Lions from the Alhambra.
10	Casa Gonzalez Cuyar	Casa Gonzalez Cuyar	March 4, 2024 (#100010033)	#225 Calle del Parque; 18°26′50″N 66°03′51″W		
11	Casa Klumb	Casa Klumb	November 14, 1997 (#97001307)	1 Ramón B. López Ave. 18°23′58″N 66°02′06″W	Oriente	Modernist home from 1947 designed and lived by Henry Klumb until his death. It was destroyed by a fire in 2020.
12	Casa Dra. Concha Meléndez Ramírez	Casa Dra. Concha Meléndez Ramírez	June 30, 2011 (#11000414)	1400 Vilá Mayo St., at Manuel Rodríguez Serra St. 18°27′10″N 66°04′02″W	Santurce	Longtime home of writer, educator and first female member of the Puerto Rican Academy of Languages Concha Meléndez. The house itself is notable for its 1930s Spanish Colonial Revival architecture. Also a National Historic Landmark.
13	Casa Vigil	Casa Vigil	July 23, 2018 (#100002694)	1018 Calle Ferrocarril; 18°24′00″N 66°02′59″W	Pueblo	Historic vernacular residence from the late-19th century representative of the last wooden houses in the city before the construction trends shifted to concrete.
14	Central High School	Central High School	August 4, 1987 (#87001309)	Ponce de León Ave. 18°26′53″N 66°04′11″W	Santurce	Spanish Renaissance-inspired building from 1925.
15	Church of San Mateo de Cangrejos of Santurce	Church of San Mateo de Cangrejos of Santurce	January 2, 1985 (#85000044)	Corner of San Jorge St. and Eduardo Conde Ave. 18°26′40″N 66°03′48″W	Santurce	Historic 1832 parish church designed by Pedro Cobreros. Part of the Historic Churches of Puerto Rico MPS.
16	Church, School, Convent and Parish House of San Agustín	Church, School, Convent and Parish House of San Agustín	December 30, 1985 (#85003194)	265 Ponce de León Ave. 18°27′56″N 66°05′56″W	San Juan Antiguo	1915 concrete church and adjacent Augustinian convent and Catholic school located in the Puerta de Tierra Historic District.
17	Colegio de las Madres del Sagrado Corazón	Colegio de las Madres del Sagrado Corazón	November 25, 1985 (#85002908)	951 Ponce de León Ave. 18°27′15″N 66°04′46″W	Santurce	Former Catholic convent from 1880, now part of the Conservatory of Music of Puerto Rico.
18	Condado Vanderbilt Hotel	Condado Vanderbilt Hotel	November 25, 2005 (#08001110)	1055 Ashford Ave. 18°27′31″N 66°04′34″W	Santurce	Warren and Wetmore-designed Mission/Spanish Revival style hotel from 1919 that marked the beginning of the large-scale tourism industry in Puerto Rico.
19	Rafael Cordero Graded School	Rafael Cordero Graded School	November 19, 2020 (#100005816)	Calle Aurora Esq. Horae Prada 15; 18°27′04″N 66°04′51″W	Santurce	A historic vocational high school building.
20	Distrito Histórico del Viejo San Juan – Old San Juan Historic District	Distrito Histórico del Viejo San Juan – Old San Juan Historic District	October 10, 1972 (#72001553)	Northwest triangle of San Juan Islet; also roughly bounded by Muñoz Rivera and Ponce de León Avenues, Paseo de Covadonga, and J. A. Corretejer and Recinto Sur Streets; 18°27′58″N 66°06′55″W	San Juan Antiguo	Historic district that represents the oldest permanent European-established settlement in Puerto Rico and in the United States jurisdiction. Second set of boundaries represents a boundary increase of July 30, 2012 (#12000465). Designated a National Historic Landmark District on February 27, 2013 (#13000284).
21	Edificio Aboy	Edificio Aboy	September 28, 2001 (#01001069)	603 Aboy St. 18°27′15″N 66°04′51″W	Santurce	Art Deco building from 1937, also known as Le Faro, designed by Jorge Julia Pasarell.
22	Edificio Comunidad de Orgullo Gay de Puerto Rico	Edificio Comunidad de Orgullo Gay de Puerto Rico	May 2, 2016 (#16000237)	3 Saldaña St. 18°24′02″N 66°03′07″W	Pueblo	Mediterranean Revival apartment building and former LGBT community center located in downtown Río Piedras that historically represents the first organized attempt to confront discrimination against the local LGBTQ community.
23	Edificio del Valle	Edificio del Valle	November 20, 2004 (#04001243)	1118 Ponce de León Ave. 18°27′04″N 66°04′31″W	Santurce	Mixed-use Mission/Spanish Revival building from 1941, designed by Rafael Carmoega Morales.
24	Edificio Patio Español	Edificio Patio Español	February 18, 2005 (#05000061)	153 Cruz St. 18°27′57″N 66°06′58″W	San Juan Antiguo	Mission/Spanish Revival, Eclectic building from 1937, also known as La Filarmonica, designed by Eduardo Fossas López.
25	Edificio Victory Garden	Edificio Victory Garden	October 13, 2004 (#04001149)	1001 Ponce de León Ave., corner of Elisa Colberg St. 18°27′13″N 66°04′43″W	Santurce	Mission/Spanish Revival building from 1936, designed by Pedro Adolfo de Castro.
26	Escuela Brambaugh	Escuela Brambaugh	May 5, 1989 (#89000324)	San Juan Bautista St. and Ponce de León Ave. 18°27′55″N 66°05′44″W	San Juan Antiguo	From 1913, also known as Puerta de Tierra Public School.
27	Escuela Graduada José Celso Barbosa	Escuela Graduada José Celso Barbosa	May 19, 1989 (#89000406)	Ponce de León Ave. 18°27′57″N 66°06′04″W	San Juan Antiguo	Classical Revival style school from 1927.
28	Escuela Ruiz Belvis	Escuela Ruiz Belvis	August 31, 2022 (#100008115)	Fernandez Juncos Ave. (formerly known as Carretera Nueva), Stop 16 1/2; 18°27′00″N 66°04′38″W		
29	El Falansterio de Puerta de Tierra	El Falansterio de Puerta de Tierra	May 3, 1984 (#84003166)	Bounded by railroad right-of-way, Fernández Juncos Avenue, and Matías Ledesma and San Juan Bautista Streets; 18°27′48″N 66°05′47″W	San Juan Antiguo	New Deal era Art Deco public housing complex from 1937. Originally known as the Puerta de Tierra Tenement Group Project A and established by the FERA-funded Puerto Rico Reconstruction Administration.
30	Faro del Morro	Faro del Morro	October 22, 1981 (#81000693)	Summit of San Felipe del Morro Castle; 18°28′16″N 66°07′25″W	San Juan Antiguo	Oldest lighthouse in Puerto Rico, the current Moorish Revival-style version was however first lit in 1908. Located in Castillo San Felipe del Morro.
31	Figueroa Apartments	Figueroa Apartments	September 14, 2000 (#00001124)	601 Fernández Juncos Ave. 18°27′26″N 66°05′12″W	Santurce	Art Deco building from 1935 designed by Armando Morales Cano.
32	La Fortaleza	La Fortaleza	October 15, 1966 (#66000951)	Between San Juan Bay and Recinto Oeste St., at Fortaleza St. 18°27′51″N 66°07′09″W	San Juan Antiguo	Former fortress from 1533, also known as the Santa Catalina Palace, part of the fortification system of San Juan it is now the official residence of the governor of Puerto Rico and the oldest executive mansion in continuous use in the Western Hemisphere.
33	Fortín de San Gerónimo de Boquerón	Fortín de San Gerónimo de Boquerón	October 11, 1983 (#83004199)	Puerta de Tierra; 18°27′46″N 66°05′03″W	San Juan Antiguo	Small fortress from 1791, built at El Boquerón, in the entrance of Condado Lagoon, to provide defense against land and northeast attacks. Part of the Línea Avanzada historic district. Today it is preserved as the Military History Museum of Puerto Rico.
34	La Giralda	La Giralda	August 11, 2008 (#08000786)	651 José Martí St. 18°27′19″N 66°05′07″W	Santurce	Classical Revival and Victorian residence from 1910, designed by Francisco Valinés Cofresí.
35	Gran Logia Espiritual Número 1	Gran Logia Espiritual Número 1	June 8, 2008 (#06000507)	1612 Antonsanti St. 18°26′46″N 66°03′52″W	Santurce	Classical Revival-style Spiritualist meeting hall from 1910.
36	Hotel Normandie	Hotel Normandie	August 29, 1980 (#80004295)	Ponce de León Ave. and San Gerónimo St. 18°27′52″N 66°05′15″W	San Juan Antiguo	Hotel that is a spectacular example of Streamline Moderne architecture, inspired by the Art Deco-style design of the ship SS Normandie.
37	House at 659 Concordia Street	House at 659 Concordia Street	October 18, 1991 (#91001501)	659 Concordia St., Miramar; 18°27′09″N 66°04′56″W	Santurce	Mission/Spanish Revival house from 1935, designed by Joseph O'Kelly.
38	House at 659 La Paz Street	House at 659 La Paz Street	January 30, 1992 (#91002007)	659 La Paz St., Miramar; 18°27′10″N 66°04′58″W	Santurce	Mission/Spanish Revival house from 1928, designed by Pedro Adolfo de Castro.
39	House at 663 La Paz Street	House at 663 La Paz Street	October 18, 1991 (#91001500)	663 La Paz St., Miramar; 18°27′09″N 66°04′58″W	Santurce	Another Mission/Spanish Revival house designed by Pedro Adolfo de Castro.
40	House at 665 McKinley Street	House at 665 McKinley Street	October 19, 1991 (#91001502)	665 McKinley St., Miramar; 18°27′19″N 66°05′02″W	Santurce	Vernacular Spanish Creole house from 1906.
41	Instituto Loaiza Cordero para Ninos Ciegos Historic District – Distrito Historico Instituto Loaiza Cordero para Ninos Ciegos (Note: The name of the Distrito Historico Instituto Loaiza Cordero para Ninos Ciegos is presented here without the accents on "Histórico" and "Loaíza", and without the tilde on "Niños", in conformance with the usage in the district's Weekly List announcement of listing on the National Register.)	Instituto Loaiza Cordero para Ninos Ciegos Historic District – Distrito Historico Instituto Loaiza Cordero para Ninos Ciegos	October 23, 2018 (#100002935)	1312 Fernández Juncos Ave. 18°26′50″N 66°04′27″W	Santurce	Former Mediterranean Revival-style hospital and school complex for blind children founded by Loaiza Cordero del Rosario in 1925.
42	Rafael M. Labra High School	Rafael M. Labra High School	August 4, 1987 (#87001308)	Ponce de León and Roberto H. Todd Aves. 18°27′00″N 66°04′28″W	Santurce	Georgian style school building from 1916. Now functions as the Puerto Rico Museum of Contemporary Art.
43	Línea Avanzada	Línea Avanzada	September 25, 1997 (#97001136)	Eastern portion of the San Juan Islet; 18°27′53″N 66°05′26″W	San Juan Antiguo	Defensive fortification system established in 1797 to defend the city of San Juan from land-based and northeastern pirate and foreign attacks. Built to complement the fortification systems of northwestern San Juan.
44	Miami Building	Miami Building	August 23, 1984 (#84003169)	868 Ashford Ave. 18°27′37″N 66°04′50″W	Santurce	Art Deco building from 1936, designed by Pedro Méndez Mercado.
45	Luis Muñoz Rivera Park	Luis Muñoz Rivera Park	November 14, 2007 (#07001195)	Ponce de León Ave., Stop 8, Puerta de Tierra; 18°27′52″N 66°05′28″W	San Juan Antiguo	Park with Beaux Arts and Picturesque architecture and landscape design.
46	Mural "La Familia"	Mural "La Familia"	October 23, 2017 (#100001763)	2030 Avenida Borinquen; 18°26′15″N 66°03′18″W	Santurce	
47	General Norzagaray Bridge	General Norzagaray Bridge	July 19, 1995 (#95000833)	Highway 873, km 0.8, spanning the Quebrada Frailes; 18°21′07″N 66°05′29″W	Caimito and Tortugo	Brick barrel vault bridge from 1855, known also as Puente de Los Frailes
48	Nuestra Señora de Lourdes Chapel	Nuestra Señora de Lourdes Chapel	September 27, 1984 (#84003171)	Ponce de León and Miramar Aves. 18°27′23″N 66°05′07″W	Santurce	Neo-Gothic style chapel from 1908, designed by Antonin Nechodoma
49	Martín Peña Bridge	Martín Peña Bridge	August 27, 2008 (#08000856)	Highway 25, km 8; 18°26′00″N 66°03′33″W	Santurce, Hato Rey Norte, and Hato Rey Central	Art Deco style bridge from 1939, designed by Cecilio Delgado and others
50	Polvorín de Miraflores	Polvorín de Miraflores	March 9, 1984 (#84003172)	66 Aramania St., Old Miramar Naval Base; 18°26′58″N 66°05′38″W	Santurce	A gunpowder magazine from 1776
51	Puerta de Tierra Historic District – Distrito Histórico de Puerta de Tierra	Puerta de Tierra Historic District – Distrito Histórico de Puerta de Tierra	October 15, 2019 (#100002936)	San Juan Islet to the east of the Old San Juan Historic District; 18°27′51″N 66°05′54″W	San Juan Antiguo	
52	Puerto Rico Ilustrado – Edificio El Mundo	Puerto Rico Ilustrado – Edificio El Mundo	September 25, 1997 (#97001137)	254 San José St. 18°27′51″N 66°07′01″W	San Juan Antiguo	From 1923
53	Puerto Rico Island Penitentiary	Puerto Rico Island Penitentiary	March 7, 2003 (#03000100)	South of Highway 21; 18°23′19″N 66°04′15″W	Monacillo Urbano	Built 1933, closed 2004, demolished 2015
54	Residencia Aboy–Lompre	Residencia Aboy–Lompre	March 22, 1989 (#88001304)	900 Ponce de León Ave. 18°27′16″N 66°04′51″W	Santurce	A Prairie School style house from 1919, designed by Antonin Nechodoma and others
55	Residencia de Señoritas Universidad de Puerto Rico, Río Piedras	Residencia de Señoritas Universidad de Puerto Rico, Río Piedras	July 23, 2018 (#100002695)	Near the intersection of Gándara and Barbosa Aves. 18°24′09″N 66°02′48″W	Universidad	
56	Residencia Luis Muñoz Marín	Residencia Luis Muñoz Marín	September 29, 2011 (#11000712)	Highway 877, km 0.4; 18°23′12″N 66°01′42″W	Sabana Llana Sur	
57	Río Piedras Bridge	Río Piedras Bridge	July 19, 1995 (#95000832)	Highway 8839, km 12.5; 18°23′40″N 66°03′21″W	El Cinco and Hato Rey Sur	A brick barrel vault bridge from 1853
58	Rum Pilot Plant		July 26, 2010 (#10000501)	Highway 1, University of Puerto Rico Agricultural Experiment Station; 18°23′46″N 66°03′48″W	El Cinco	
59	San Antonio Railroad Bridge	San Antonio Railroad Bridge	September 30, 2009 (#09000789)	Spanning San Antonio Channel adjacent to Highway 1 at the east end of San Juan Islet; 18°27′34″N 66°05′13″W	San Juan Antiguo and Santurce	
60	San Juan National Historic Site	San Juan National Historic Site	October 15, 1966 (#66000930)	Old San Juan (Note: The National Register listing for the San Juan National Historic Site includes components in both San Juan and Toa Baja municipalities.); 18°28′10″N 66°07′17″W	San Juan Antiguo	Dates from 1525
61	School of Tropical Medicine	School of Tropical Medicine	September 29, 1983 (#83002297)	Ponce de León Ave., Puerta de Tierra; 18°28′01″N 66°06′14″W	San Juan Antiguo	Neo-Plateresque building from 1920
62	Superintendent of Lighthouses' Dwelling	Superintendent of Lighthouses' Dwelling	October 22, 1981 (#81000694)	Coast Guard Station San Juan, La Puntilla; 18°27′36″N 66°07′01″W	San Juan Antiguo	Hacienda style building from 1908 located inside the U.S Coast Guard base in La Puntilla
63	Supreme Court Building	Supreme Court Building	June 14, 2006 (#06000506)	Luis Muñoz Rivera Park; 18°27′47″N 66°05′18″W	San Juan Antiguo	Modern Movement building from 1955
64	Templo del Maestro	Templo del Maestro	April 19, 2016 (#16000189)	Constitución Ave., Stop 8; 18°27′46″N 66°05′24″W	San Juan Antiguo	
65	U.S. Custom House	U.S. Custom House	February 10, 1988 (#88000075)	1 Puntilla St. 18°27′46″N 66°06′56″W	San Juan Antiguo	1924 building designed by Albert B. Nichols
66	U.S. Post Office and Courthouse	U.S. Post Office and Courthouse	March 28, 1988 (#87000694)	Block bounded by San Justo, Tanca, Commercio, and Recinto Sur Streets; 18°27′50″N 66°06′53″W	San Juan Antiguo	From 1914, designed by Oscar Wenderoth
67	University of Puerto Rico Tower and Quadrangle	University of Puerto Rico Tower and Quadrangle	May 17, 1984 (#84003174)	Ponce de León Ave. 18°24′10″N 66°02′59″W	Universidad	Tower and quadrangle from 1935, designed by Rafael Carmoega
68	Villa Victoria	Villa Victoria	January 6, 2015 (#14001135)	905 Ponce de León Ave. 18°27′16″N 66°04′48″W	Santurce	

== See also ==
- National Register of Historic Places listings in Puerto Rico
- List of United States National Historic Landmarks in United States commonwealths and territories, associated states, and foreign states
- Historic preservation
- History of Puerto Rico
