= General Archives of Puerto Rico =

Institute of Puerto Rican Culture organization

The General Archives of Puerto Rico was formally created by Law 5 of December 8, 1955, and placed under the Institute of Puerto Rican Culture which had been created six months before. The main function of the entity is to safeguard and conserve the most important inactive documents of Puerto Rico's territorial government, both under United States rule as well as during the 390 years of Spanish colonial government in Puerto Rico between 1508 and 1898.

The General Archives shares space with the National Library in the Dr. Ricardo Alegría Building facing Luis Muñoz Rivera Park in the Puerta de Tierra subbarrio of San Juan Antiguo in San Juan. The building has served many purposes prior to housing the archives, including serving for a year as the Spanish Civil Hospital beginning in 1877, subsequently as a jail, an Orphaned Girls Home when sovereignty was transferred from the Kingdom of Spain to the United States, once again a hospital under American rule, subsequently a tobacco warehouse for the Porto Rican American Tobacco Company from 1906 to 1959 along with a Bacardí rum facility. In 1959 it was acquired by the Institute of Puerto Rican Culture.

The archives currently hold 70 thousand cubic feet of storage space.

== Archivists of Puerto Rico ==
- Luís M. Rodríguez Morales - 1955-1973,
- Miguel A. Nieves - 1976-1989,
- Luis de La Rosa Martínez - 1989-1994,
- Karin Cardona de Jesús - 1995
- Nelly Cruz Rodríguez - 1995-1999,
- Karin Cardona de Jesús - 1999-2008,
- José A. Flores Rivera - 2009-2013,
- Karin Cardona de Jesús - 2013-2017,
- Lcdo. Samuel Quiñones García - 2017-2018,
- Lcdo. Héctor A. Dávila Gómez - 2018-

== See also ==
- Archivo General de Puerto Rico
- Puerto Rico National Library
