= Pedro Méndez Mercado =

Twentieth-century Puerto Rican architect from Ponce, Puerto Rico

- Born: 26 June 1902; Ponce, Puerto Rico
- Died: 1990; Ponce, Puerto Rico
- Known for: Architecture
- Notable work: Plaza de Mercado Isabel II (Ponce), Miami Building (San Juan)
- Movement: Ponce Creole architecture
- Spouse: Celia Gómez
- Elected: President, Ponce Municipal Assembly
- Patrons: Government of Puerto Rico, Government of Ponce

Pedro Méndez Mercado was a twentieth-century Puerto Rican architect from Ponce, Puerto Rico. He designed many prominent structures, including the 1941 enlargement of Plaza de Mercado de Ponce in Ponce and the "Edificio Miami" (Miami Building) in San Juan. He also designed "Apartamentos Beatriz" in Ponce, and is believed to have designed at least half a dozen theaters in Ponce.

== Early years ==
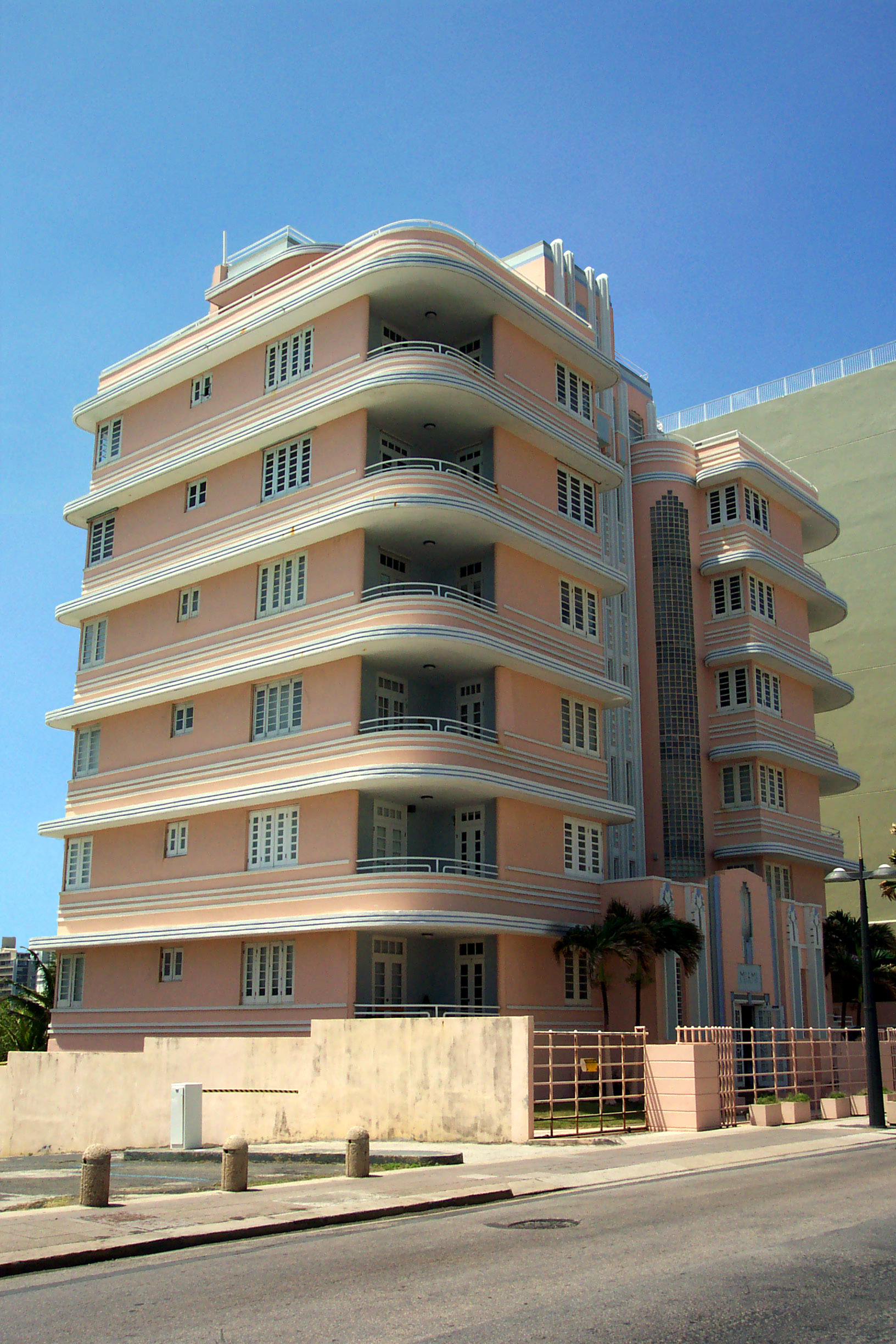
Miami Building (Edificio Miami) by Pedro Méndez Mercado

Pedro Méndez Mercado was born in Ponce, Puerto Rico, on 26 June 1902. He was the second of eight children born to José Méndez López, a Spanish businessman with a store in Ponce across from Plaza de Mercado de Isabel Segunda, and Rosario Mercado Galarza, from Yauco, Puerto Rico. He studied in Ponce and graduated from Ponce High School in 1920.

== Schooling ==
En 1920, he spent one year as a mechanical engineering student at Cornell University. He returned to Puerto Rico in 1921 to continue his mechanical engineering studies at Recinto Universitario de Mayaguez. However, he became a student in the newly created Department of Architecture, where he spent 3 years until the program was canceled in 1924. As a result of the closing of the architecture program, he registered at the Syracuse University where he graduated in 1926 with a Bachelor's in Architecture.

== Professional life ==
He returned to Puerto Rico in 1926 where he worked in the Puerto Rico Public Buildings Authority. His first project as an architectural draftsman was the design of the Guayama Fire station. In 1932 he returned to Ponce with his wife Celia Gómez and their newborn baby to work in the private sector.

In 1935 he returned to San Juan where he was briefly employed in the Puerto Rico Emergency Relief Administration and later as construction inspector at Casa de España. There, he met Pedro Adolfo de Castro (1894-1936), with whom he developed a close professional relationship. During those years, they developed most of their Art Deco designs. For example, the "Miami Apartments Building" (ca.1935) in the Condado area of San Juan.

Stunned by the death of his father in January 1936 and that of Pedro Adolfo in October of the same year, Mendez Mercado returned to Ponce in 1937, where he remained until 1941. While in Ponce, he worked on the design of the remodeling of Plaza de Mercado Isabel II.

In 1941 he returned to San Juan to work for the United States Department of the Interior, first as superintendent of the Puerto Rico Capitol and later as chief in the Puerto Rico Public Buildings Authority.

After the end of World War II he returned to Ponce, where he remained. In Ponce, he established his private practice and worked for various government agencies. He is believed to have designed most of the Art Deco theaters in Ponce during this time.

== Public service ==
While in Ponce, he became an officer in the Ponce Firefighters Corps and a municipal assemblyman as well as president of the Ponce Municipal Assembly and president of the Board of the Ponce Wharf.

== Death and legacy ==
After he retired from public service, Méndez continued his private practice until his retirement in 1982. "from his drafting table, in the 56 years he was active practicing architecture, he forged ideas that, in one way or another, have affected the development and memory of the Puerto Rican people."

== Honors ==
He is honored at Ponce's Park of the Illustrious Ponce Citizens.

== See also ==
- Alfredo Wiechers
- Francisco Porrata Doria
