= La Giralda (San Juan, Puerto Rico) =

House in San Juan, Puerto Rico

- U.S. National Register of Historic Places
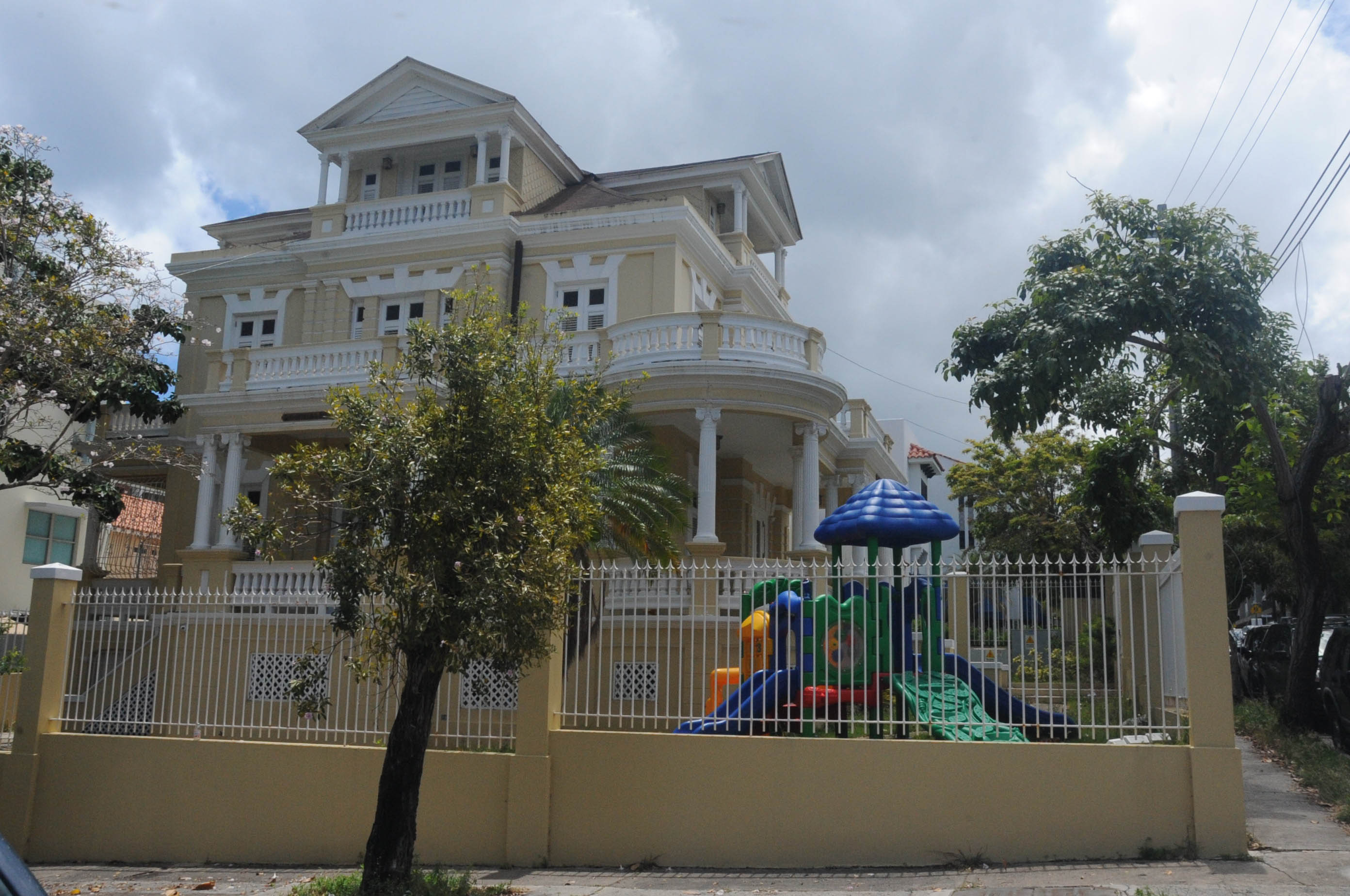

- Location within Puerto Rico
- Location: 651 José Martí Street (formerly known as Comercio Street), Santurce, San Juan, Puerto Rico
- Coordinates: 18°27′19″N 66°05′07″W
- Built: c. 1910
- Architect: Francisco Valinés Cofresí
- Architectural style: Classical Revival, Victorian
- NRHP reference No.: 08000786
- Added to NRHP: August 11, 2008

La Giralda in the Santurce barrio of San Juan, Puerto Rico is a four-story reinforced concrete house that was built in c. 1910. It was listed on the U.S. National Register of Historic Places in 2008.

It is located at 651 José Martí Street, at Miramar Avenue, at the highest point of the Miramar neighborhood, and is believed to have been designed by architect Francisco Valinés Cofresí and includes eclectic architectural style, including Neoclassical and Victorian elements, on an irregular square plan with a rounded balcony at its corner. It is unusual for its complexity including a crossed gabled roof with pediments. It is regarded as a "historic jewel", the finest of 21 buildings surviving in Miramar from the early 20th century.
