= List of theaters in Ponce, Puerto Rico =

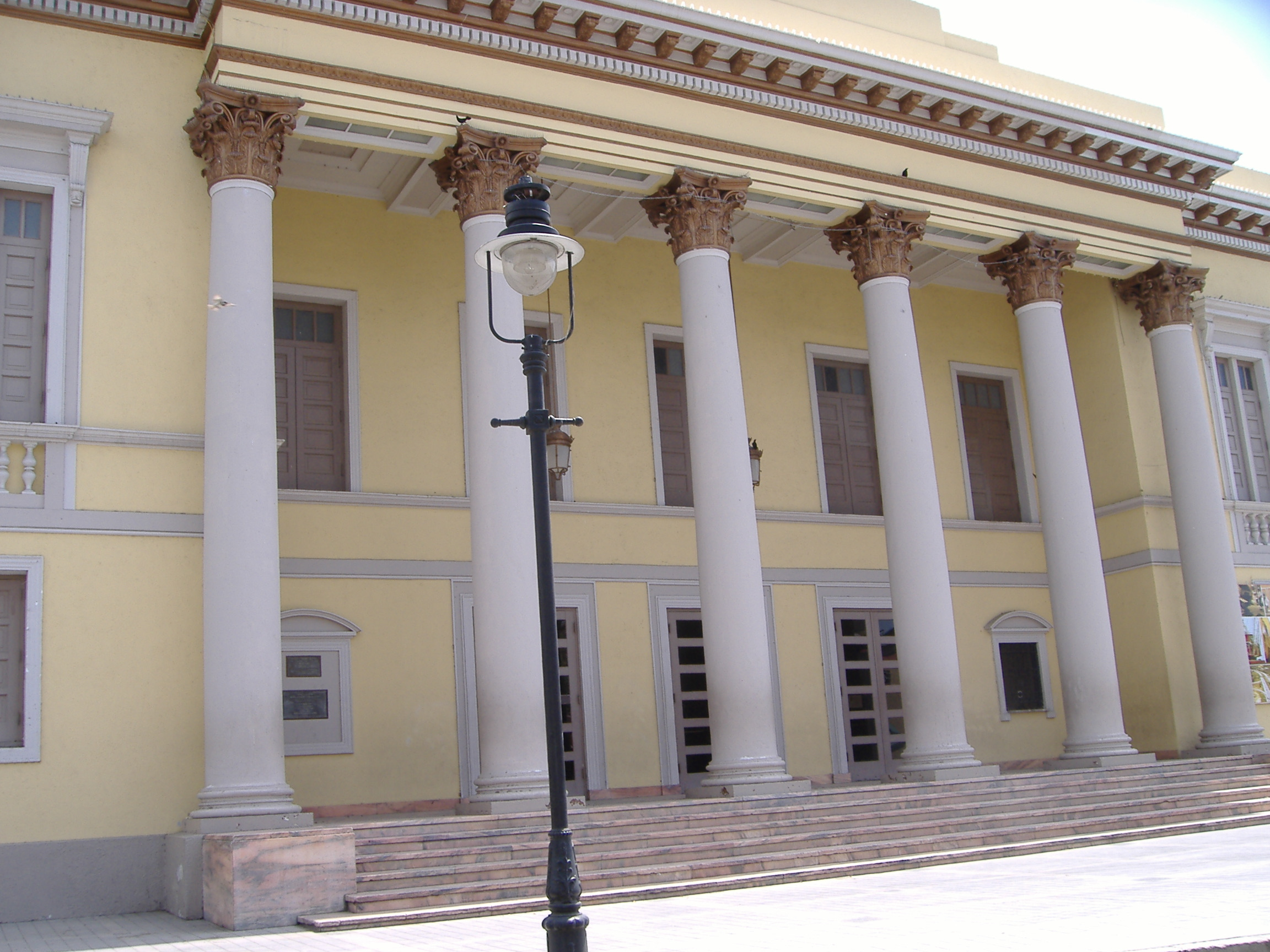
Teatro La Perla

This list of theaters in Ponce, Puerto Rico, consists of both movie theaters as well as the traditional performing arts theaters in the city of Ponce, Puerto Rico. Both historical (including no longer existing) as well a currently operating theaters are listed. During the first half of the 20th century, most theaters have been located in the central urban zone of the city. One prominent exception is Teatro Miramar, the theater that served the Playa community in barrio Playa, Ponce. Today's cinema theaters oftentimes have several screens under a single roof.

== Theater list summary table ==
No.	Name	Photo	Barrio	Location	Type/Use	Opened (Year)	Halls	Seats	Architect	Style	Demolished Date
1	Teatro La Perla		Cuarto	C. Mayor NB and C. Cristina	Musical	1864	1	1,047	Juan Bertoli Calderoni	Neoclassical	Still standing
2	Teatro Fox Delicias		Segundo	Plaza Muñoz Rivera WB	Cinema	1931	1	Unk	Francisco Porrata-Doria	Art Deco	Still standing
3	Teatro Victoria		Segundo	C. Union NB and C. Victoria	Cinema	1930s	1	Unk	Pedro Mendez Mercado?	Art Deco	Still standing
4	Teatro Rívoli (former Habana)		Tercero	C. Sol EB and C. Leon	Cinema	1909	1	Unk	Alfredo Wiechers Pieretti	Art Deco	Still standing
5	Teatro Broadway		Quinto	C. Mayor SB, between C. Sol and C. Isabel	Cinema	1918	1	1,000	Eduardo Salichs	Spanish Colonial Revival	March 1982
6	Teatro Miramar		Playa	C. Arias WB and C. Alfonso XII (Note: The theater is located at the northeast corner of Calle Arias and Calle Alfonso XII (aka Calle Dr. Ulises Clavell).)	Cinema	Before 1946	1	Unk	Unknown	Art Deco	Still standing
7	Teatro Argel		Segundo	C. Victoria EB and C. Fogos	Cinema	1940	1	Unk	Pedro Méndez Mercado	Art Deco	Still standing
8	Teatro Rex		Sexto	C. Cantera NB and C. Acueducto	Cinema	1930s	1	Unk	Pedro Mendez Mercado?	Art Deco	Still standing
9	Teatro Bélgica		Cuarto	C. Gran Via WB and C. Colombia	Cinema	1940	1	Unk	Pedro Mendez Mercado?	Art Deco	Still standing
10	Teatro Hollywood		Primero	C. Villa EB and C. Esperanza	Cinema	1930s	1	Unk	Pedro Mendez Mercado?	Art Deco	Still standing
11	Teatro Universal		Segundo	C. Progreso SB and C. Sol	Cinema	1930s	1	Unk	Pedro Mendez Mercado?	Art Deco	Still standing
12	Teatro National		Cuarto	C. Comercio EB, between C. Cruz and C. Tres (Belgica)	Cinema	1930s	1	Unk	Unknown	Modern	Still standing
13	Ponce Towne Center		Canas	PR-2 WB and Avenida Barayama NB	Cinema	1997/2013	13	Unk	Unknown	Modern	Still standing
14	Caribbean Cinemas		Playa	Plaza del Caribe Mall	Cinema	1992	11	Unk	Unknown	Modern	Still standing
15	El Emperador 1&2		Machuelo Abajo	Blvd. Miguel Pou WB, Urb. Valle Verde	Cinema	Unknown	2	575 each hall	George Schavran	Modern	2000
16	Teatro Apolo (former Mundial)		Quinto	C. Salud SB, between C. Guadalupe and C. Estrella	Cinema	Unknown	1	Unk	Unknown	Neoclassical	ca. 1950s
17	Teatro Venus		Unknown	Unknown	Mixed	1913	1	Unk	Unknown	Unknown	Unknown
18	Teatro Santa María		Canas Urbano	C. Ferrocarril WB, between C. Capitan Correa and C. James McManus	Cinema	Unknown	1	Unk	Unknown	Modern	ca. 1980s
19	Twin Towers		San Anton	PR-133 EB, between Av. Las Americas and C. Napoles	Cinema	Unknown	3	Unk	Unknown	Modern	Still standing
20	Ponce Drive-In		Playa	Ponce Bypass EB and PR-585	Cinema	Unknown	1	Unk	Unknown	Drive-In	ca. 1970s
21	Teatro UPRP		Playa	U. de Puerto Rico en Ponce	Musical	Unknown	1	500	Unknown	Modern	Still standing
22	Teatro Antonio Paoli		Sabanetas	Universidad Interamericana de Puerto Rico en Ponce	Musical	Unknown	1	Unk	Unknown	Modern	Still standing
23	Teatro Vicente Murga		Canas Urbano	Pontificia Universidad Católica de Puerto Rico	Multi-use	2015 (Note: 2015 is the date when Teatro Vicenta Murga (PUCPR) was significantly enlarged; this theater already existed many years prior to 2015.)	1	700+	Unknown	Modern	Still standing
24	Concha Acústica de Ponce		Cuarto	C. Marina NB and C. Campeche	Musical	After ca. 1890s	1	Unk	Unknown	Art Deco	Still standing

Key:
C. = Calle (street)
NB = Northbound
SB = Southbound
WB = Westbound
EB = Eastbound

Rafael Ramos Cobian was the owner of the Victoria, Apolo, Hollywood, Universal, Belgica, Argel, and Nacional theaters; Luis Fortuño Janeiro owned the Rex; Teatro Miramar belonged to the Carlo Family. The first owner of Teatro Broadway was Rafael Napoleonis.

== Gallery ==
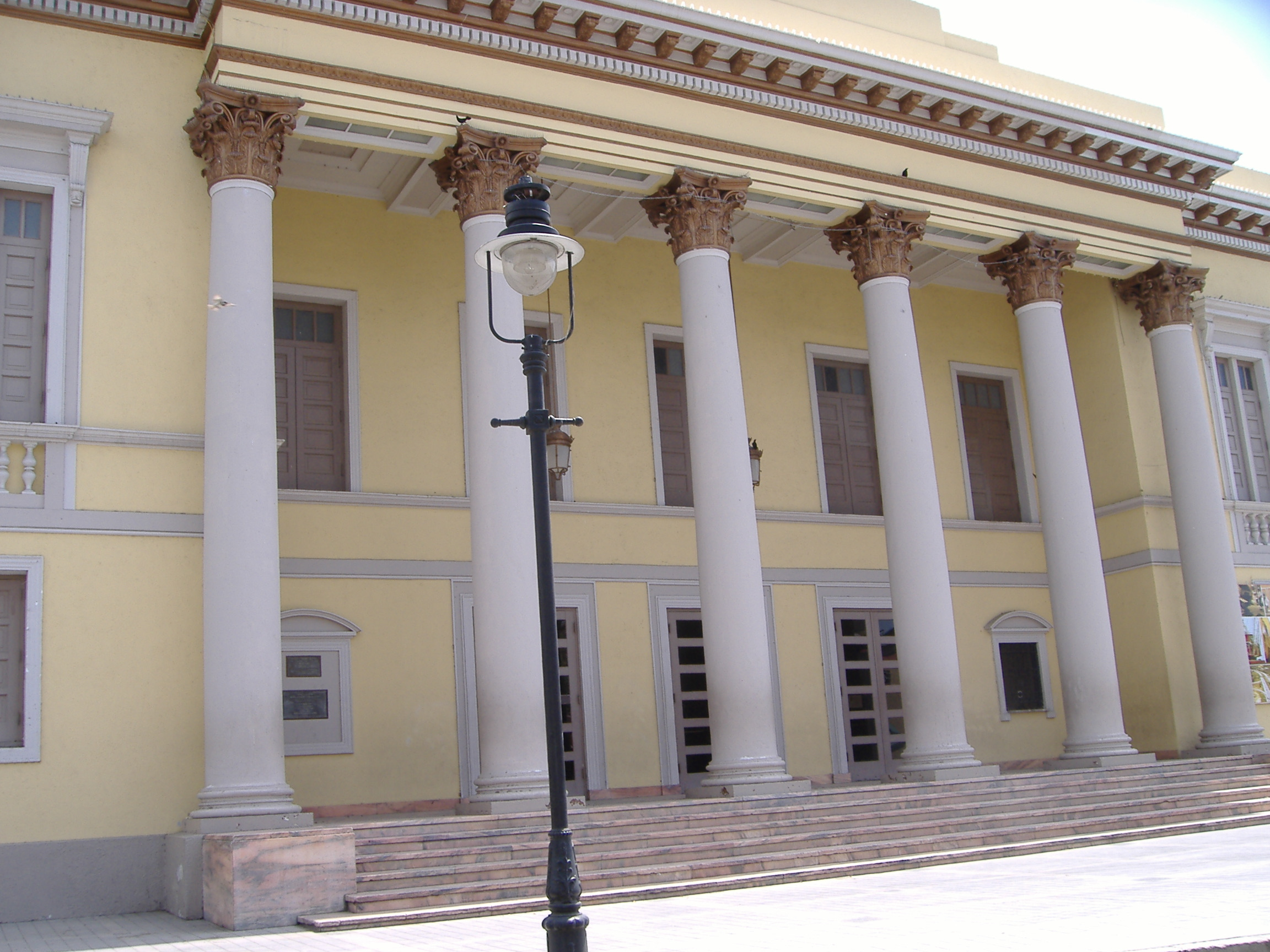
Teatro La Perla (1864)

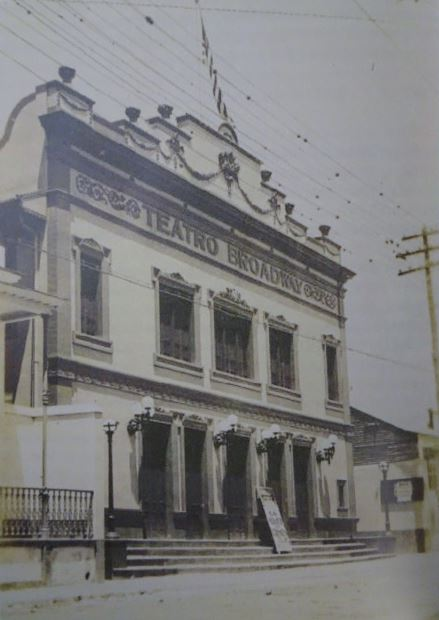
Teatro Broadway (1918-1982)

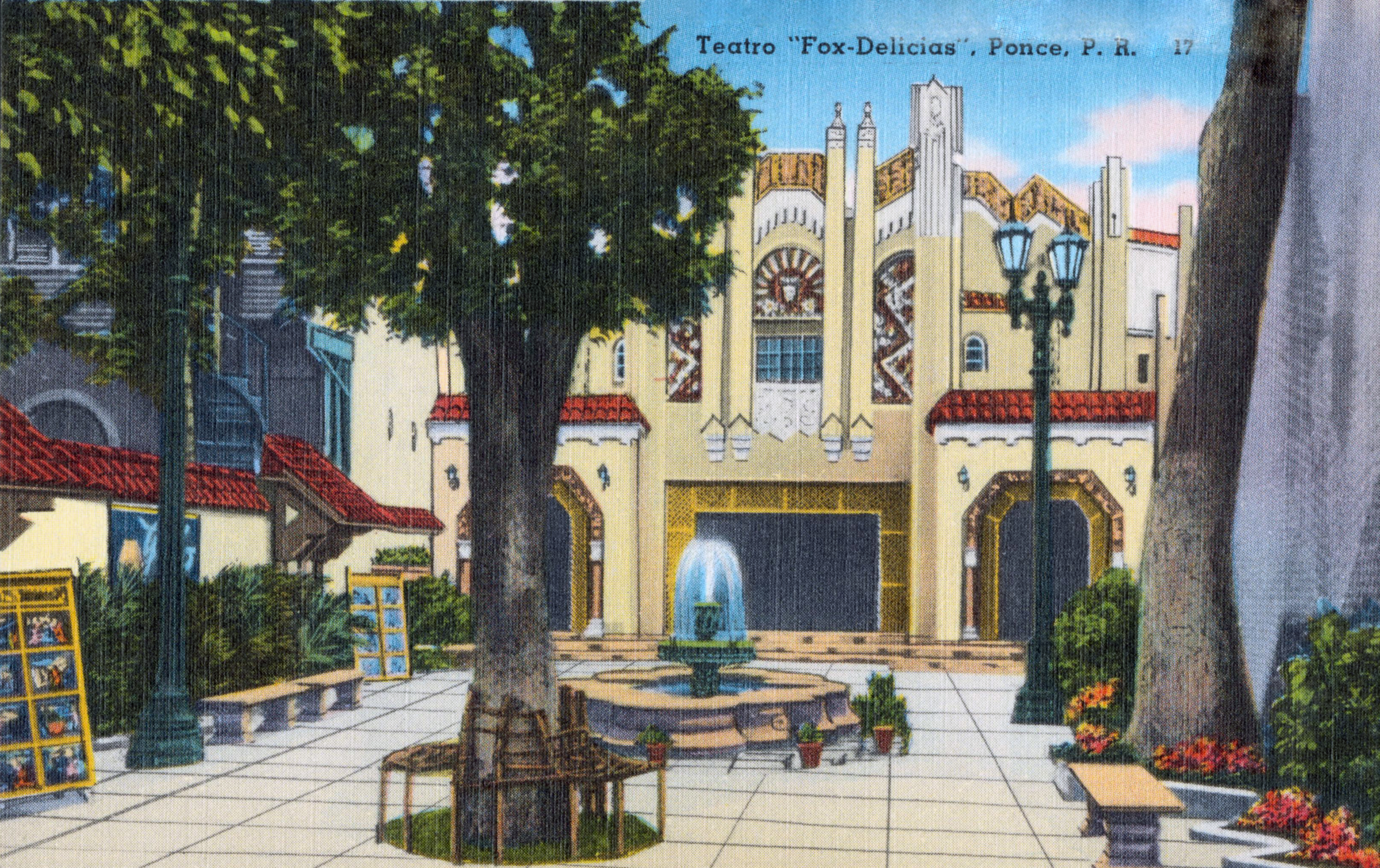
Teatro Fox Delicias (1931)

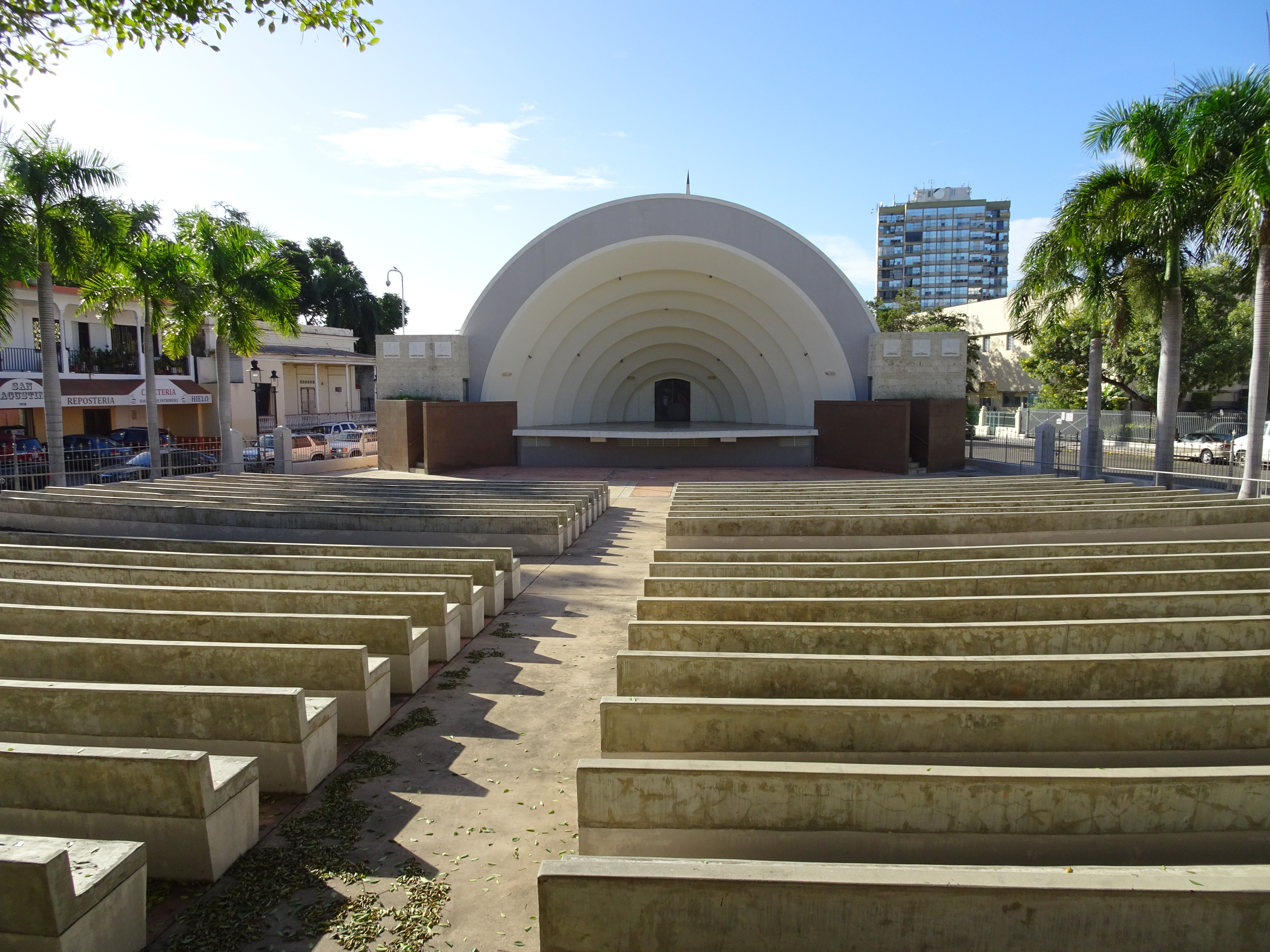
Concha Acústica de Ponce (1956)
