= Palmira López de Pereyó House =

Historic building in Humacao, Puerto Rico

- U.S. National Register of Historic Places
- Puerto Rico Historic Sites and Zones
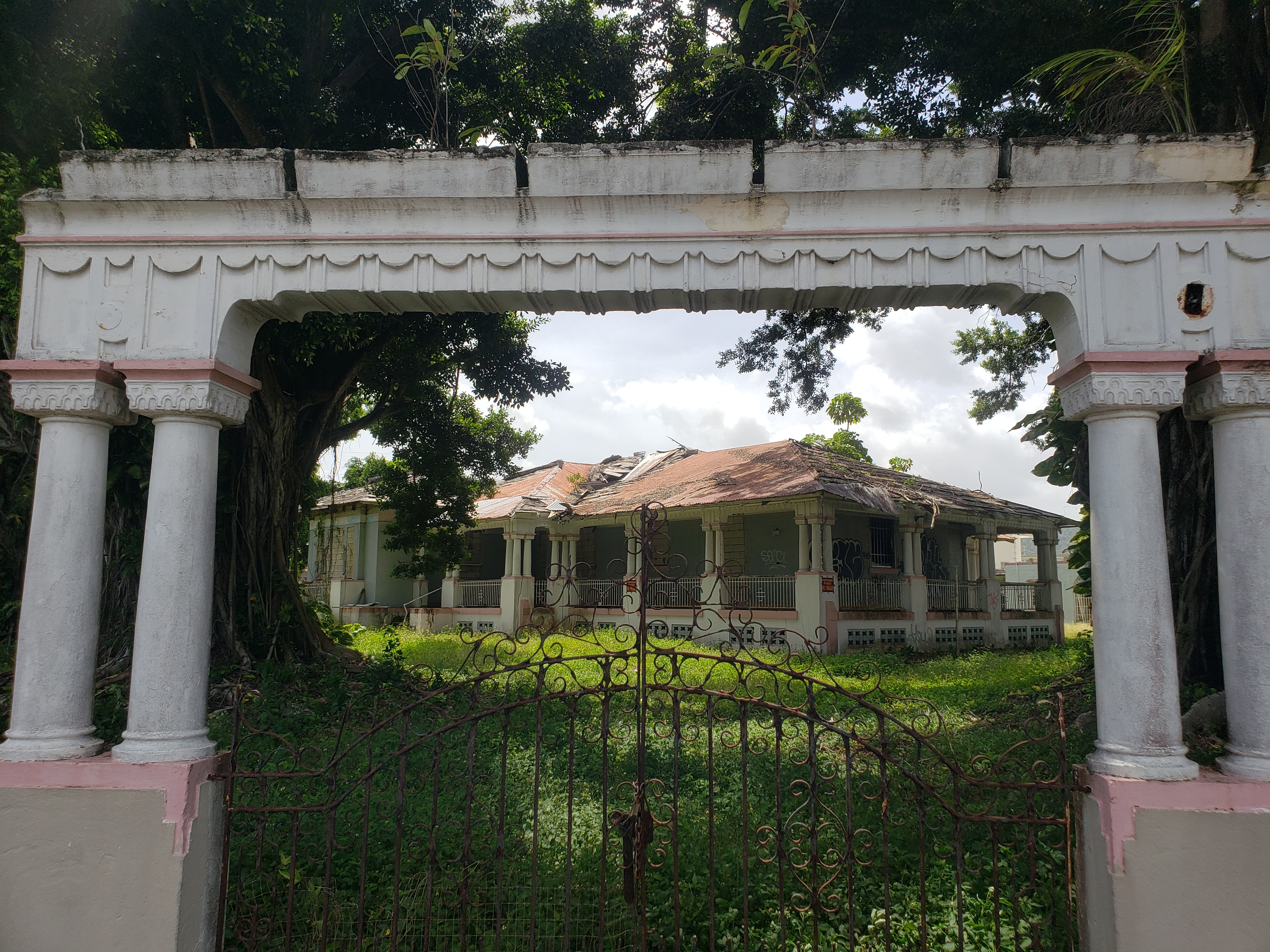
- The house in 2020.

- Location within Puerto Rico
- Location: Junction of Font Martelo and Minerva Streets Humacao, Puerto Rico
- Coordinates: 18°9′2″N 65°49′49″W
- Built: 1930
- Architect: Francisco Valinés Cofresí
- Architectural style: Prairie School
- NRHP reference No.: 95000435
- RNSZH No.: 2000-(RE)-18-JP-SH

Significant dates
- Added to NRHP: April 14, 1995
- Designated RNSZH: May 16, 2001

The Pereyó House (Spanish: Casa Pereyó), formally referred to as the Palmira López de Pereyó Residence (Residencia Palmira López de Pereyó), is a historic Prairie School-style house from 1930 designed by Francisco Valinés Cofresí located in Humacao, Puerto Rico. It was added to the United States National Register of Historic Places in 1995, and to the Puerto Rico Register of Historic Sites and Zones on May 16, 2001.

The designer of the residence, Francisco Valinés Cofresí, had graduated from a program of architectural correspondence study offered by the International Correspondence School in Scranton, Pennsylvania. The Prairie School style of the Pereyó House is best represented in Puerto Rico by a group of residences built by architect Antonin Nechodoma. Nechodoma received the direct influence of the work of American architect Frank Lloyd Wright. This Prairie design was considered at the time as a perfect style for the island, as it maintained the traditional style of tropical architecture features such as balconies, terraces, galleries, shutters, French doors and windows, ceilings in water, among other, while representing American modernity.

The house belonged to Luis Pereyó y Rodríguez, who served as Judge of the District Court Humacao between the decades of 1930s and 1960s, and his wife Palmira Pereyó López.

== See also ==
- Casa Roig Museum: another Prairie School-style building in Humacao
- National Register of Historic Places listings in eastern Puerto Rico
