= Evaristo Ribera Chevremont =

Puerto Rican poet

- Born: Evaristo Ribera Chevremont; February 16, 1890; San Juan, Puerto Rico
- Died: March 1, 1976 (aged 86); San Juan, Puerto Rico
- Occupation: Poet
- Writing career
- Literary movement: Modernismo

Evaristo Ribera Chevremont (February 16, 1890 in San Juan – March 1, 1976) was a poet from Puerto Rico. Although several of his published books deal with Puerto Rican nationality and regionalism, many of his verses excel in a universal lyrical character, as can be read in books such as El Caos de Los Sueños and El Hondero Lanzó la Piedra, among others.

== Literary Styles ==
Ribera Chevremont is considered to be one of the great poets of the Antilles and mid-twentieth century critics such as Federico de Onís and Concha Meléndez even considered him one of the most important poets of the Spanish language. Ribera Chevremont traveled to Spain several times and established friendly ties with some writers' circles. He was much admired for his prolific poetic gift, and several of his works were published in that country, as well as in Puerto Rico. He mastered several modern poetic techniques, such as Hispanoamerican Modernism, European Ultraism and Suprarealism. He wrote in free verse as well as in traditional forms, specifically, sonnets, which he mastered fully, as seen in Sonetos del Mar, del Amor, de la Soledad, de la Muerte, de Dios, among others. His last book to reach the public, Sonetos a Galicia, a book dedicated to the land of his father, was published posthumously in 1994 by the poet's widow, María Luisa Méndez de Chevremont and his daughter Iris Ribera-Chevremont Méndez, through the Xunta de Galicia in Spain.

Ribera Chevremont published his first volume of verse, Desfile Romántico, in 1914. In 1974, the poet published El Caos de los Sueños, a book of poems in free verse of a profound, lyrical and universal nature. In 1980, the University of Puerto Rico Press published a complete anthology of his poems in two large volumes, Evaristo Ribera Chevremont: Obra poetica Vol I & II. Besides that comprehensive collection, several poetry books have been posthumously published, such as Jinetes de la inmortalidad, El Libro de las Apologías, and Sonetos a Galicia.

== Published books ==
- Desfile Romántico, 1914
- El Templo de los Alabastros, 1919
- La Copa del Hebe, 1922
- Los Almendros del Paseo Covadonga
- Pajarera
- La Hora del Orifice, 1929
- Tierra y Sombra, 1930
- Color 1938
- Tonos y Formas, 1943
- Barro, 1945
- Anclas de Oro, 1945
- Tú, Mar, Yo y Ella, 1946
- Verbo, 1947
- El Niño de Arcilla, 1950
- Creación, 1951
- La llama Pensativa, 1954
- Inefable Orilla, 1961
- Memorial de Arena, 1962
- Punto Final (Poemas del Sueño y de la Muerte)
- Principio de Canto, 1965
- El Semblante
- Rió Volcado 1968
- Canto de mi Tierra
- El Caos de los Sueños 1974
- El Hondero Lanzó la Piedra, 1975
- El Libro de las Apologías, 1976 (Posthumous)
- Jinetes de la Inmortalidad, 1977 (Posthumous)
- Elegías a San Juan, 1980 (Posthumous)
- Obra Poética, Vol I, 1980
- Obra Poética, Vol II, 1980
- Sonetos a Galicia, 1994(Posthumous)

== Critical Bibliography ==
- Melendez, Concha; La inquietud sosegada : poética de Evaristo Chevremont; Editorial Imprenta Soltero, San Juan (Puerto Rico), 1956
- Marxuach, Carmen Irene; Evaristo Ribera Chevremont : voz de vanguardia; Editorial Universidad de Puerto Rico, 1987
- González, José Emilio, "La Poesía de Evaristo Ribera Chevrmont", Evaristo Ribera Chevremont:Obra Poética, Universidad de Puerto Rico, 1980
- de Onís, Federico, Antología Poetica, 1924–1950, Universidad de Puerto Rico, San Juan 1957
- Guillén, Jorge, "Carta a Evaristo Ribera Chevremont", in Principio de Canto, Editorial Venezuela, San Juan, 1965
- Gallego, Laura, "Las Ideas Literarias de Evaristo Ribera Chevremont", Instituto de Cultura Puertorriqueña

== See also ==
- List of Puerto Ricans
- French immigration to Puerto Rico
- List of Puerto Rican writers
- Puerto Rican literature
