= Miami Building =

- The Miami Building
- U.S. National Register of Historic Places
- Puerto Rico Historic Sites and Zones
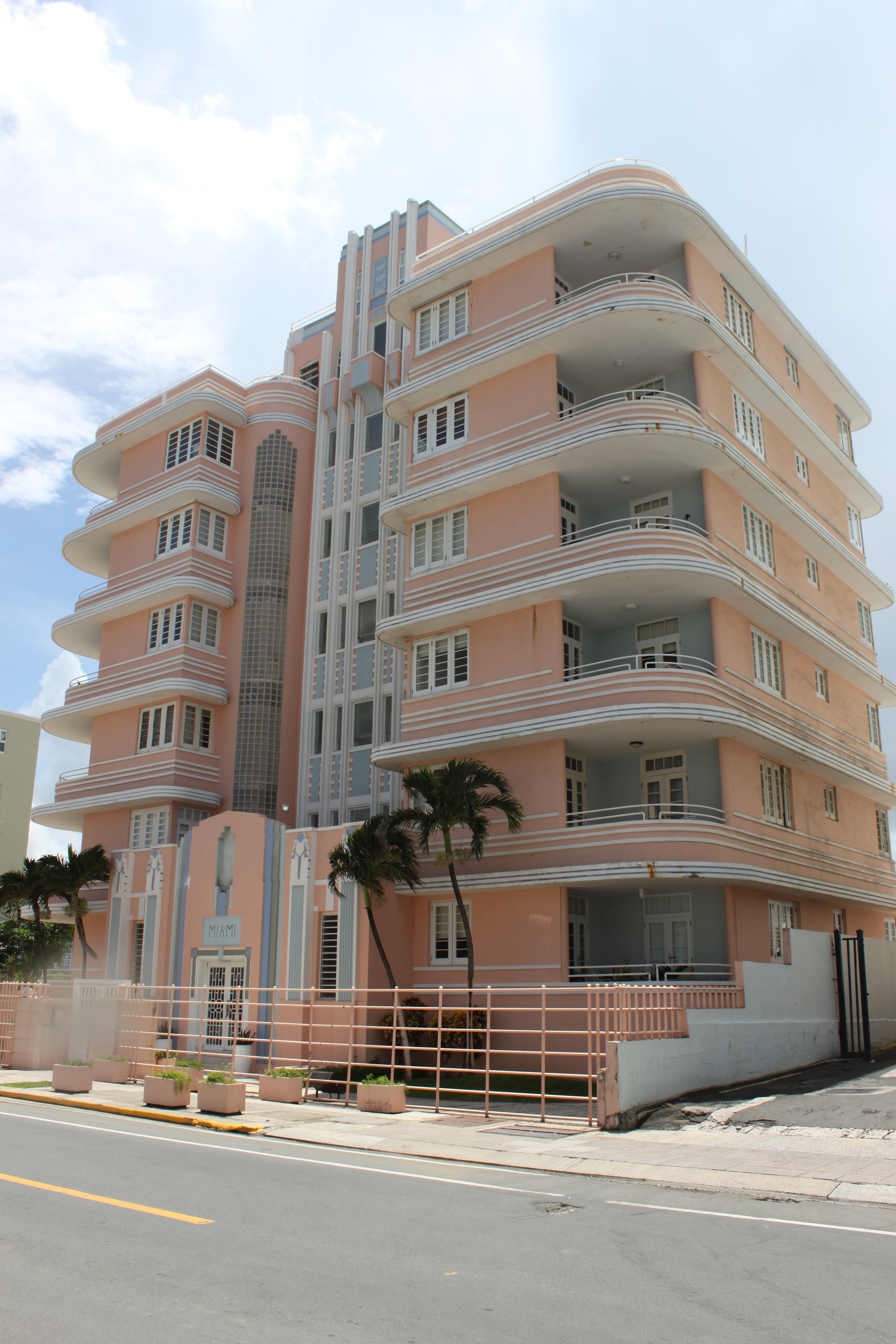
- The building as seen from Ashford Ave in 2014.

- Location within Puerto Rico
- Location: 868 Ave. Ashford, San Juan, Puerto Rico
- Coordinates: 18.4602228°N 66.0816394°W
- Built: 1936
- Architect: Pedro Méndez
- Architectural style: Art Deco
- NRHP reference No.: 84003169
- RNSZH No.: 95-18-005-JP-SH

Significant dates
- Added to NRHP: August 23, 1984
- Designated RNSZH: August 17, 1995

The Miami Building (Spanish: El Edificio Miami), also known as the Miami Apartments or the 868 Ashford Building, is a historic Art Deco building located in the Avenida Ashford of the Condado section of Santurce in the city of San Juan, Puerto Rico. The building was added to the National Register of Historic Places in 1984 and to the Puerto Rico Register of Historic Sites and Zones in 1995.

The 6-floor Miami Building is located in 868 Avenida Ashford, and was the first private apartment building to be built in the tourist section of Condado, and possibly the first purpose-built apartment building to be erected in the island. At the time it was the second tallest building in the area after the historic Vanderbilt Hotel. The building was designed by Syracuse University graduate architect Pedro Méndez and built by contractor firm Beltrán, Miró and Benítez at the cost of $90,000 ($1,979,294.24 in 2023). It was first owned by a Venezuelan-Puerto Rican with the name of Mr. Tirado.

The building design decisively set the trends of Art Deco style in Puerto Rican architecture of the mid 20th-century along with the Aboy Building, and it is considered the finest example of Art Deco architecture in Puerto Rico and the Caribbean. It contains 24 apartment units, all of which consisting of a foyer, dining and living rooms, a kitchen, a bathroom, two bedrooms and a curved foyer balcony. The building façade is famous for its traditional Art Deco designs, particularly the main structure of the entrance with its glass doors, glass brick windows, and the name MIAMI written in the Art Deco variation of the Metro typeface.

== Gallery ==
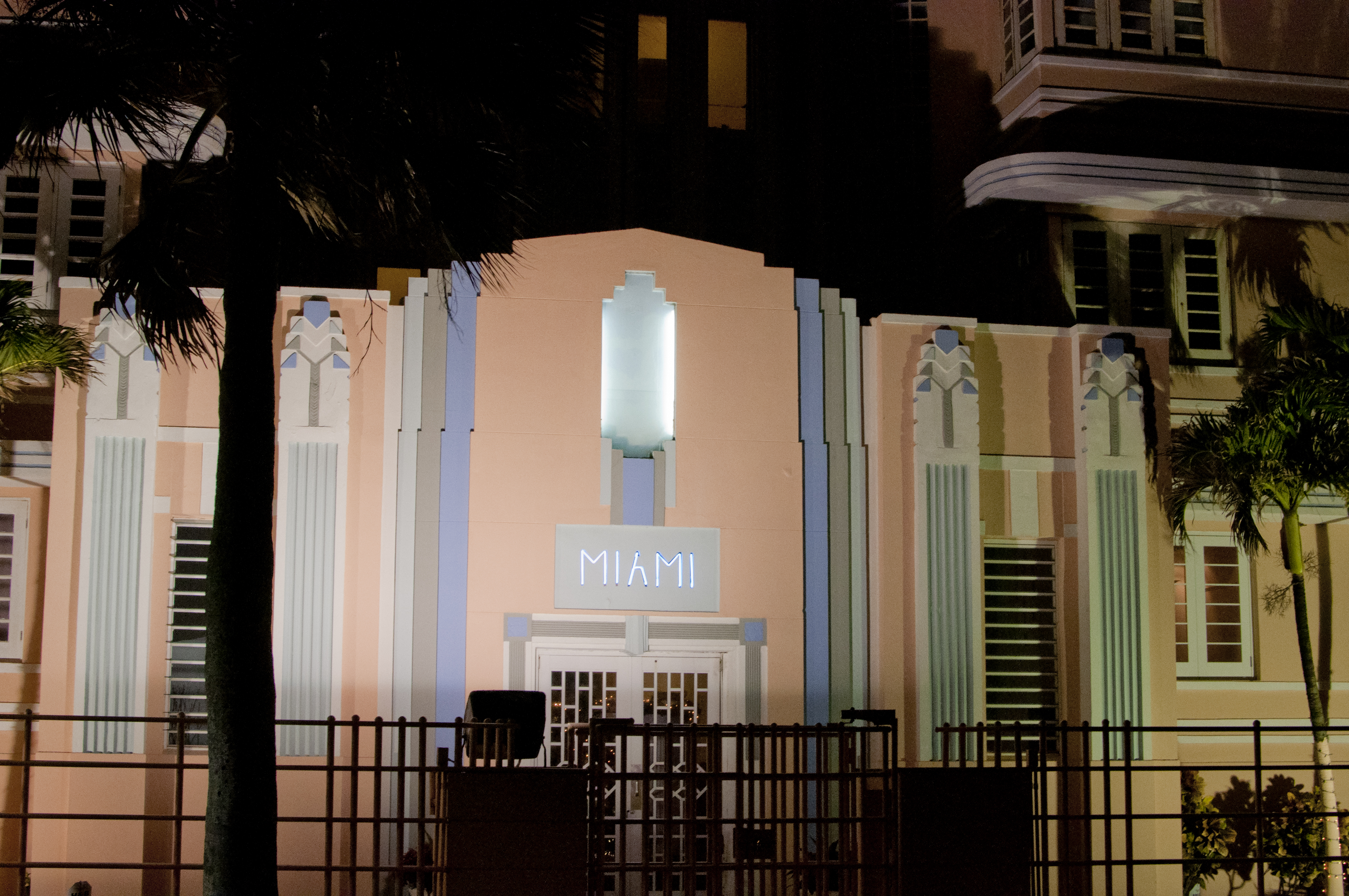

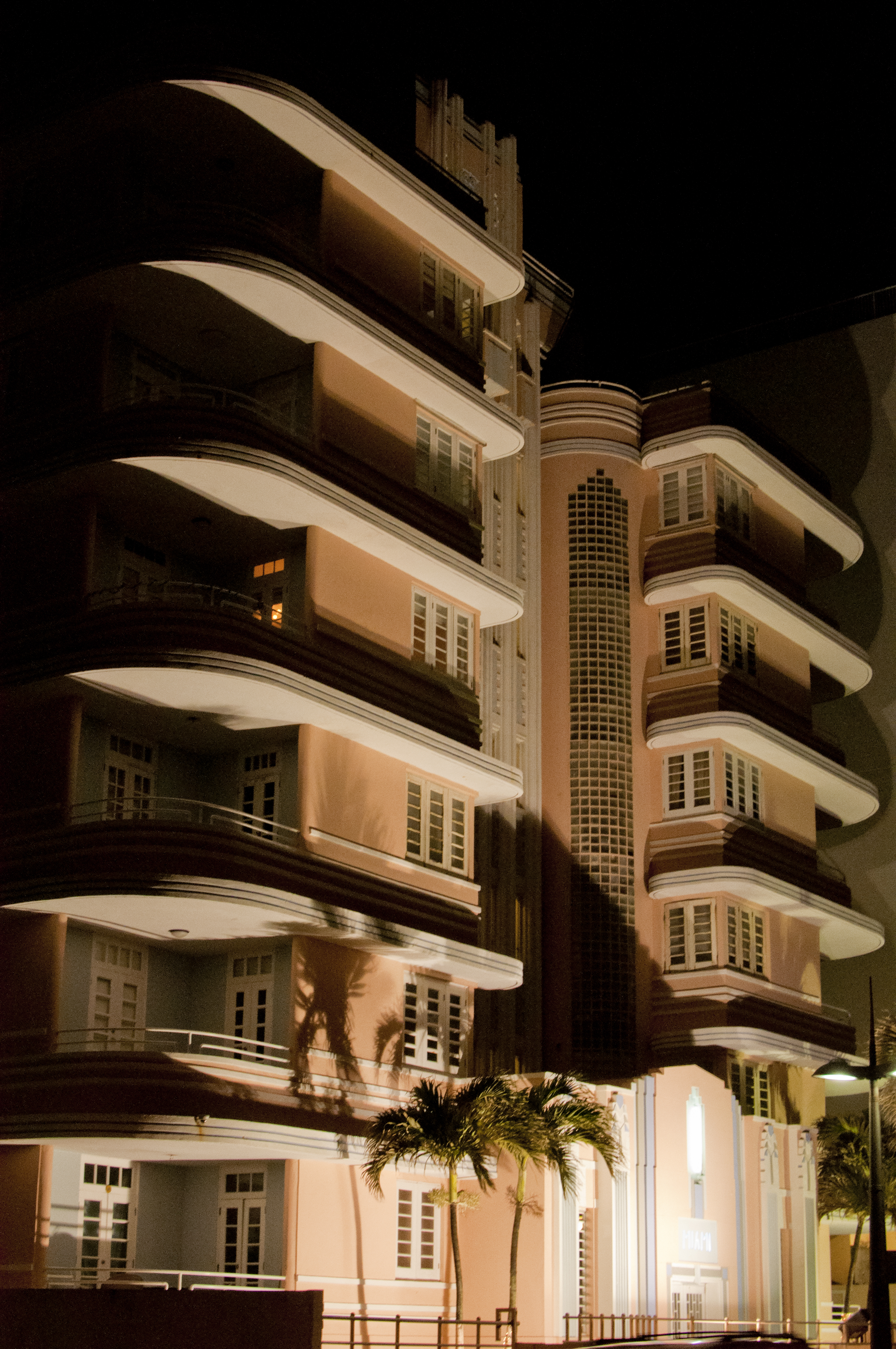

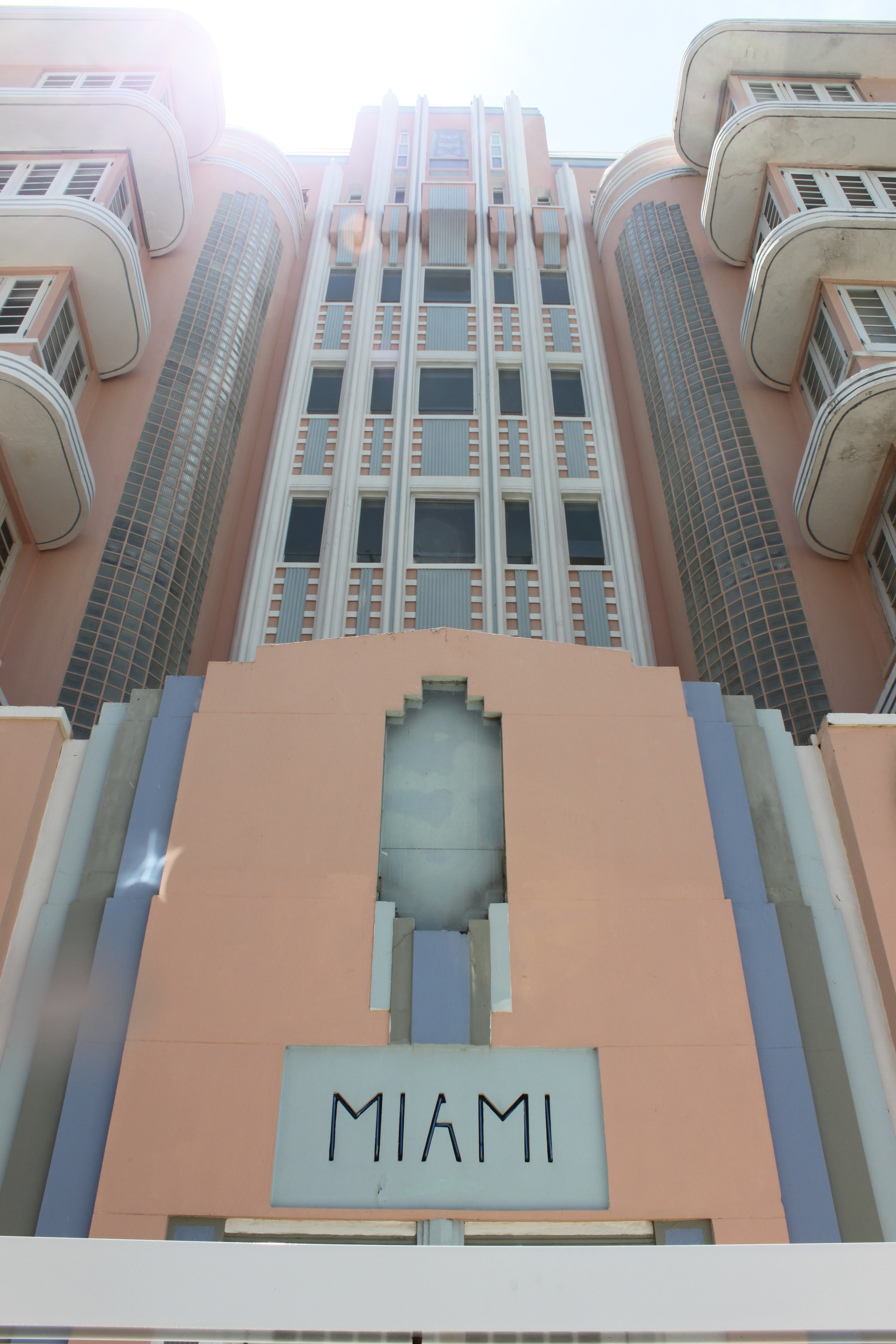

== See also ==
- Architecture of Puerto Rico
- National Register of Historic Places listings in San Juan, Puerto Rico
