= Figueroa Apartments =

- U.S. National Register of Historic Places
- Puerto Rico Historic Sites and Zones
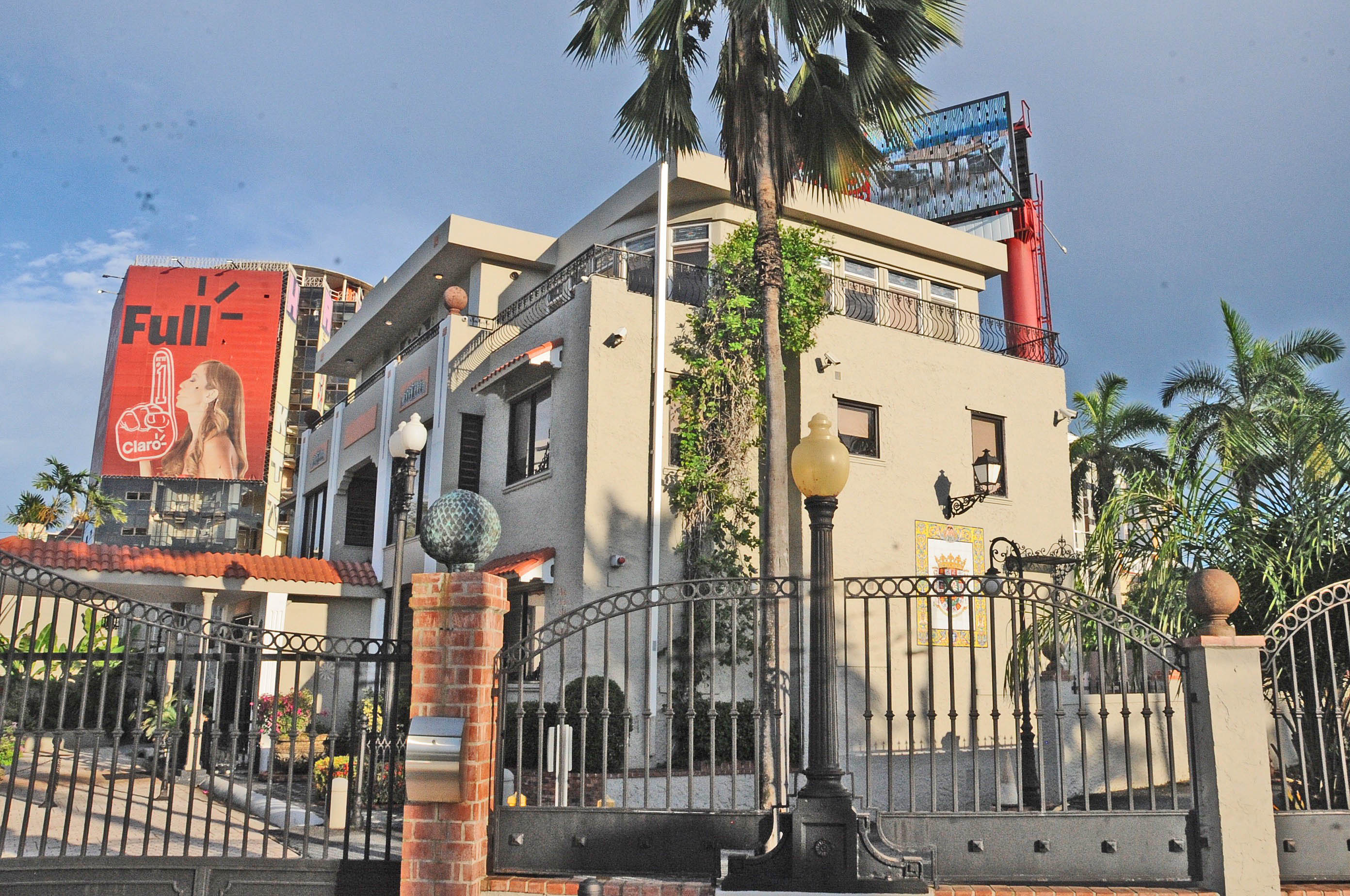
- Figueroa Apartments in 2024

- Location within Puerto Rico
- Location: 601 Fernández Juncos Ave. San Juan, Puerto Rico
- Coordinates: 18°27′26″N 66°05′11″W
- Built: 1935
- Architect: Armando Morales Cano
- Architectural style: Art Deco
- NRHP reference No.: 00001124
- RNSZH No.: 2004-18-02-JP-SH

Significant dates
- Added to NRHP: September 14, 2000
- Designated RNSZH: August 19, 2004

Figueroa Apartments, better known today as the Pinto-Lugo & Rivera Building (Spanish: Edificio Pinto-Lugo y Rivera), is a historic Art Deco-style building located in the Isla Grande district of Santurce in the city of San Juan, Puerto Rico. The apartments were built in 1935 based on an Art Deco design by architect Armando Morales Cano with elements Spanish Revival style. It was built at a time when the Miramar district of Santurce was rapidly expanding, specially along the Fernández Juncos and Ponce de León avenues. The building today is no longer residential, and it hosts private office spaces. It was added to the National Register of Historic Places in 2000 and to the Puerto Rico Register of Historic Sites and Zones in 2004.

== See also ==
- Architecture of Puerto Rico
