= Mural "La Familia" =

Mural by Rafael Ríos Rey in San Juan

La Familia
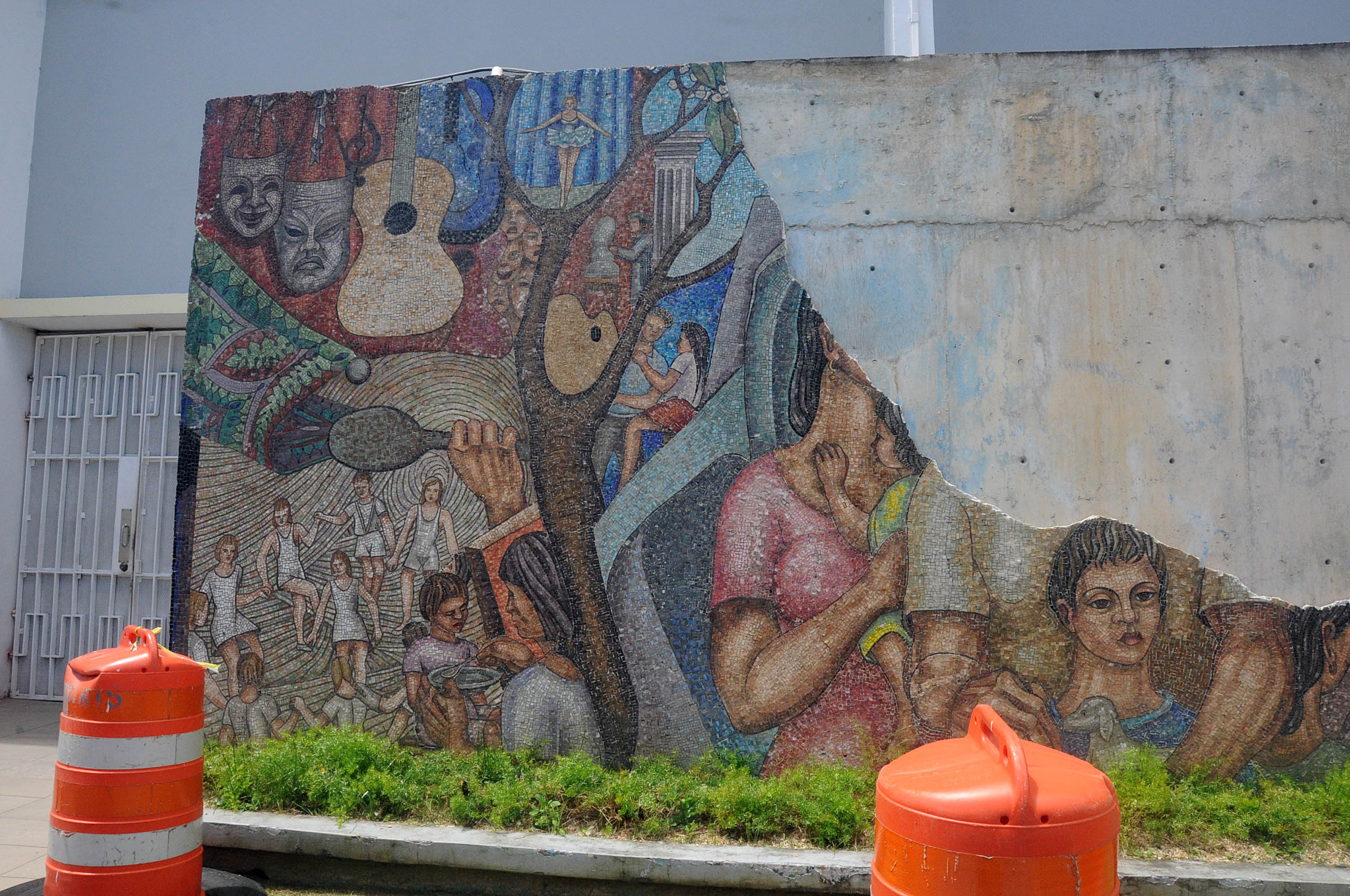
- La Familia in the aftermath of Hurricane Maria
- Artist: Rafael Ríos Rey
- Year: 1970
- Medium: Mosaic tile mural
- Condition: Damaged since 2017
- Location: Centro de Servicios Múltiples de Barrio Obrero, San Juan, Puerto Rico; 18.4375241°N 66.0549357°W
- Mural "La Famila"
- U.S. National Register of Historic Places
- Location within Puerto Rico
- NRHP reference No.: 100001763
- Added to NRHP: October 23, 2017

La Familia (Spanish for 'The Family') is a mural by Puerto Rican muralist Rafael Ríos Rey located in the Barrio Obrero Community Center (Centro de Servicios Múltiples de Barrio Obrero) in Santurce, in the city of San Juan, Puerto Rico. The mural depicts various scenes from the history of Puerto Rico with references to the popular culture, arts and folklore of the island. The centerpiece of the mural is a traditional working-class family, the namesake of the artwork. La Familia was commissioned by the municipal government of San Juan for the exterior of the newly built community center at Barrio Obrero, a working-class neighborhood of Santurce. The mural was greatly affected by Hurricane Maria in 2017. That same year it was added to the National Register of Historic Places (NRHP) in 2017 where it is described as a superb example of Venetian mosaics art form in Puerto Rico and as one of the most influential works of art created by Rafael Ríos Rey. Other murals also created by Ríos Rey located in the Ponce YMCA and Edificio Empresas Ferré have also been distinguished by the National Park Service and listed into the NRHP.

== See also ==
- Puerto Rican art
- San Juan Municipality
