= Puerto Rico National Library =

Library in San Juan, Puerto Rico

- Carcel de Puerta de Tierra
- U.S. National Register of Historic Places
- U.S. Historic district – Contributing property
- Puerto Rico Historic Sites and Zones
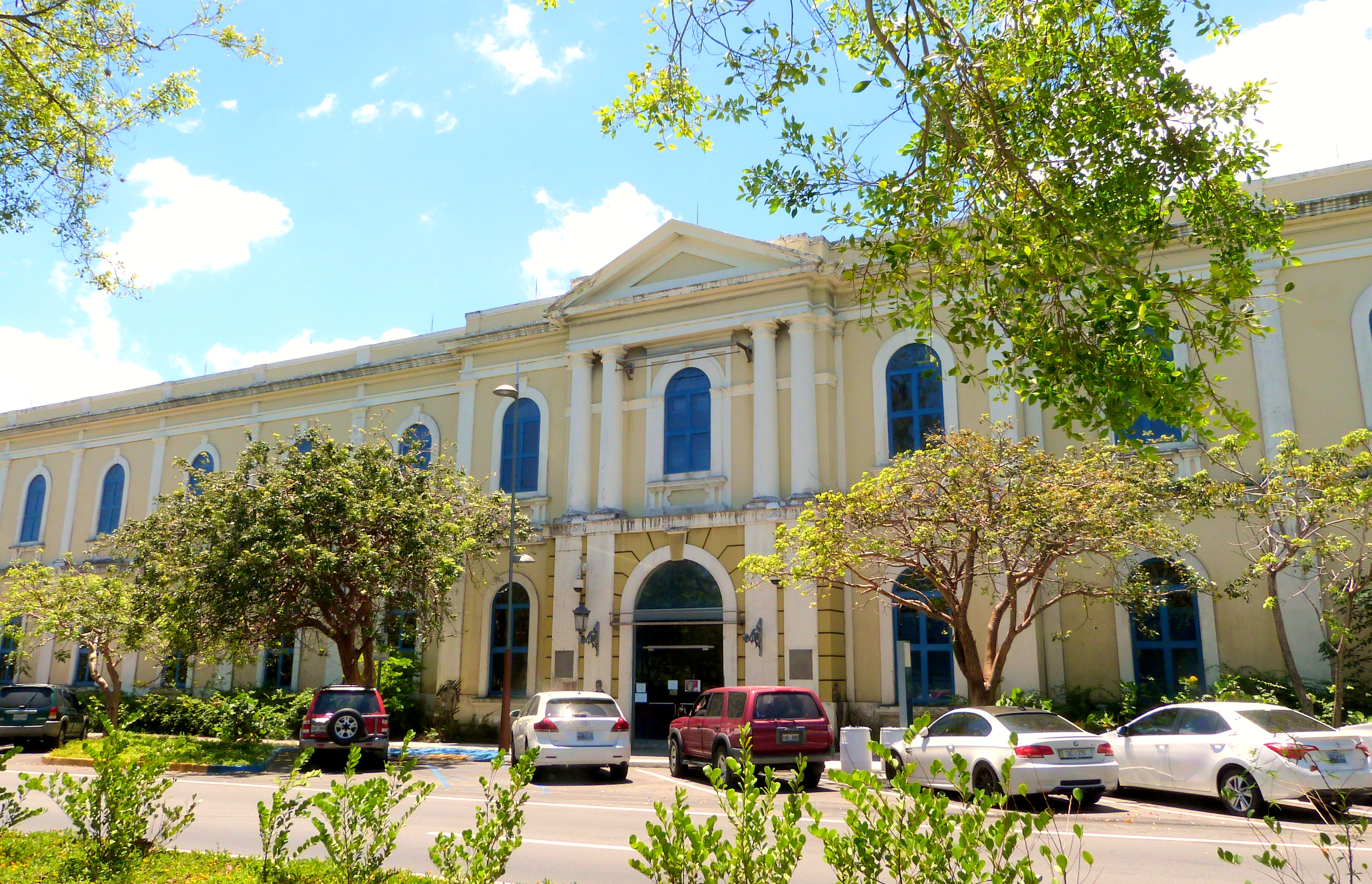
- Biblioteca Nacional de Puerto Rico in San Juan, 2017

- Location within Puerto Rico
- Location: Ponce de León Avenue, Stop 8 San Juan Antiguo, San Juan, Puerto Rico
- Coordinates: 18.4638°N 66.0923°W
- Built: 1887
- Architect: Domingo Sermero
- Architectural style: Spanish Neoclassical
- Part of: Puerta de Tierra Historic District (ID100002936)
- NRHP reference No.: 76002253
- RNSZH No.: 2000-(RMSJ)-00-JP-SH

Significant dates
- Added to NRHP: August 11, 1976
- Designated CP: October 15, 2019
- Designated RNSZH: February 3, 2000

The Puerto Rico National Library (Spanish: Biblioteca Nacional de Puerto Rico) is the national library of Puerto Rico. It was created in 1967 as the Biblioteca General de Puerto Rico (Puerto Rico General Library) by Joint Resolution No. 44 of the Puerto Rico Legislature. It opened on April 11, 1973. In 2003 it was renamed Biblioteca Nacional de Puerto Rico by Act 188 of August 17 of that year. The library is ascribed to the Institute of Puerto Rican Culture.

The Library shares its nineteenth-century classical building, (at one time the Bacardi Rum flagship factory), with the General Archives of Puerto Rico. The Library's specialized collections include the Dominican Collection of leather-bound religious books dating from the 16th-19th centuries, the Eugenio Maria de Hostos Collection, which includes 1,300 digitized manuscripts, and the private collection of Concha Meléndez, literary critic and former professor at the University of Puerto Rico.

The building is located in the Puerta de Tierra historic district on the Islet of San Juan. It faces the Luis Muñoz Rivera Park. It is fully air‐conditioned and has free Internet access. The Library and Archives share a 119-seat amphitheater at street level where each one has its individual side desk, with an unobstructed view. The building was listed on the National Register of Historic Places in 1976 under its former name, Carcel de Puerta de Tierra, and on the Puerto Rico Register of Historic Sites and Zones in 2000 under the name Archivo y Biblioteca General.

== See also ==
- List of libraries in the United States

== Bibliography ==
- Haidée Muñoz Solá (1992). "Biblioteca Nacional de Puerto Rico" (PDF). Boletín de la ANABAD (in Spanish). 42. Madrid: Asociación Española de Archiveros, Bibliotecarios, Museólogos y Documentalistas. ISSN 0210-4164 – via University of La Rioja.
