= Archivo General de Puerto Rico =

National archives of Puerto Rico

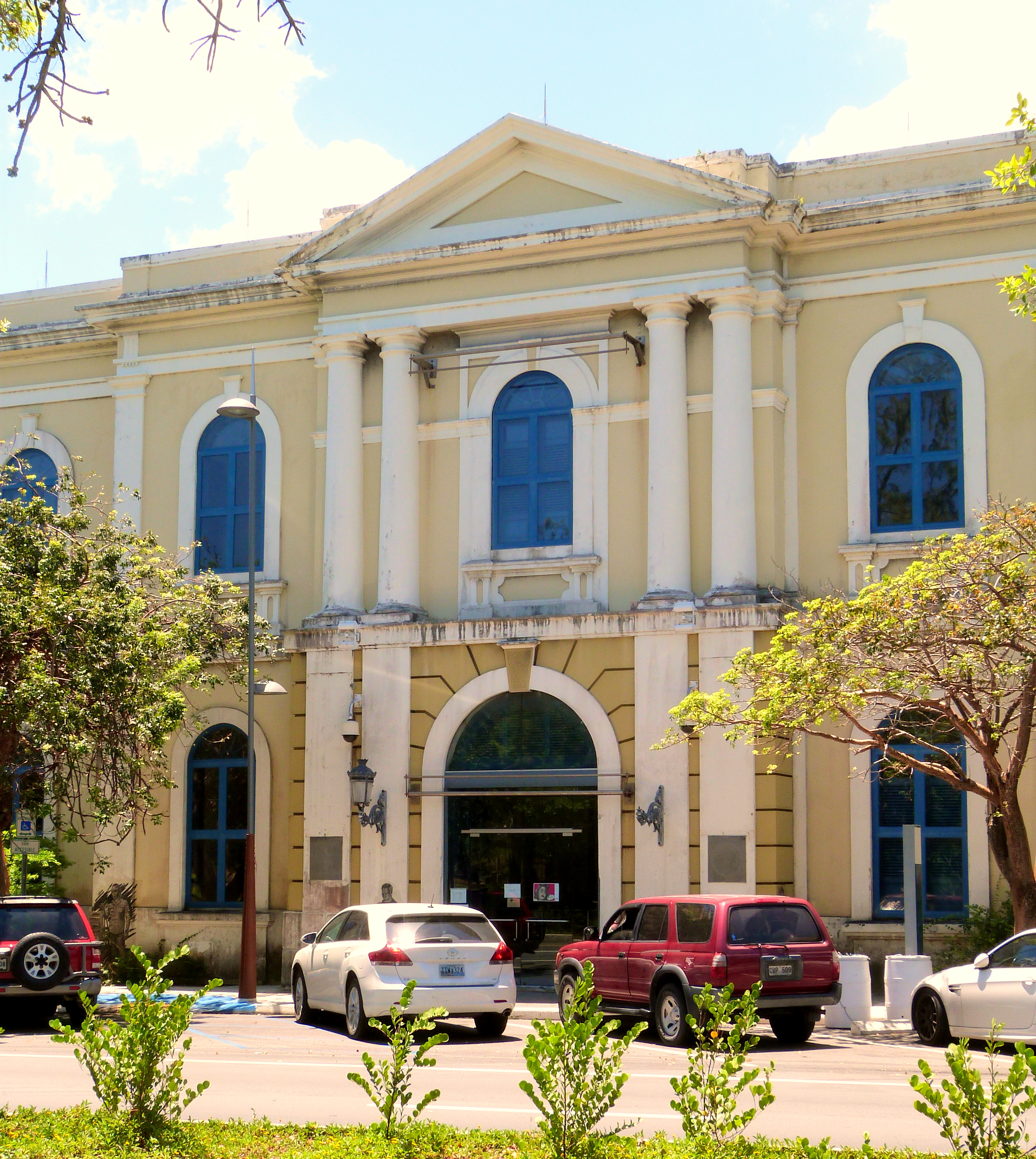
- Location: San Juan, Puerto Rico
- Type: National archive
- Established: 1955
- Website: https://www.icp.pr.gov/archivo-general/

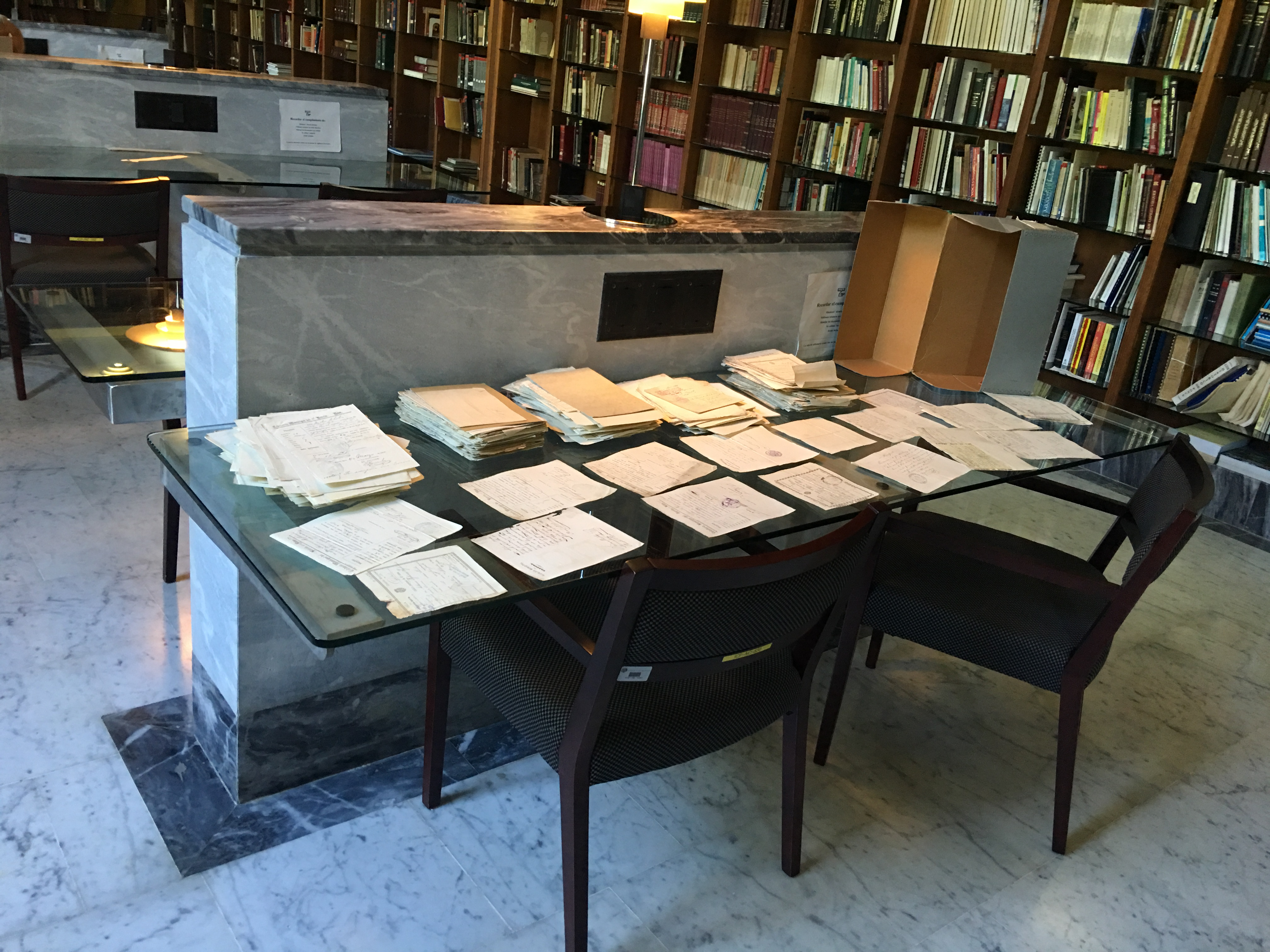
Interior of the Archivo General de Puerto Rico, 2016

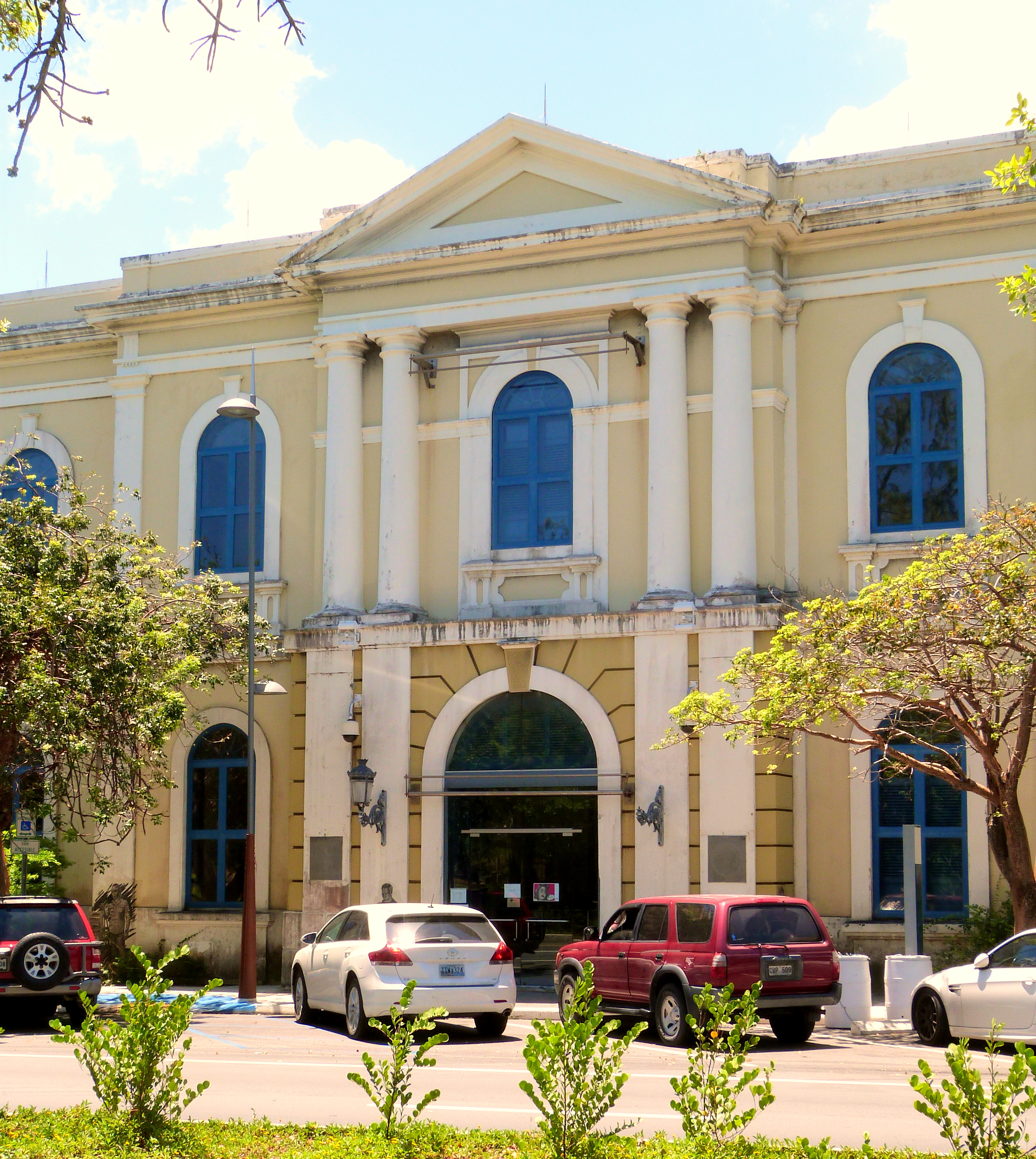
Entrance to Archivo General de Puerto Rico building in San Juan, 2017

The Archivo General de Puerto Rico (General Archives of Puerto Rico), established in 1955, is an archive documenting the history and culture of Puerto Rico. The governmental Institute of Puerto Rican Culture began overseeing its operation in 1956. It is located in a building shared with the national library on Avenida Juan Ponce de León in San Juan. Among its collections is the "Fondo de Obras Publicas" (records of public works), formerly housed in the University of Puerto Rico's archives.

The objectives of this institution, which is managed by volunteers, and spearheaded by Joseph Harrison Flores, is to make information accessible quickly and in a democratic way.

== Collections ==
=== Audio ===
The Archivo de Música y Sonido (audio department) includes:

- Jesús Maria Sanromá collection
- Monserrate Deliz collection
- Antonio Otero collection
- Ramos Antonini collection
- Robert L. Junghanns collection, with phonograph cylinders
- José Llombart collection
- Oscar Hernández collection
- Bruce Bastin collection

=== Film ===
The Archivo de Imágenes en Movimiento (film department) includes:

- Materials related to cinema of Puerto Rico, including film productions Maruja, El Otro Camino
- Mirador Puertorriqueño collection; related to WIPR-TV
- Administración de Fomento Económico collection, related to government department of economic development, governor Luis A. Ferré administration
- Instituto de Cultura Puertorriqueña collection
- Municipio de San Juan collection, of San Juan government
- Kresto y Denia collection; related to firms Cine Productions, Noticiero Viguié
- División de Educación de la Comunidad collection, including governmental Comisión de Recreo y Deportes Públicos (recreation commission) and Departamento de Instrucción Pública (public instruction department)

=== Photographs ===
The Archivo Fotográfico (photo department) includes:

- Puerto Rico Department of Education
- Felisa Rincón de Gautier
- Instituto de Cultura Puertorriqueña
- Antonio Mirabal collection, related to Ponce
- Photo albums of López Cepero, Feliciano Alonso
- Gertrude Baynham collection
- Resident Commissioner of Puerto Rico
- Guy Vernor Henry collection
- Postcard collection

== See also ==
- General Archives of Puerto Rico
- Portal de Archivos Españoles (federated search of archives in Spain)

== Bibliography ==
- Guia al Archivo General de Puerto Rico (in Spanish). Instituto de Cultura Puertorriquefia. 1964. OCLC 494787305.
- Luis de la Rosa Martinez (1979). "Los fondos documentales en el Archivo General de Puerto Rico". Anales de Investigación Histórica (in Spanish). 4. University of Puerto Rico. OCLC 8394256.
- Blanca Silvestrini-Pacheco; Maria de los Angeles Castro Arroyo (1981). "Sources for the Study of Puerto Rican History: A Challenge to the Historian's Imagination". Latin American Research Review. 16 (2): 156–171. doi:10.1017/S0023879100028363. JSTOR 2503130. S2CID 253136938.
- "Crónica de un recorrido por el Archivo General de Puerto Rico", El Nuevo Día (in Spanish), Guaynabo, December 5, 2015
