= Casa Vigil =

Historic house in San Juan, Puerto Rico

- U.S. National Register of Historic Places
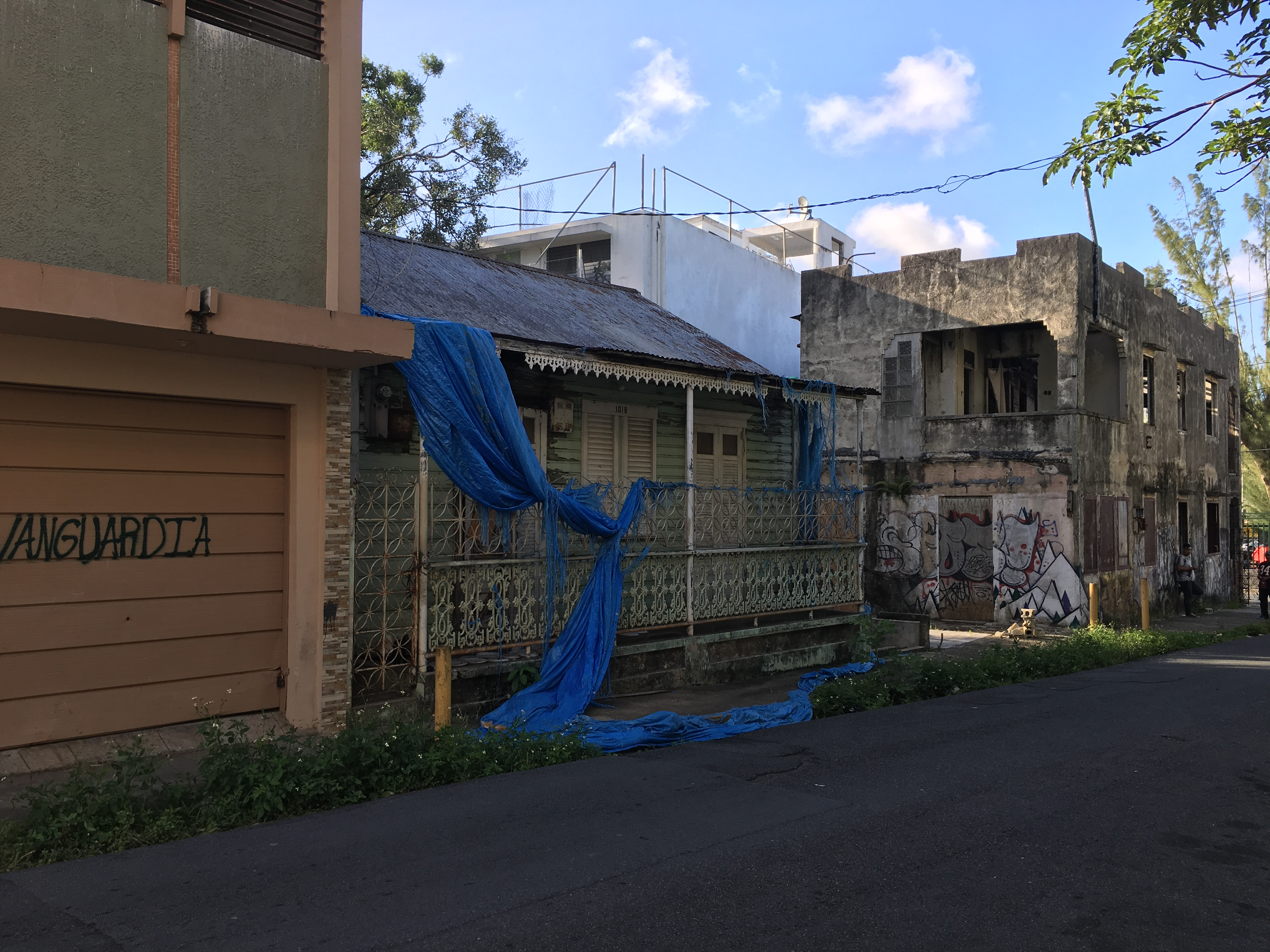
- Casa Vigil in 2018

- Location within Puerto Rico
- Location: 1018 Calle Ferrocarril San Juan, Puerto Rico
- Coordinates: 18.40°N 66.0497222°W
- Built: 1898
- Architect: Alejandro and Francisco Vigil y Lorenzo
- Architectural style: Criollo Vernacular
- NRHP reference No.: 100002694
- Added to NRHP: July 23, 2018

The Vigil House (Spanish: Casa Vigil) is a historic late 19th-century residence located in the Pueblo barrio, the former administrative and historic center of the town of Río Piedras before it was incorporated into the municipality of San Juan, Puerto Rico. The house is notable for being highly representative of wooden dwellings of the Puerto Rican middle-class of the time before the trend of concrete constructions of the 20th century. The house today is located a block away from the University of Puerto Rico High School and two blocks away from the University of Puerto Rico, Río Piedras campus. Although it is abandoned today, it is one of the best-preserved vernacular houses (casa criolla) in Río Piedras and it was added to the National Register of Historic Places in 2018.
