= Villa Victoria (San Juan, Puerto Rico) =

- U.S. National Register of Historic Places
- Puerto Rico Historic Sites and Zones
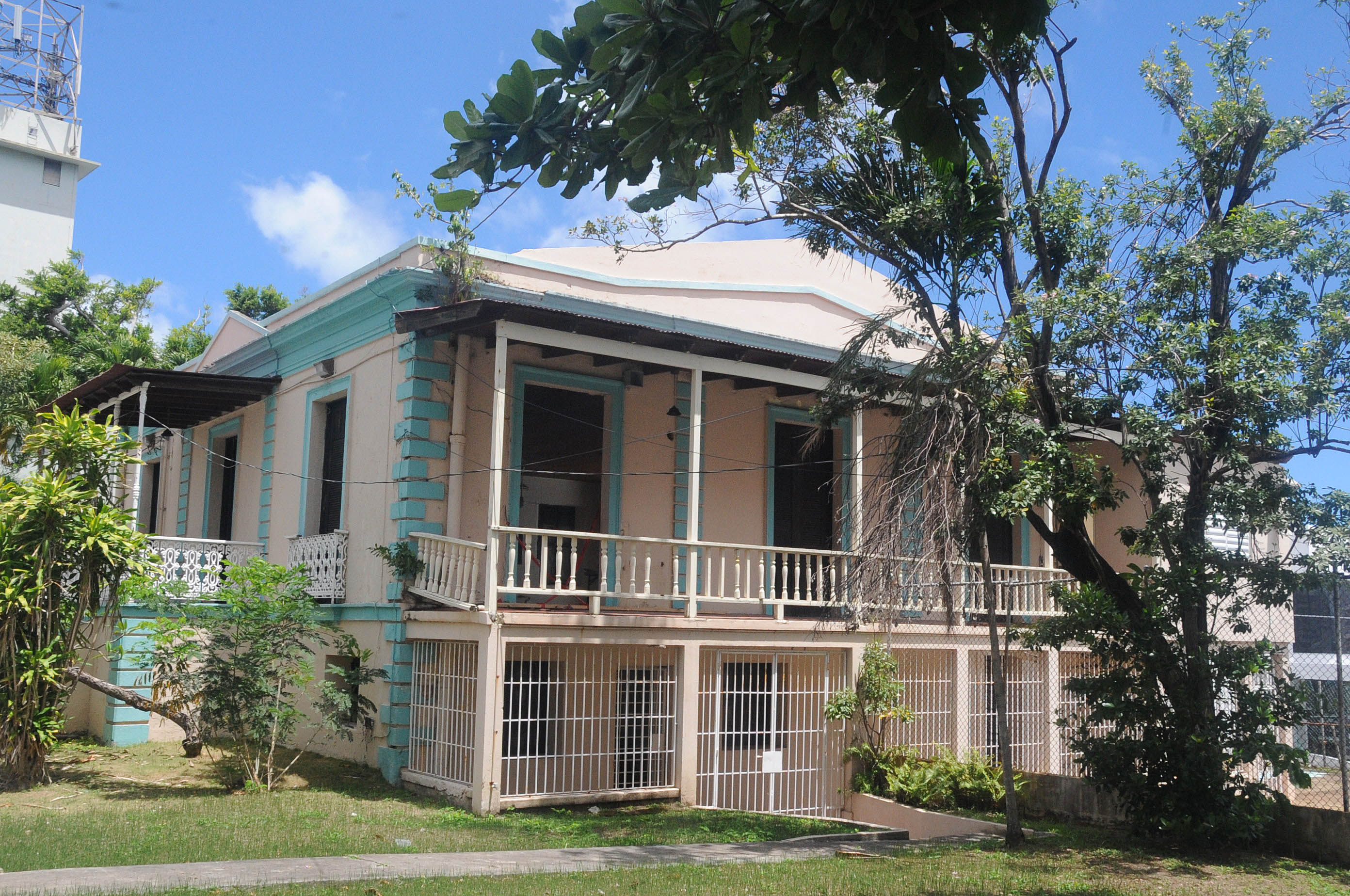
- Villa Victoria in 2018

- Location within Puerto Rico
- Location: 905 Ponce de León Ave. San Juan, Puerto Rico
- Coordinates: 18°27′16″N 66°04′48″W
- Built: Early 20th century
- Architectural style: French Colonial
- NRHP reference No.: 14001135
- RNSZH No.: 2000-(RMSJ)-00-JP-SH

Significant dates
- Added to NRHP: January 6, 2015
- Designated RNSZH: February 3, 2000

Villa Victoria is a historic house located in the Santurce area of the city of San Juan, Puerto Rico. Formerly a private single-family residence, Villa Victoria has served as a local chapter and the San Juan headquarters of the YWCA since 1955, and it was added to the National Register of Historic Places in 2015 and to the Puerto Rico Register of Historic Sites and Zones in 2000.

Built in a French Colonial-style popular at the time, Villa Victoria dates to the early 20th-century. No record of the architect or builder exists, but records from 1917 show that it was built at a time of urban residential expansion in the Miramar area of Santurce which was the result of a population boom and the establishment of the Carretera Central that linked San Juan to Ponce. Although built after the American occupation of Puerto Rico, its building methods evoke the traditional techniques of residential building construction from the Spanish colonial period during the 19th century. This type of residential construction was very typical in Miramar during the period between 1900 and 1920. Its first documented owners were Thomas George Waymouth and his wife, of the Waymouth Estate Company, followed by Ramón Mora and wife Teresa Nicolao. Records show that in 1940 it was bought by Jenaro Suárez and wife Ethel Natalie Wigmore, under whom Villa Victoria underwent numerous renovations with the addition of plumbing and electrical infrastructure. It was then purchased by Irma Cuevas de Kearney and Marianne Goettsch in 1955 on behalf of the YWCA, when the internal partitions of the first floor were demolished. Today it remains as the Puerto Rico headquarters of said organization and it also hosts a local chapter.
