= Francisco Valinés Cofresí =

Puerto Rican architect

- Born: October 4, 1878; Cabo Rojo, Puerto Rico
- Died: August 15, 1949 (aged 70); San Juan, Puerto Rico
- Occupation: architect

Francisco Valinés Cofresí (1878–1949) was a Puerto Rican architect.

== Biography ==
He was born in Cabo Rojo in 1878. His mother's family were relatives of the outlaw and pirate Roberto Cofresí.

Cofresí began working as a cabinetmaker foreman at the San Juan firm Finlay, Waymouth & Lee. Later on he studied architecture by correspondence, with the International Correspondence School of Chicago, Illinois, completing his studies in 1912.

At least two of his works are listed for their architecture on the U.S. National Register of Historic Places (NRHP).

== Works ==
- his first major work was the Executive Mansion for the governor (la Mansión Ejecutiva of the Gobernador) of the U.S. Virgin Islands, in Saint John
- the residence of José Calderón in Canóvanas
- the residence of Angel Suárez in Guaynabo
- La Giralda, 651 Jose Marti St., Santurce, San Juan, Puerto Rico, NRHP-listed
- Palmira López de Pereyó House, jct. of Font Martelo and Minerva Sts. Humacao, Puerto Rico, NRHP-listed
- Original landscaping for the Luis Muñoz Rivera Park in San Juan, PR
