= Edificio Aboy =

- U.S. National Register of Historic Places
- Puerto Rico Historic Sites and Zones
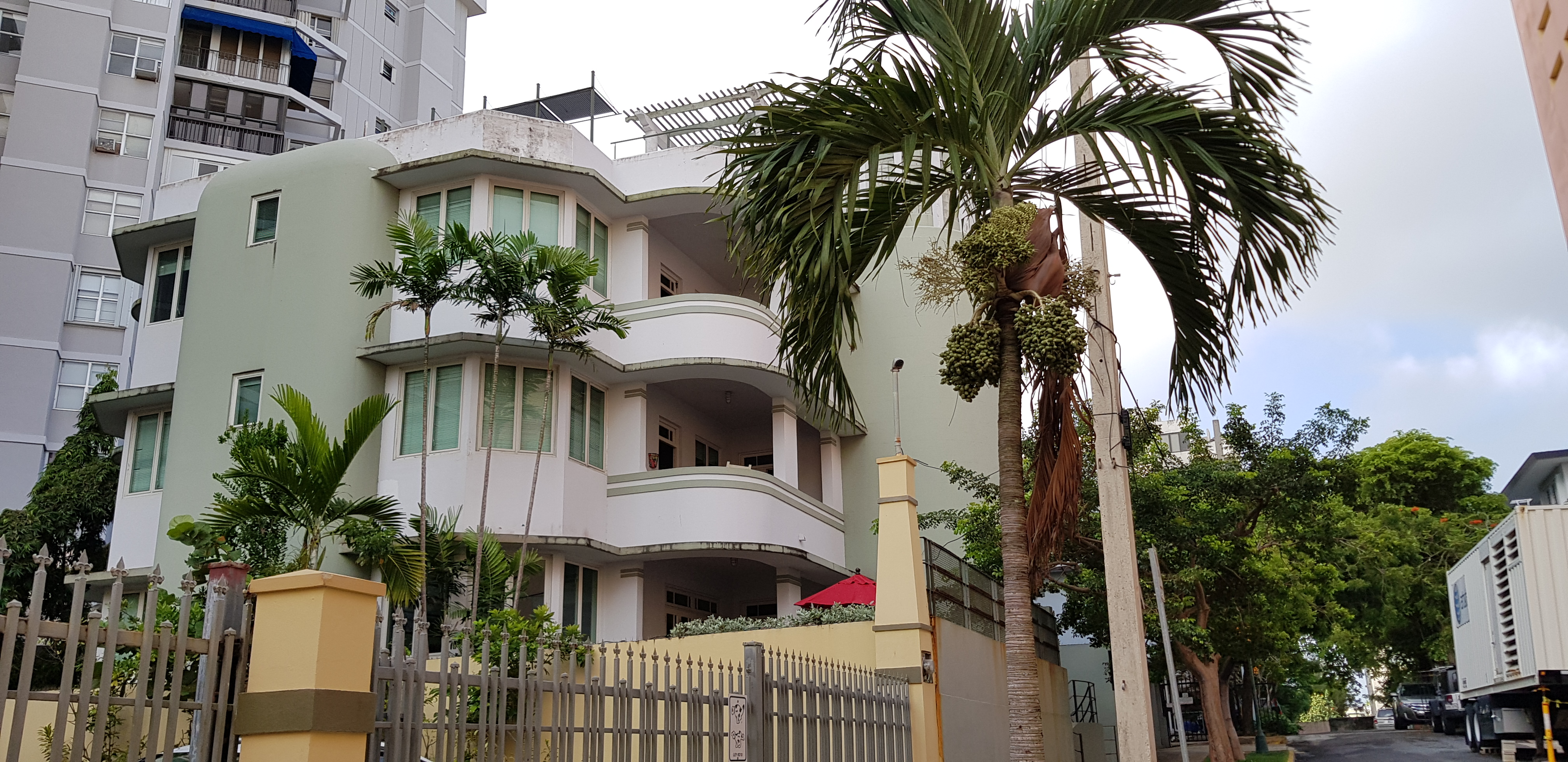
- Edificio Aboy in 2018
- Location: 603 Aboy St., San Juan, Puerto Rico
- Coordinates: 18°27′22″N 66°04′53″W
- Area: less than one acre
- Built: 1937
- Architect: Jorge Julia Pasarell
- Architectural style: Art Deco
- NRHP reference No.: 01001069
- RNSZH No.: 2000-(RMSJ)-00-JP-SH

Significant dates
- Added to NRHP: September 28, 2001
- Designated RNSZH: October 30, 2002

The Edificio Aboy (also El Faro) is a private three-level residence located in San Juan, on the island of Puerto Rico. It is located in Miramar, an area of Santurce, which is a barrio of San Juan.

Made of concrete with metal and wood details, the residence features large bay windows on all floors, and circular balconies that curve around a corner of the building. The Edificio Aboy is one of the best representations of Art Deco style on the island of Puerto Rico.
