= Concha Meléndez =

Puerto Rican writer (1895–1983)

- Dr. Concha Meléndez
- Born: January 21, 1895; Caguas, Puerto Rico
- Died: June 26, 1983 (aged 88); San Juan, Puerto Rico
- Occupations: Poet; writer; educator
- Writing career
- Notable awards: Puerto Rican Academy of Languages; Medal of Literature; Award of Honor

Dr. Concha Meléndez (January 21, 1895 – June 26, 1983) was an educator, poet, and writer. She was the first woman to belong to the Puerto Rican Academy of Languages.

== Early years ==
Meléndez was born and raised in Caguas, Puerto Rico, where she received her primary and secondary education. After graduating from high school she enrolled at the University of Puerto Rico where she earned her teacher's certificate.

Meléndez taught at the university's high school while she continued to pursue her University studies. In 1924, she received her bachelor's degree and soon after went to New York City where she obtained her master's degree in 1926 from Columbia University. She returned to Puerto Rico where she became a professor at the University of Puerto Rico.

Meléndez later went to Mexico where she enrolled in the National University of Mexico (UNAM). In 1932, she became the first woman in the history of Mexico to earn a Doctorate in philosophy and letters.

== Professor Emeritus ==
When she returned to Puerto Rico, the University of Puerto Rico bestowed upon her the title of "Professor Emeritus" in Hispanic-American Literature. She was named director of the Hispanic Studies and Humanities Faculty Department at the university, a position she held between 1940 and 1959. Meléndez also founded a tenured chair on Hispanic-American Literature in the university. In 1964, Meléndez acted as visiting professor at the Middlebury School of Languages in Vermont. Concha Meléndez died in San Juan, Puerto Rico on June 26, 1983.

== Written works ==
Melendez's works have been compiled into 15 volumes by the Editorial Cultural. Amongst these are:

- "Amado Nervo",
- "La Inquietud Sosegada: Poética de Evaristo Ribera Chevremont",
- "Various Hispanic-American Poets",
- "The Act of Storytelling in Puerto Rico",
- "Signs from Iberoamerica",
- "Entrance in Peru",
- "Figuration of Puerto Rico and other studies",
- "Jose de Diego in my Memory",
- "Hispanic-American Literature",
- "Words for Listeners",
- "People and Books",
- "Fiction Literature in Puerto Rico",
- "Poetry in Alfonso Reyes" and
- "Indian Novel in Hispanic-America".

== Honors and distinctions ==
She was the first woman to belong to the Puerto Rican Academy of Languages. Melendez was awarded many honors and distinctions in Puerto Rico and other countries. Among the awards are:

- "Medal of Literature" from the Puerto Rican Ateneo
- "The Diploma of Honor" from the Mexican Academy of Languages
- the "Order of Andres Belloy"
- the "Award of Honor" from the Puerto Rican Ateneo

== Legacy ==
A center of the Biblioteca Nacional de Puerto Rico del Instituto de Cultura Puertorriqueña is named after her. It is located in the Casa Dra. Concha Melendez Ramirez, her home from 1940 until her death, which has been designated a National Historic Landmark. Every year the Coalition of Hispanic American Women of Miami, selects five high school graduates, who will receive the Elena Mederos/Concha Melendez Scholarship for their outstanding academic records. Puerto Rico has a school in San Juan named after her and in Virginia there is also a high school named after her.

== See also ==
- Puerto Rican poetry
- List of Puerto Rican writers
- List of Puerto Ricans
- Puerto Rican literature
- History of women in Puerto Rico
