= House at 659 Concordia Street =

Historic house in San Juan, Puerto Rico

- U.S. National Register of Historic Places
- Puerto Rico Historic Sites and Zones
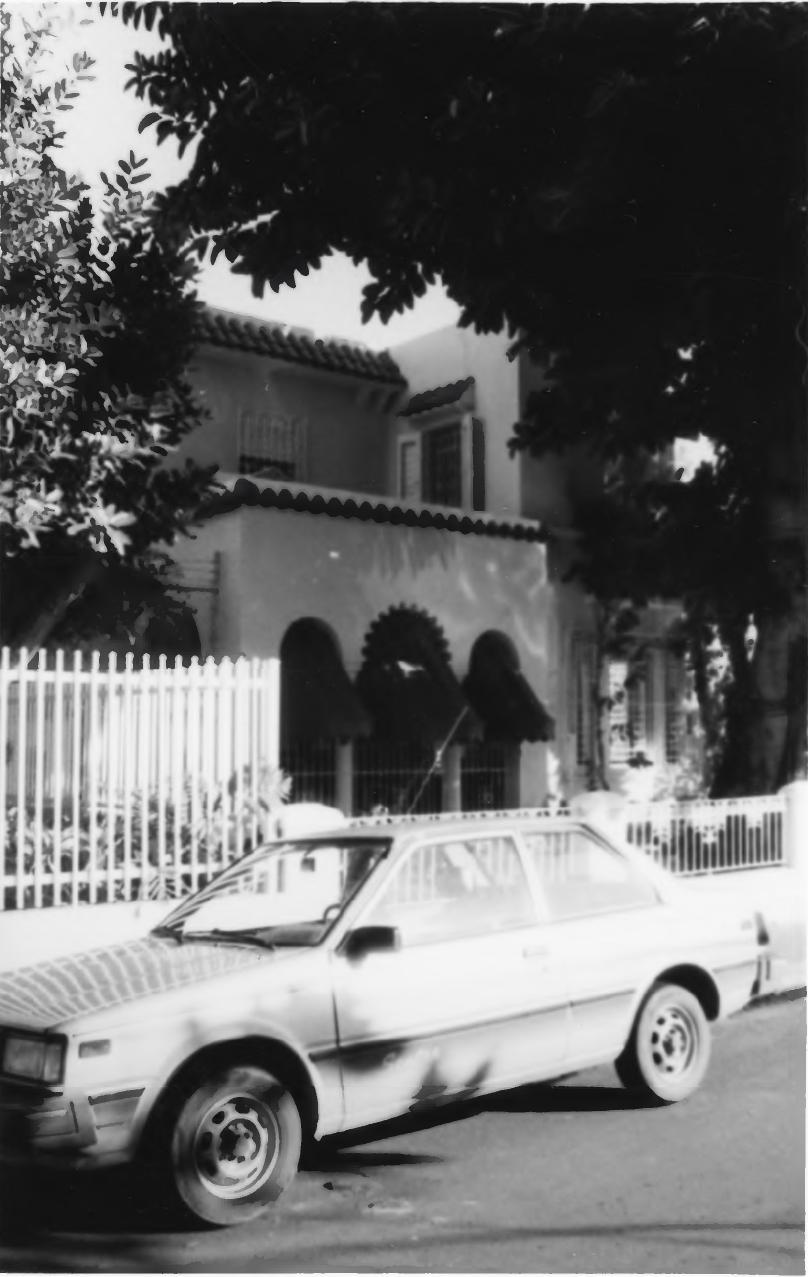
- The house in 1991.

- Location within Puerto Rico
- Location: 659 Concordia Street San Juan, Puerto Rico
- Coordinates: 18°27′09″N 66°04′56″W
- Built: 1935
- Architect: Joseph O'Kelly
- Architectural style: Mission Revival
- NRHP reference No.: 91001501
- RNSZH No.: 2000-(RMSJ)-00-JP-SH

Significant dates
- Added to NRHP: October 18, 1991
- Designated RNSZH: February 3, 2000

659 Concordia is a historic Mission Revival house located in Miramar, a historic residential area of Santurce in the city of San Juan, Puerto Rico. The house was built in 1935 from a design render by architect Joseph O'Kelly, a Columbia University-graduate who moved to Puerto Rico in 1922 and became involved in the construction of several notorious projects such as the Capitol of Puerto Rico and several structures in the University of Puerto Rico, Río Piedras campus. The residence, along with others in the area designed by Puerto Rican architect Pedro Adolfo de Castro, helped usher the Mission Revival style in the island.

== See also ==
- House at 663 La Paz Street
- House at 659 La Paz Street
