= Casa de España =

Historic building in San Juan, Puerto Rico

- U.S. National Register of Historic Places
- U.S. Historic district – Contributing property
- Puerto Rico Historic Sites and Zones
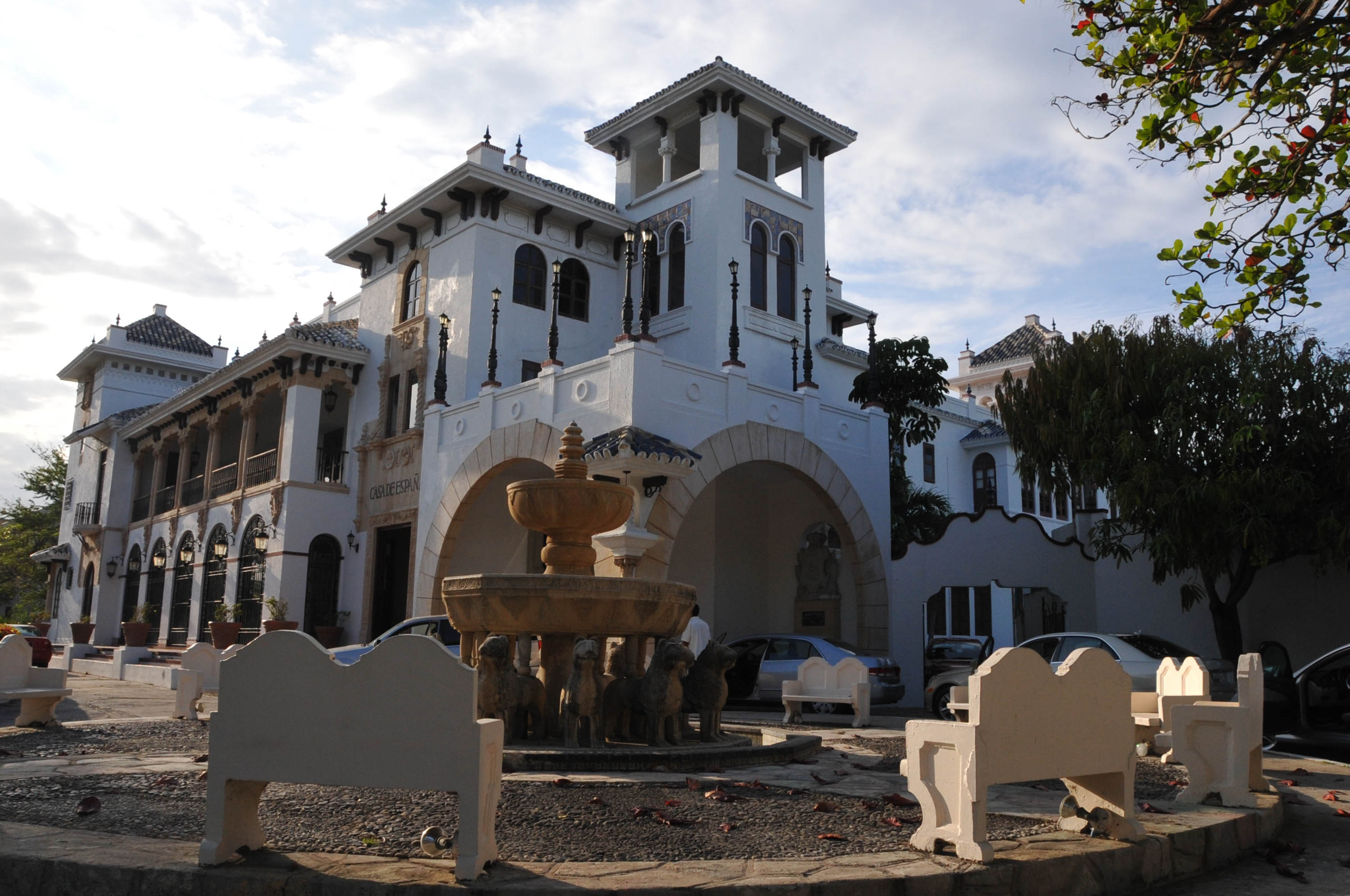
- Casa de España in March 2013

- Location within Puerto Rico
- Location: Ponce de León Ave., San Juan, Puerto Rico
- Coordinates: 18°27′59″N 66°06′29″W
- Built: 1934
- Architect: de Castro, Pedro
- Architectural style: Exotic Revival, Moorish Revival
- Part of: Puerta de Tierra Historic District (ID100002936)
- NRHP reference No.: 83002294
- RNSZH No.: 2000-(RMSJ)-00-JP-SH

Significant dates
- Added to NRHP: July 5, 1983
- Designated CP: October 15, 2019
- Designated RNSZH: February 3, 2000

Casa de España is the headquarters of a private social organization whose members are those of Spanish descent in San Juan, Puerto Rico on Avenida de La Constitución in Old San Juan.

== History ==
The building was designed in a Moorish Revival style by architect Pedro Adolfo de Castro. The building dates from 1934. Although it is named "Casa", it has never been a dwelling place for a family; rather it is a "house" whose members claim common ancestry. It was listed on the National Register of Historic Places in 1983, nd on the Puerto Rico Register of Historic Sites and Zones in 2000. It is not open to the public, but private affairs may be arranged.

=== Architectural details ===
The building is a "typical" Moorish palace that is 119 feet (36 m) wide by 158 feet (48 m) long, with an interior rectangular courtyard, 51 feet (16 m) by 85 feet (26 m) long.

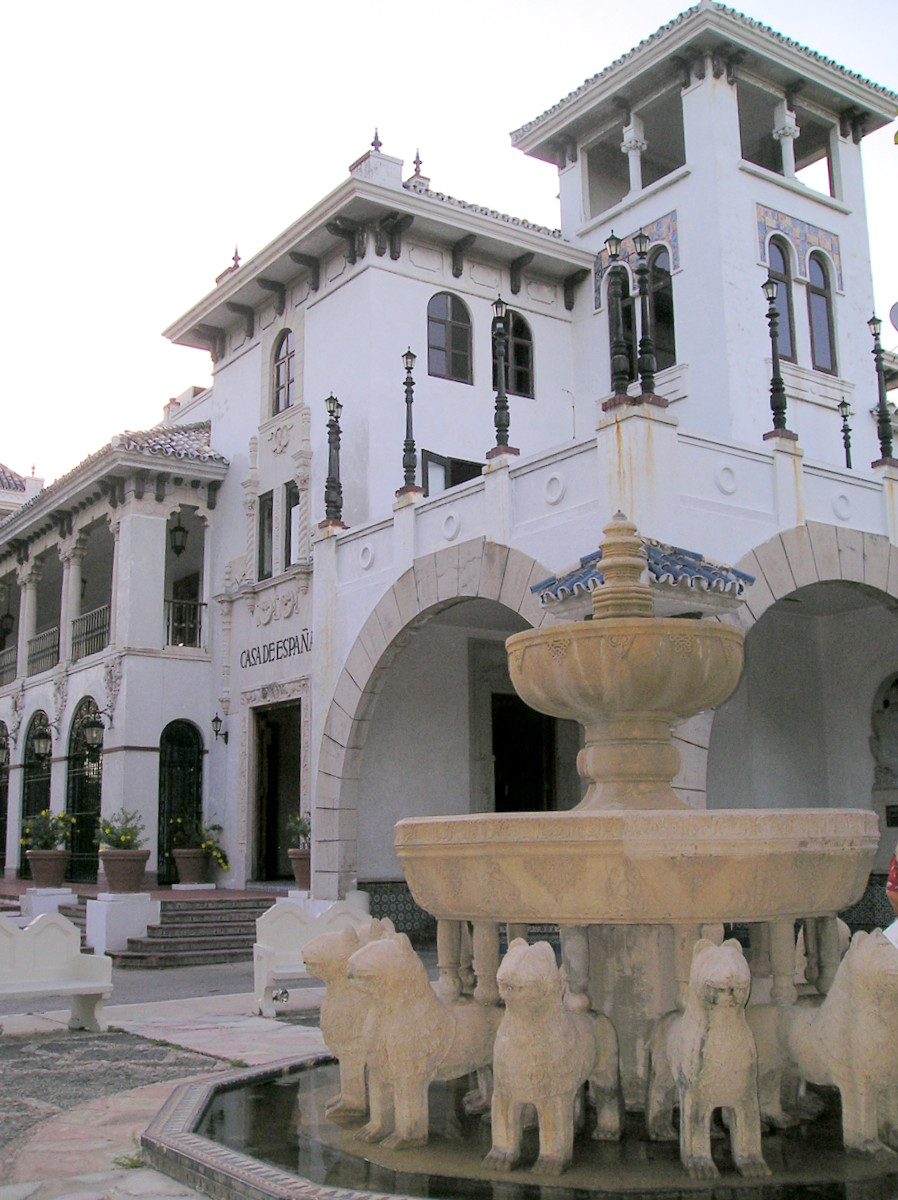
Fountain of the lions.

The fountain design outside the entrance is a copy of one in the "Patio de los Leones" at La Alhambra in Granada, Spain.

== Media ==
The interior courtyard was used to film two coronation scenes for the Disney Channel Original Movie "Princess Protection Program" (2008).

== Gallery ==
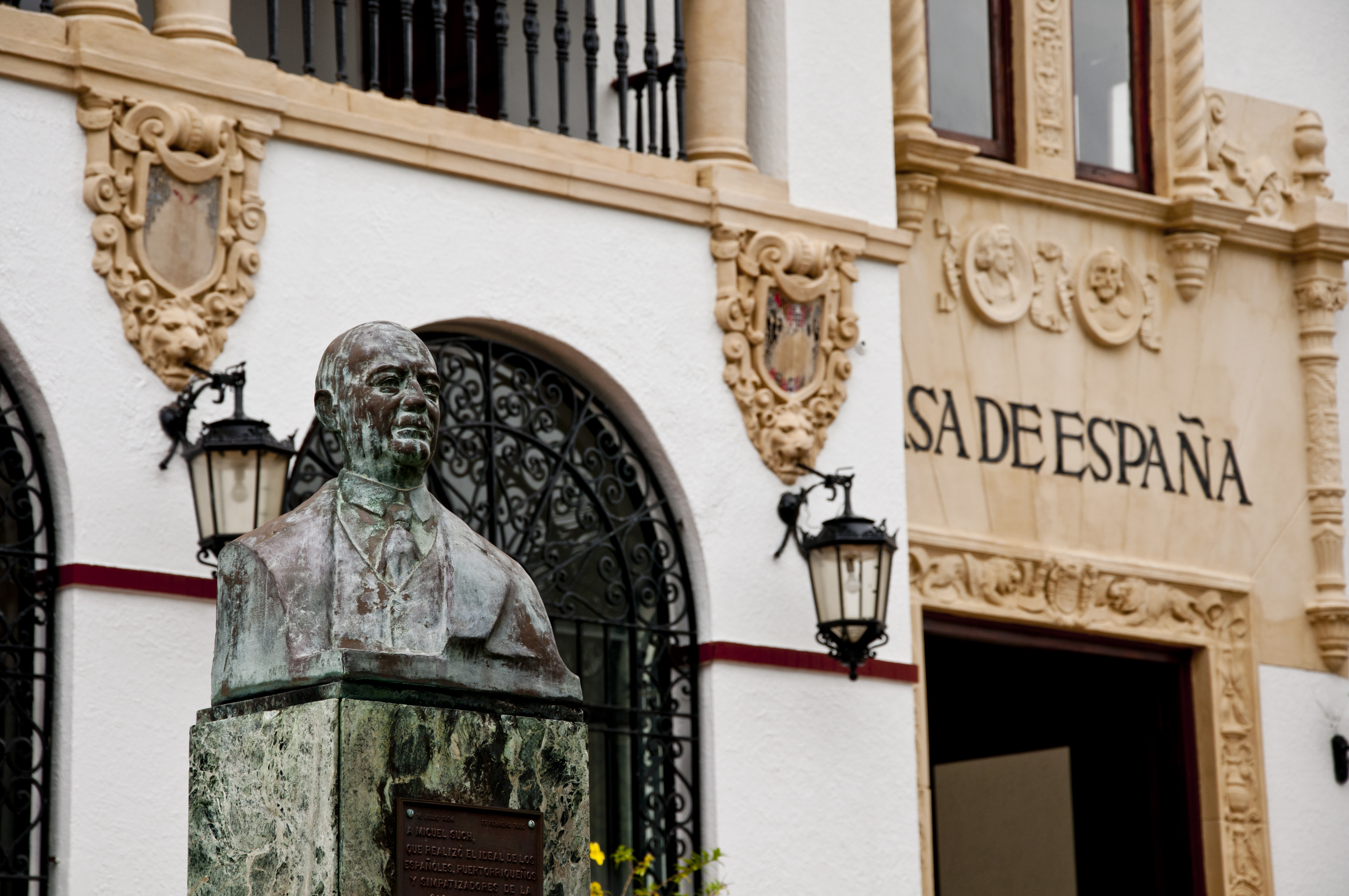
Casa de España in San Juan

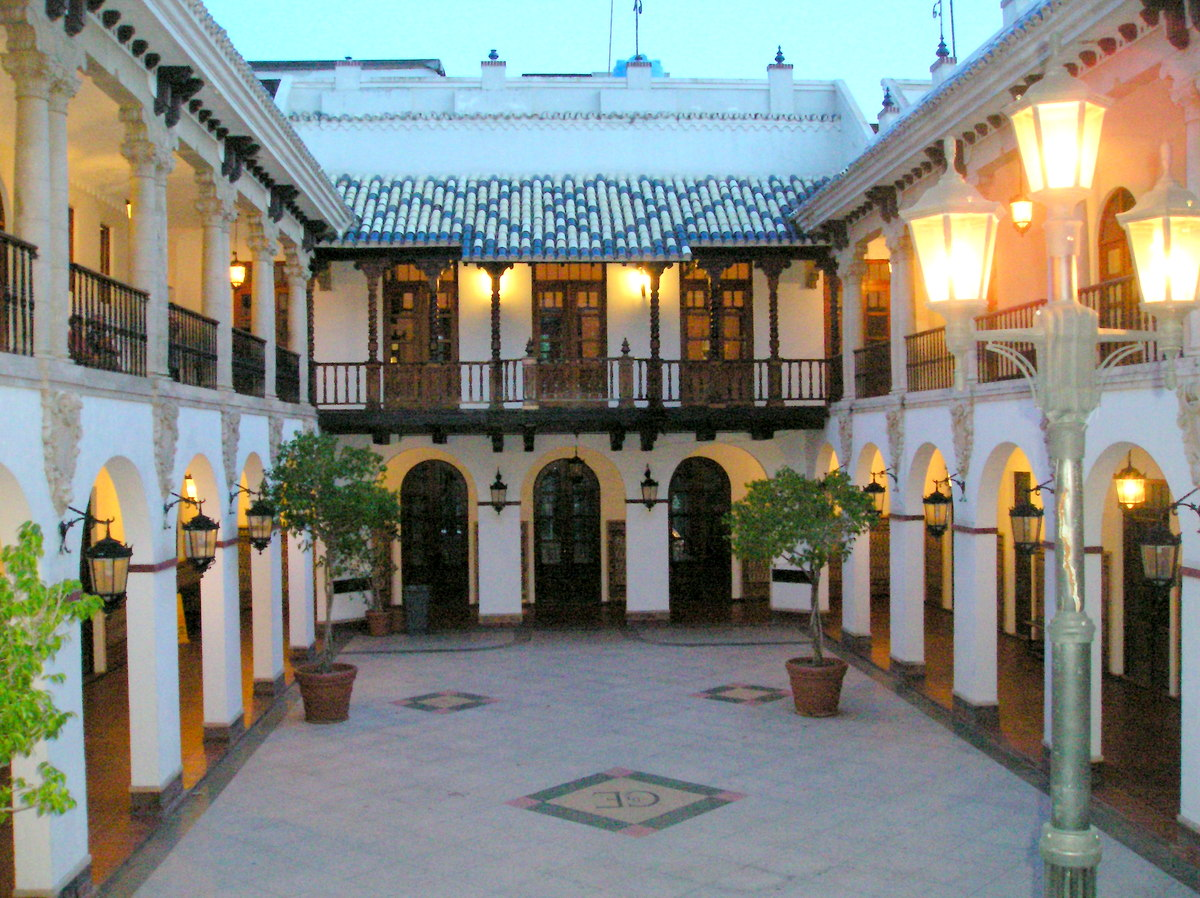
Interior of the building

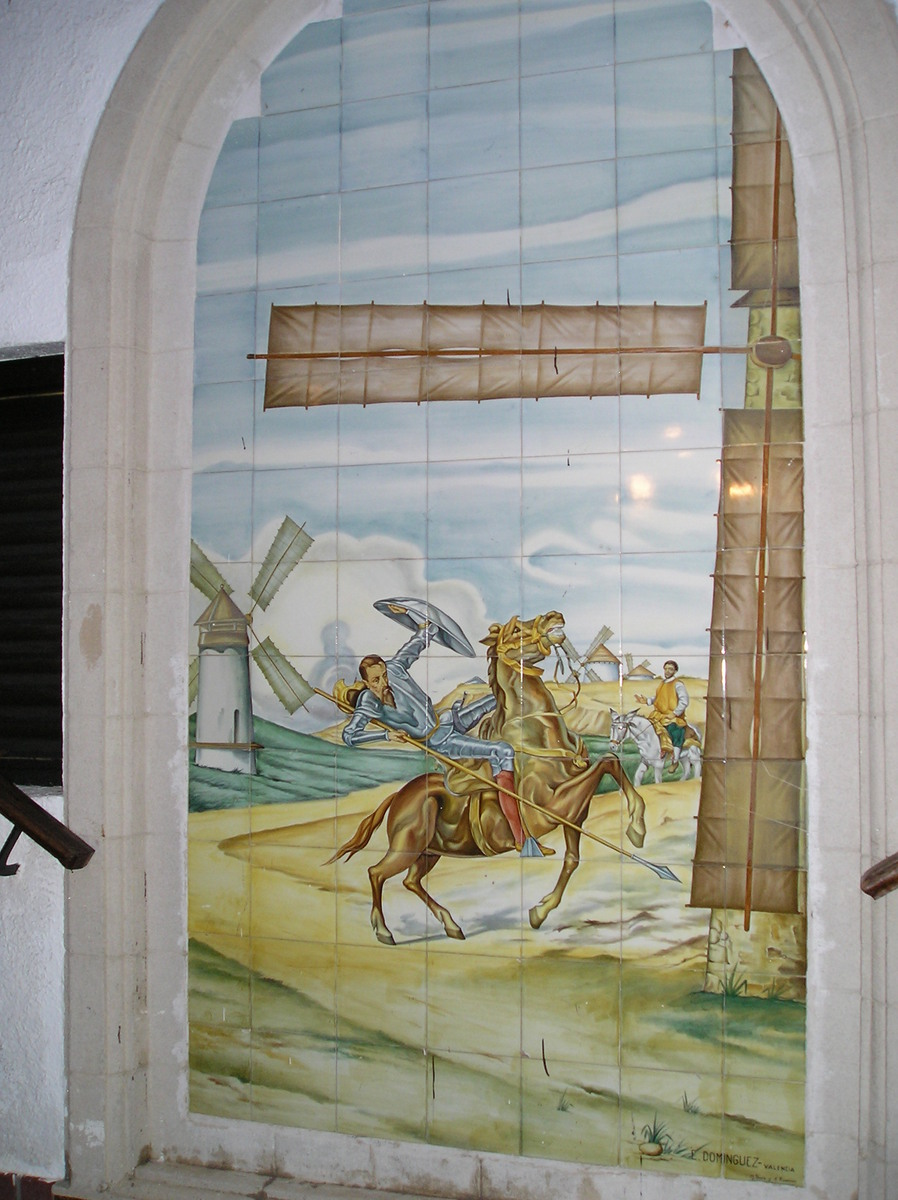
Tiled decoration of Don Quixote and La Mancha.

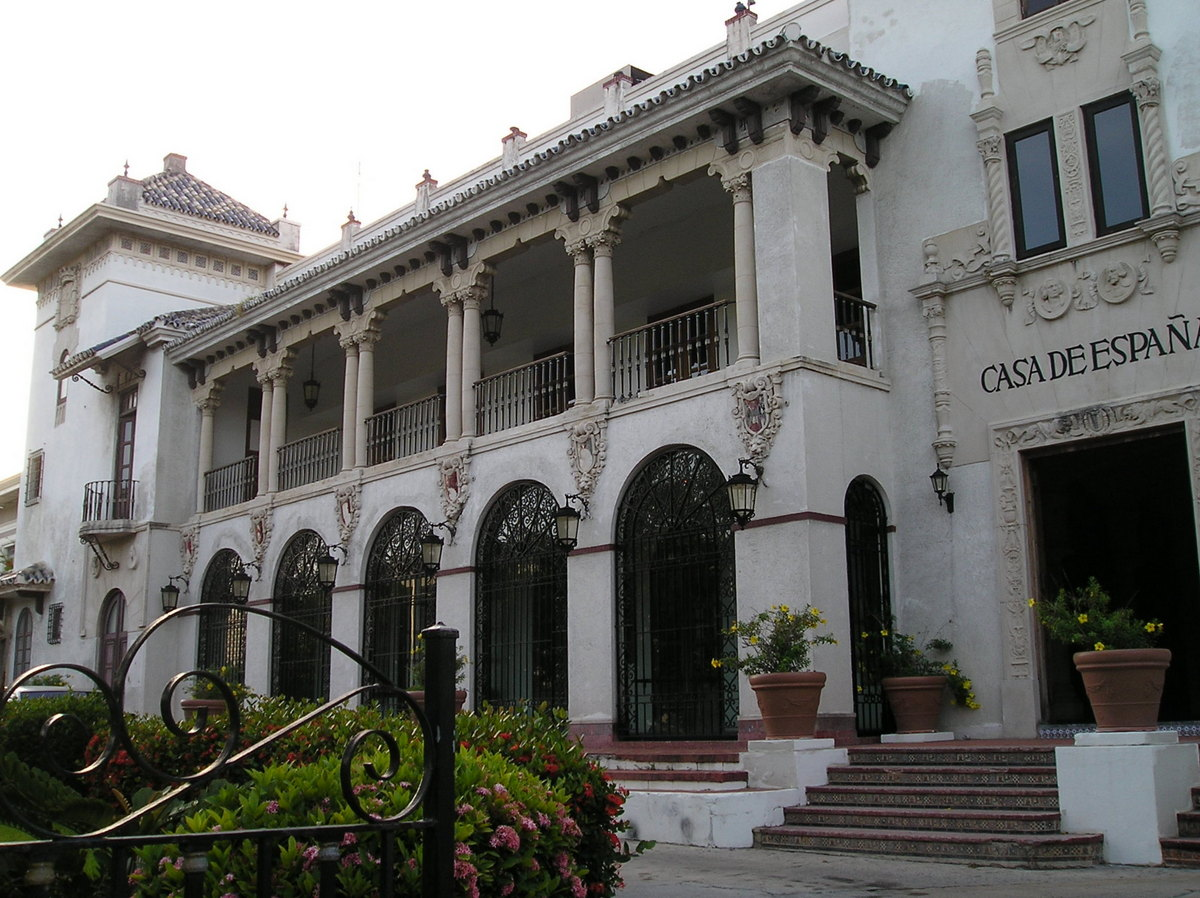
Exterior

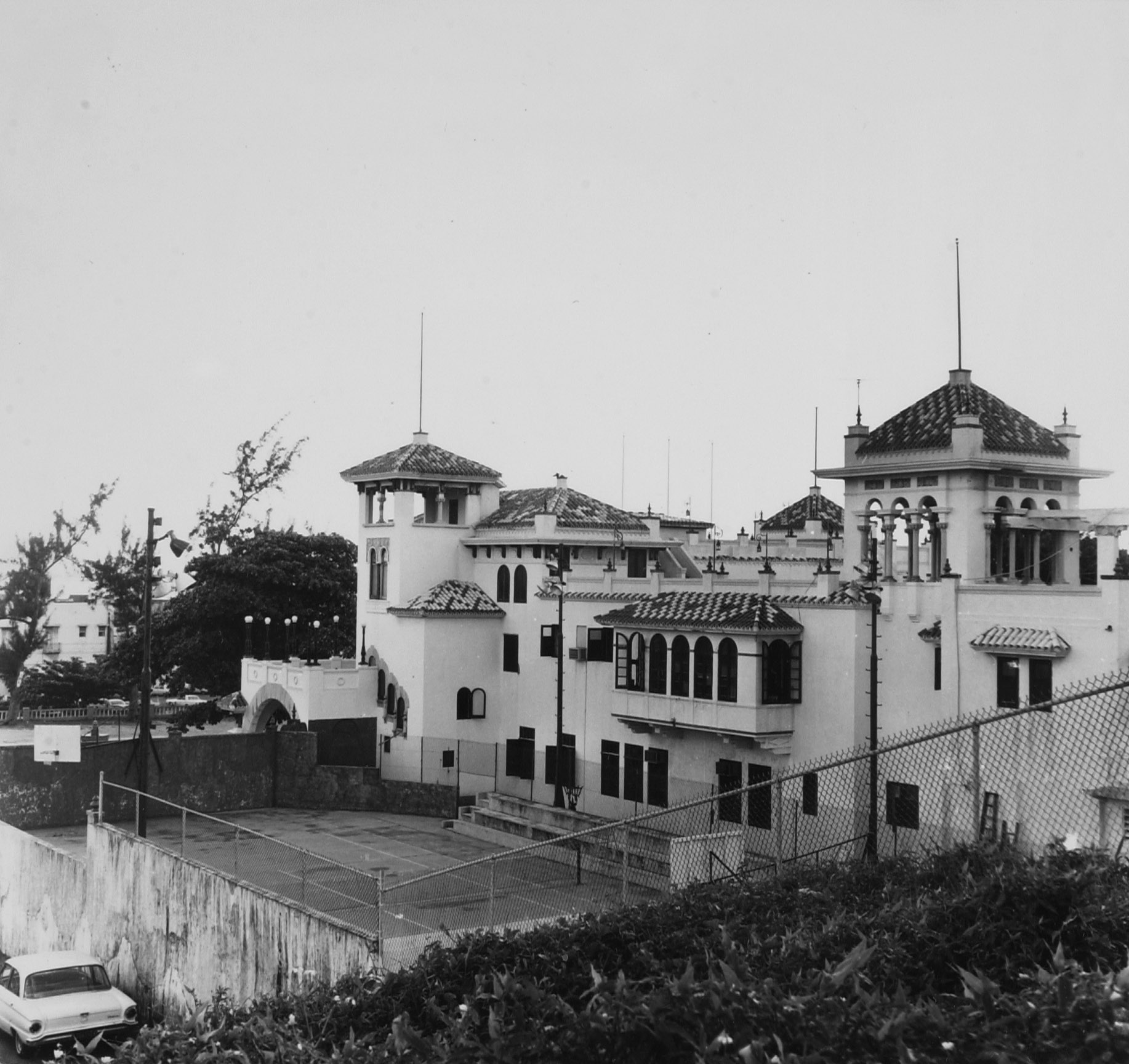
Rear view taken in 1964.

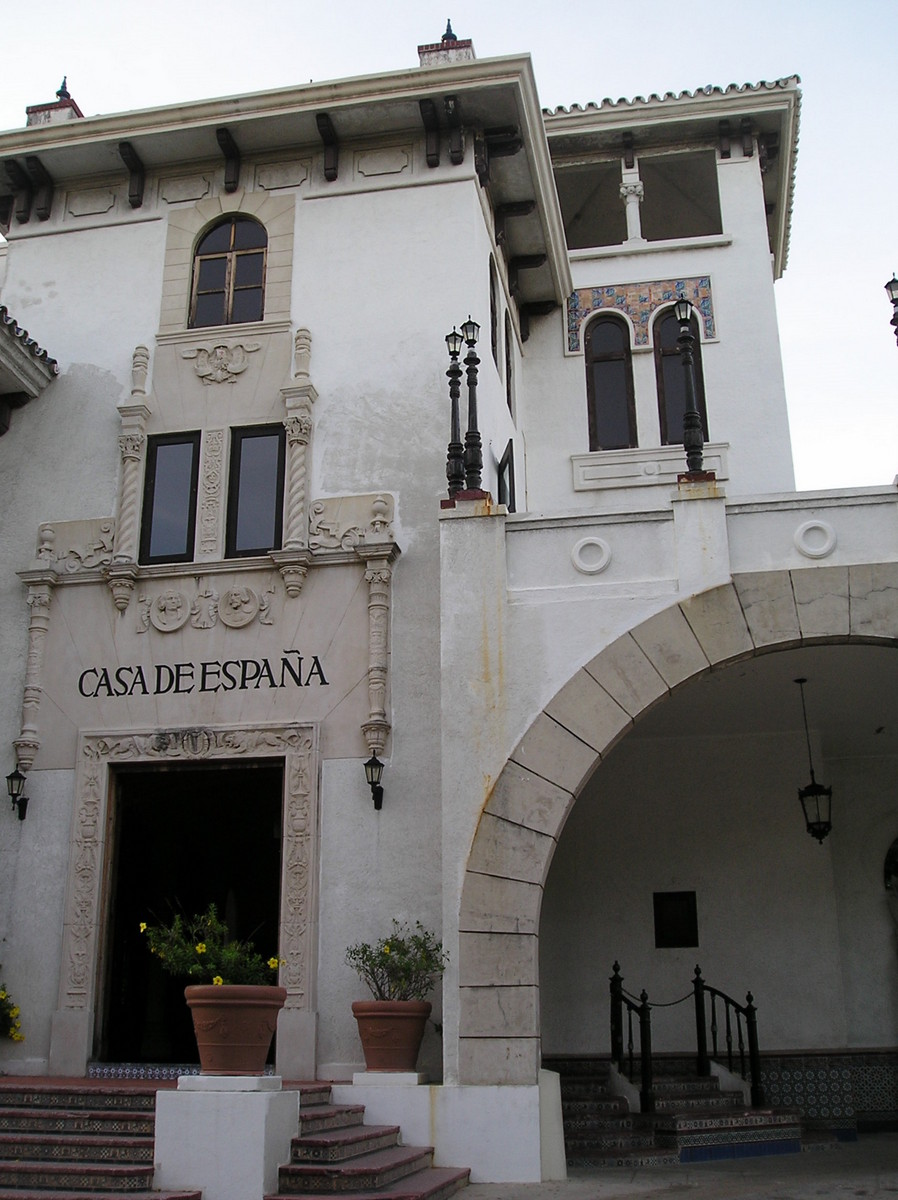
Entrance

== See also ==
- Centro Español de Ponce
