= House at 659 La Paz Street =

Historic house in San Juan, Puerto Rico

- U.S. National Register of Historic Places
- Puerto Rico Historic Sites and Zones
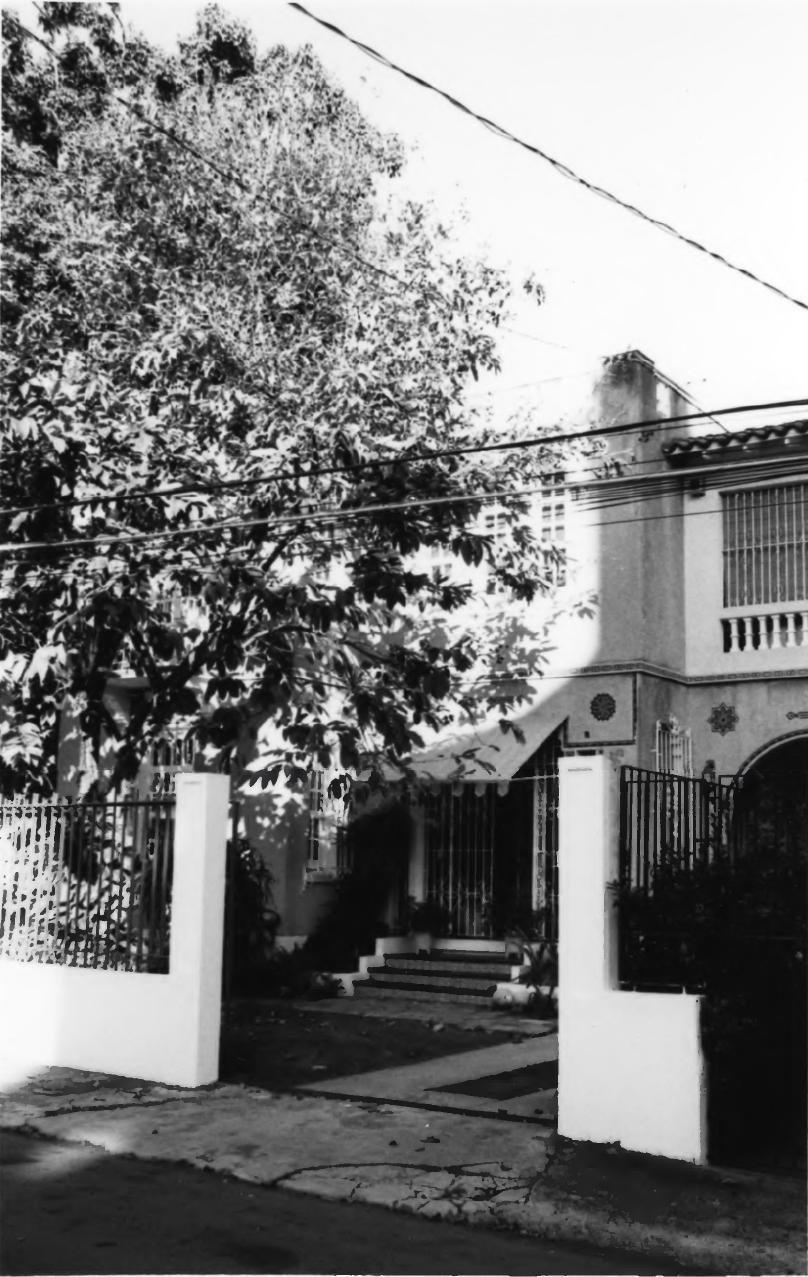
- The house in 1991.

- Location within Puerto Rico
- Location: 659 La Paz Street San Juan, Puerto Rico
- Coordinates: 18°27′10″N 66°04′58″W
- Built: 1928
- Architect: Pedro Adolfo de Castro
- Architectural style: Mission Revival
- NRHP reference No.: 91002007
- RNSZH No.: 2000-(RMSJ)-00-JP-SH

Significant dates
- Added to NRHP: January 30, 1992
- Designated RNSZH: February 3, 2000

659 La Paz is a historic Mission Revival house designed by famed Puerto Rican architect Pedro Adolfo de Castro located in Miramar, a historic residential area of Santurce in the city of San Juan, Puerto Rico. The house was built in 1928, and it was the first of various private residences in Miramar designed by Pedro Adolfo de Castro that, along with structures such as Castillo Serrallés, were instrumental in ushering the Mission Revival architectural style in Puerto Rico.

== See also ==
- House at 659 Concordia Street
- House at 663 La Paz Street
