= Jacinto Lopez Martinez Grammar School =

Historic building in Dorado, Puerto Rico

- U.S. National Register of Historic Places
- Puerto Rico Historic Sites and Zones
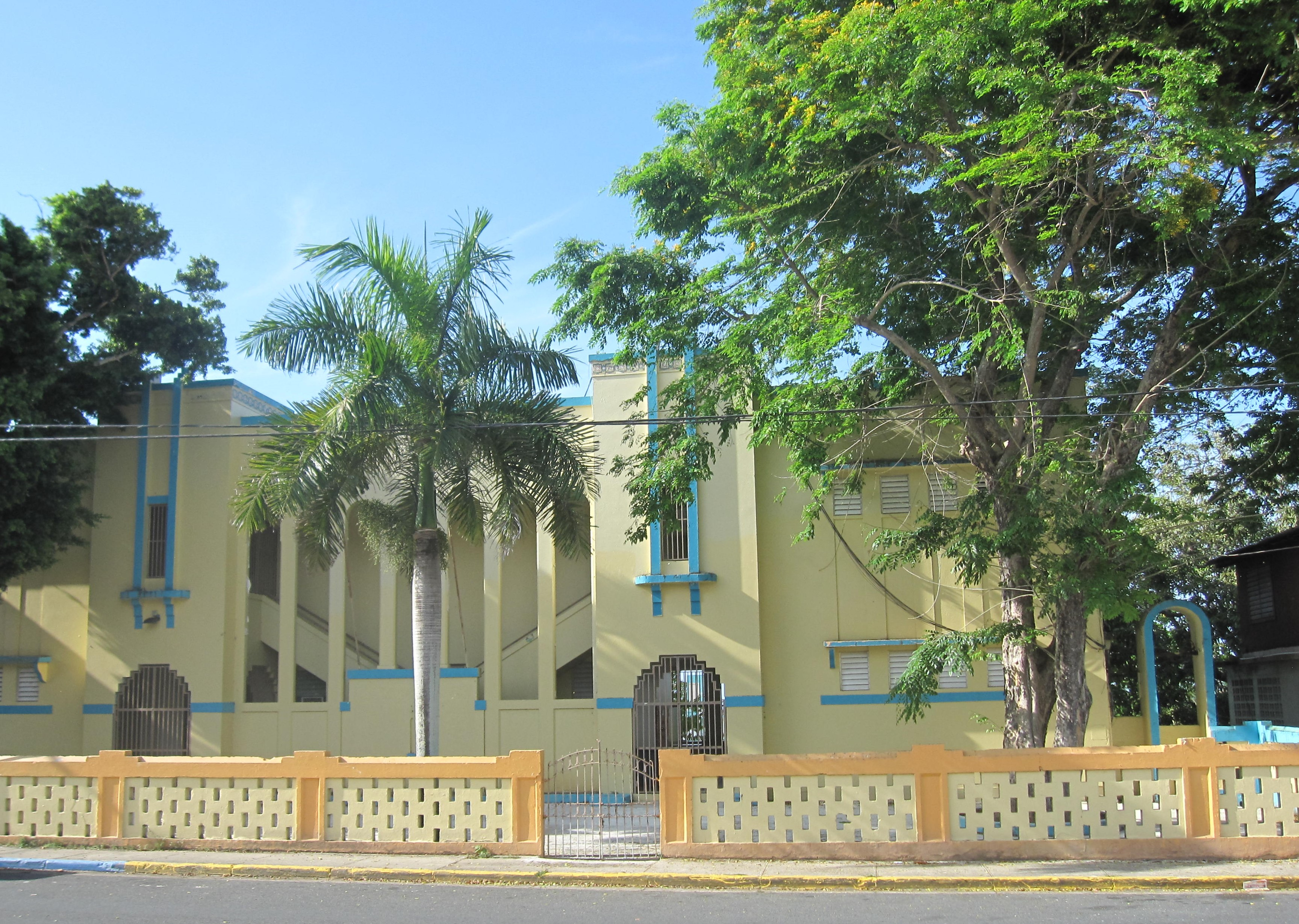
- Jacinto Lopez Martinez Grammar School, May 2019

- Location within Puerto Rico Location within the Caribbean
- Location: Calle Norte and Calle San Quintin, Dorado, Puerto Rico
- Coordinates: 18°27′42″N 66°15′43″W
- Area: less than one acre
- Built: 1923-25
- Architect: Pedro Adolfo de Castro
- Architectural style: Mission/Spanish Revival
- MPS: Early Twentieth Century Schools in Puerto Rico TR
- NRHP reference No.: 88001846
- RNSZH No.: 2000-(RMSJ)-00-JP-SH
- Added to NRHP: October 11, 1988

Jacinto Lopez Martinez Grammar School, also known as Escuela Jacinto Lopez Martinez, in Dorado, Puerto Rico, is a school built in 1923-25 which was designed by architect Pedro Adolfo de Castro.

It is a two-story U-shaped building.

Its National Register of Historic Places (NRHP) nomination describes it as "truly, on the outside, a rich and monumental symbol of the new emphasis given to the education of the Puerto Rican youth in the 1920s and 1930s." Its size, location on the town's main plaza, and architectural detailing "were undoubtedly meant to emphasize the differences between the new system (American) and its ideals in terms of educational goals, and the old, Spanish, ways."
