= Edificio Victory Garden =

Historic building in Santurce, Puerto Rico

- U.S. National Register of Historic Places
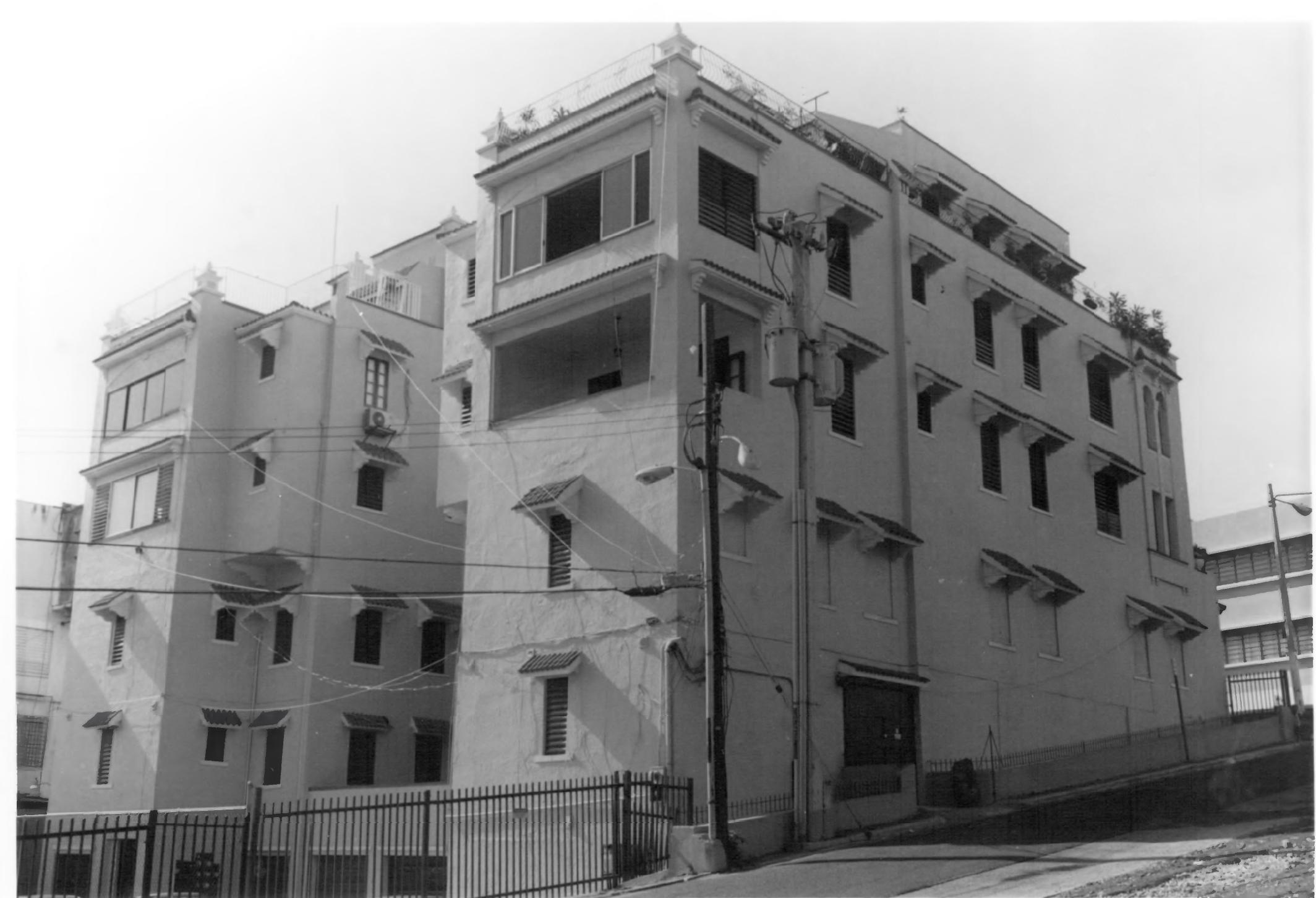

- Location within Puerto Rico
- Location: 1001 Ponce de Leon Ave., corner of Elisa Colberg St., San Juan, Puerto Rico
- Coordinates: 18°27′13″N 66°04′43″W
- Built: 1936
- Architect: Pedro De Castro
- Architectural style: Mission/Spanish Revival
- NRHP reference No.: 04001149
- Added to NRHP: October 13, 2004

Edificio Victory Garden is a four-story apartment house that faces on Ponce de Leon Avenue and Elisa Colberg Street in the Miramar district of Santurce, Puerto Rico. It was deemed notable as "one of Puerto Rico's finest examples of Spanish Revival apartment houses from the early 20th century."

The building was designed by Pedro Adolfo de Castro y Besosa (January 5, 1895 – October 1936), the first United States university-trained Puerto Rican architect. He designed 33 or more apartment houses during 1929–1936. Rafael Carmoega emerged to higher prominence only after de Castro's early death, at age 41.

Although it appears massive, the building's footprint only uses up 30 percent of the lot's area. It is U-shaped with a courtyard not visible from the corner of the streets.
