= Pedro Adolfo de Castro =

Puerto Rican architect (1895–1936)

Pedro Adolfo de Castro Besosa
- Born: 5 January 1895; New York City, United States
- Died: 18 October 1936; San Juan, Puerto Rico
- Education: Syracuse University
- Known for: Architect
- Notable work: Puerto Rico Capitol, Castillo Serrallés, Casa de España, Residencia Jacobo Cabassa (Ponce), Escuela Central de Santurce, Centro de Recreo en Santiago de los Caballeros (D.R.)
- Spouse: Altagracia Gayá Ballesteros
- Children: Pedro A. de Castro Gayá
- Patrons: Government of Puerto Rico

Pedro Adolfo de Castro (1895–1936) was a twentieth-century architect from San Juan, Puerto Rico.

== Early years ==
He was born Pedro Adolfo de Castro Besosa in January 1895, in Brooklyn, New York, to Pedro De Castro (1867 - 1928; from Ceiba, Puerto Rico) and Manuela Mima Besosa (1872 - 1963; from Ponce, Puerto Rico). His family moved back to Puerto Rico when he was five years old.

== Schooling ==
At the age of 19, in 1914, he traveled to New York where he attended school at the Syracuse University, graduating in 1918 with a degree in architecture. He was the first Puerto Rican to graduate from a U.S. school of architecture.

== Career ==
Returning to Puerto Rico in 1918, De Castro Besosa started working at the Puerto Rico Department of the Interior in San Juan, under the direction of Puerto Rico's state architect Adrian Finlayson. During his two-year stay with the government of Puerto Rico (1919-1921), he designed the Puerto Rico Capitol building and the Escuela Central de Santurce building. From his insular government job, Besosa moved to the private sector working for Antonín Nechodoma. There, he designed not only buildings but also lamps, mosaics, furniture, and other products. His private practice was marked by his own interpretation of Spanish architecture to define a purely local Puerto Rican architecture.

== Works ==
De Castro Besosa was the architect most involved in the development of the architecture of the Condado section of San Juan, and his works can be seen throughout the Condado area. He also designed residential estates such as Castillo Serrallés (1926) and Residencia Jacobo Cabassa (1934), both in Ponce. During the years between 1918 and 1936, De Castro Besosa designed over 160 residential projects, 35 apartment buildings, 16 theaters, plus several commercial buildings and civic clubs. He also worked extensively in the Dominican Republic, where he designed and built residential projects as well as the Centro de Recreo en Santiago de los Caballeros (the Santiago de los Caballeros Recreational Center).

Several of his works are listed on the U.S. National Register of Historic Places.

Works include:

- Casa de España, Ponce de Leon Ave., San Juan, Puerto Rico (de Castro, Pedro), NRHP-listed
- Castillo Serrallés, Cerro El Vigia, Ponce, Puerto Rico (de Castro, Pedro Adolfo), NRHP-listed
- Edificio Victory Garden, 1001 Ponce de Leon Ave., corner of Elisa Colberg St., San Juan, Puerto Rico (De Castro, Pedro), NRHP-listed
- House at 659 La Paz Street, 659 La Paz St., Miramar, Puerto Rico (De Castro, Pedro), NRHP-listed
- House at 663 La Paz Street, 663 La Paz St., Miramar, Puerto Rico (De Castro, Pedro A.), NRHP-listed
- Jacinto Lopez Martinez Grammar School, Calle Norte and Calle San Quintin, Dorado, Puerto Rico (de Castro, Pedro Adolfo), NRHP-listed
- Casa Villa Caparra, Carretera PR-19 intersección PR-2 No. 251, Guaynabo, Puerto Rico (de Castro, Pedro Adolfo), NRHP-listed

== Death ==
De Castro Besosa died when his small airplane crashed on 18 October 1936. He was 41 years old.

== Legacy ==
Castillo Serrallés, designed by De Castro y Besosa, is listed in the National Register of Historic Places. One of De Castro Besosa's four children, Pedro A. de Castro Gayá (b. 1919), also became a notable architect in Puerto Rico, designing, among others, the Ponce YMCA Building.

== See also ==
- Alfredo Wiechers Pieretti
- Francisco Porrata-Doria
