= Christoffelpark =

Protected area in Curaçao

Coordinates: 12.3333°N 69.1167°W

- IUCN category II (national park)
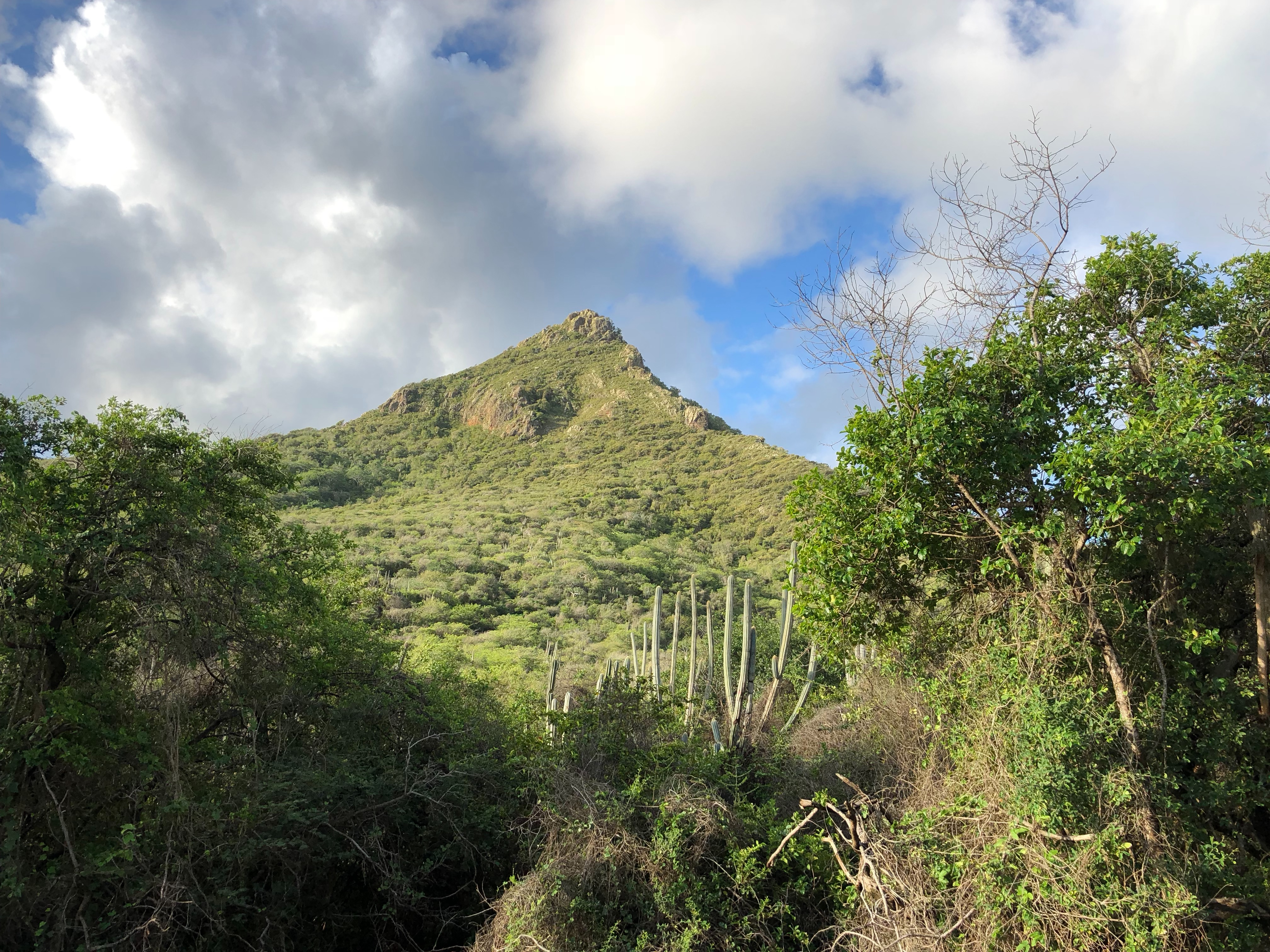
- Christoffel Mountain

- Location within Curaçao
- Location: Curaçao
- Nearest city: Willemstad
- Area: 10.4 km^{2} (4.0 sq mi)
- Established: 1978
- Governing body: CARMABI
- Website: christoffelpark.org

Christoffelpark is a national park, protected nature area and tourist attraction at the north-western end of the island of Curaçao surrounding Christoffelberg (Mt Christoffel).

Notable for its flora, fauna, culture and history, the park includes three former plantations, Plantage Savonet, Plantage Zorgvlied and Plantage Zevenbergen, a mine complex, Newton, and the island's highest point, Christoffelberg (1,239 feet (378 m)). The park covers 1,860 hectares of which 1,040 hectares are nature reserve, and has been part of Curaçao's national park system since 1978. It forms part of the North-east Curaçao parks and coast Important Bird Area.

As of 2001 the park is run by the Carmabi Foundation (Caribbean Research and Management of Biodiversity Foundation) and can be explored by visitors by car, bike, horse or on foot.

== History ==
Plantation Savonet in Christoffelpark is one of the earliest plantations to be founded on Curaçao. As of 2011 the irrigation system is still reasonably intact. Attempts were made to cultivate aloe, indigofera, sorghum, corn, cotton, and beans. Cows, sheep, goats and poultry were also farmed on the plantation.

The plantation houses of Savonet and Zorgvlied (situated at the mountain side of the park) were built on the island in the eighteenth century. Of Zorgvlied only ruins remain. About 100 metres (330 ft) west of Zorgvlied ruins is the house of the 'bomba', the slave in charge of other slaves, and a 'slave-pole'.

Roads in the park were sealed in 2004.

== Flora and fauna ==
Chistoffelpark has more biodiversity than elsewhere on the island. Flora present in the park includes three pillar cacti species (datu, kadushi, and kadushi di pushi), divi-divi trees and exotic flowers. Cacti in the park reach up to ten feet high, and several extremely rare orchids, such as the lady of the night and Humboldt's schomburgkia, can be found blooming on them. Plant species occurring only in Christoffelpark include Myrcia curassavica, endemic to Curaçao, and Maytenus versluysii, endemic to Curaçao and Bonaire.

Fauna notable in the park includes mammals like the white-tailed deer, the cottontail, and several species of bats, birds like the rare white-tailed hawk, an endemic subspecies of barn owl (Tyto alba bargei), hummingbirds like the common emerald and the ruby topaz (Chrysolampis mosquitus), and the endemic yellow oriole. Reptiles and insects are also well represented.

== Tourism ==
Christoffelpark is open to visitors Monday to Sunday from 6am to 3pm, with no admittance after 1.30 pm. Visitors are not allowed to start climbing Mount Cristoffel after 10am.

There are eight hiking trails in the park, of which the Christoffel Mountain climb is the most challenging. Visitors are advised to attempt this climb early in the morning. There are four sealed roads through the park. Organised tours include a deer-spotting sunset tour, a pick-up safari, and the "Savonet history" tour.

The Savonet Museum is located in the plantation house near the entrance to Christoffelpark, and recounts the history of the Savonet plantation and its owners and slaves.
