= Toro Ferrer =

Former architectural firm in Puerto Rico

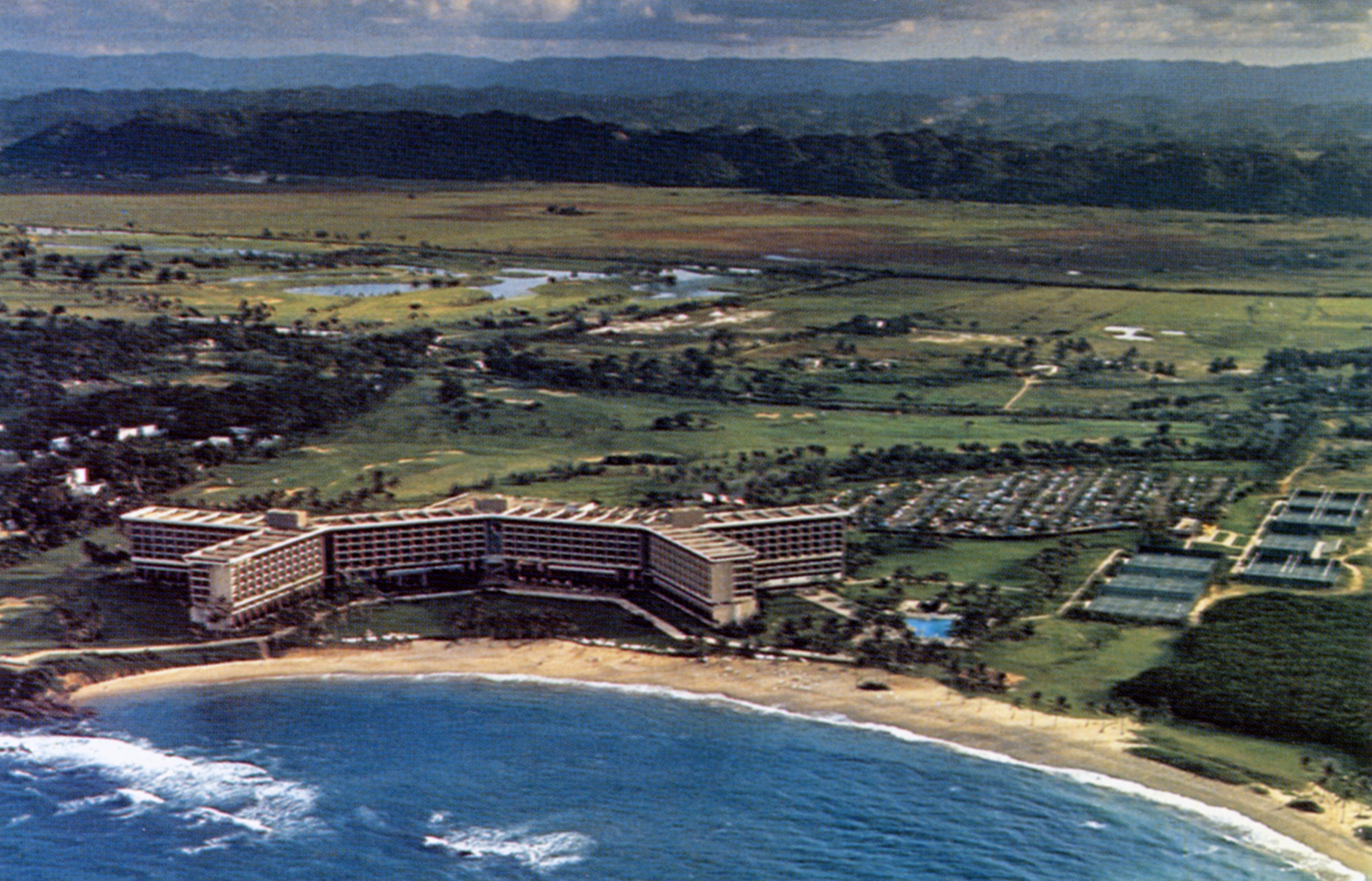
A period view of the former Cerromar Beach Hotel, completed in 1972 and demolished in 2022

Toro—Ferrer was an architectural firm based in San Juan, Puerto Rico. Founded in 1945 and known until 1952 as Toro, Ferrer y Torregrosa, the firm was one of the principal exponents of tropical modernism in Puerto Rico. The firm, led by architects Osvaldo Toro and Miguel Ferrer, designed some of Puerto Rico's most significant modern landmarks. It was dissolved after their dual retirement in 1984.

== History ==
Osvaldo Toro and Miguel Ferrer met in 1938 as employees of the Puerto Rico Reconstruction Administration (PRRA). In their official roles Toro and Ferrer became disillusioned with the official eclectic approach to architecture and in 1945 they and Luis Torregrosa, a civil engineer, left to form a private sector firm known as Toro, Ferrer y Torregrosa. They soon won their first important commission, the Caribe Hilton Hotel (1949). The architect had been chosen in a competition in which Puerto Rican and mainland architects participated. The mainland architects offered entries designed in the Spanish Colonial Revival style, promoting a romantic and idyllic view of the island, while the Puerto Ricans offered modernist projects. For the interiors of the hotel, the firm collaborated with Warner—Leeds of New York City. The senior partner of that firm, Charles H. Warner Jr., had been a Columbia classmate of Toro's. The hotel was covered widely in the professional architectural press and was awarded a silver medal at the eighth Pan-American Congress of Architects in 1950. Henry-Russell Hitchcock found the hotel to be "the most successful of the resort hotels in Latin America" and that their work generally had a "special quality in [its] planning which effectively combines North American and Latin American ideas."

In 1952 Torregrosa withdrew from the firm, which continued as Toro—Ferrer. Their next important work was the Supreme Court Building (1955, NRHP-listed), in which they expanded on their ideas and again collaborated with Warner. Other works in San Juan included the House and Senate annexes to the Capitol of Puerto Rico (1955) and the Intendente Ramirez Building of the Puerto Rico Department of Treasury (1969) in San Juan Antiguo, the La Concha Resort (1958) in Santurce and the General Studies Building (1969) of the University of Puerto Rico at Río Piedras. Elsewhere in Puerto Rico they designed the Luis Muñoz Marín International Airport (1955) and Kodak Building (1972) in Carolina and the Cerromar Beach Hotel (1972, demolished 2022) near Dorado. Abroad they designed the former Hilton Curaçao (1967) in Willemstad, Curaçao, and the Barceló Aruba (1975) in Palm Beach, Aruba. They were also associate architects for the San Juan Marriott (1963) in Santurce and the headquarters of the Banco Popular de Puerto Rico (1966) in Hato Rey, for which the principal architects were Warner Burns Toan Lunde and Kahn & Jacobs, respectively.

The partnership of Toro and Ferrer survived until 1984. In 1993 a new firm, Toro Ferrer Arquitectos, was formed by José Javier Toro, son of Osvaldo Toro, and Gonzalo Miguel Ferrer, nephew of Miguel Ferrer. This firm has been incorrectly seen as a formal continuation of the original firm. Since 2010 Toro has worked under the name Toro Arquitectos.

== Partner biographies ==
Osvaldo Luis Toro (November 27, 1914 — 1995) was born in Ponce. He studied architecture at Columbia University and graduated in 1937 with a BArch. For a year he worked for architect Ernest Flagg, then near the end of his career, before going to work for the PRRA as a junior architect in 1938. With the exception of the year 1942–43, when he was associated with Rafael Carmoega, he worked for government agencies until 1945.

Toro was married in 1939 and had six children, including two sons and four daughters. He died in 1996.

Miguel Ferrer (September 12, 1915 — 2004) was born in San Juan. His architectural education was at Cornell University, from which he graduated in 1938 with a BArch. He then returned to Puerto Rico to join the PRRA, where he met Toro. He died in 2004.

== Honors and legacy ==
In 1967 both Toro and Ferrer were elected Fellows of the American Institute of Architects. In 1986 they were awarded the Henry Klumb Award by the Colegio de Arquitectos de Puerto Rico, or College of Architects of Puerto Rico.

The Architecture and Construction Archives at the University of Puerto Rico (AACUPR) conserves the Toro y Ferrer Collection (1938–1984). Approximately 98 cubic feet in size, the collection contains architectural drawings, photographs, presentation boards, project albums, and textual documents. The Architectural Drawing Series holds 267 projects organized chronologically. The collection was donated by Toro and Ferrer in 1990.

== Gallery ==
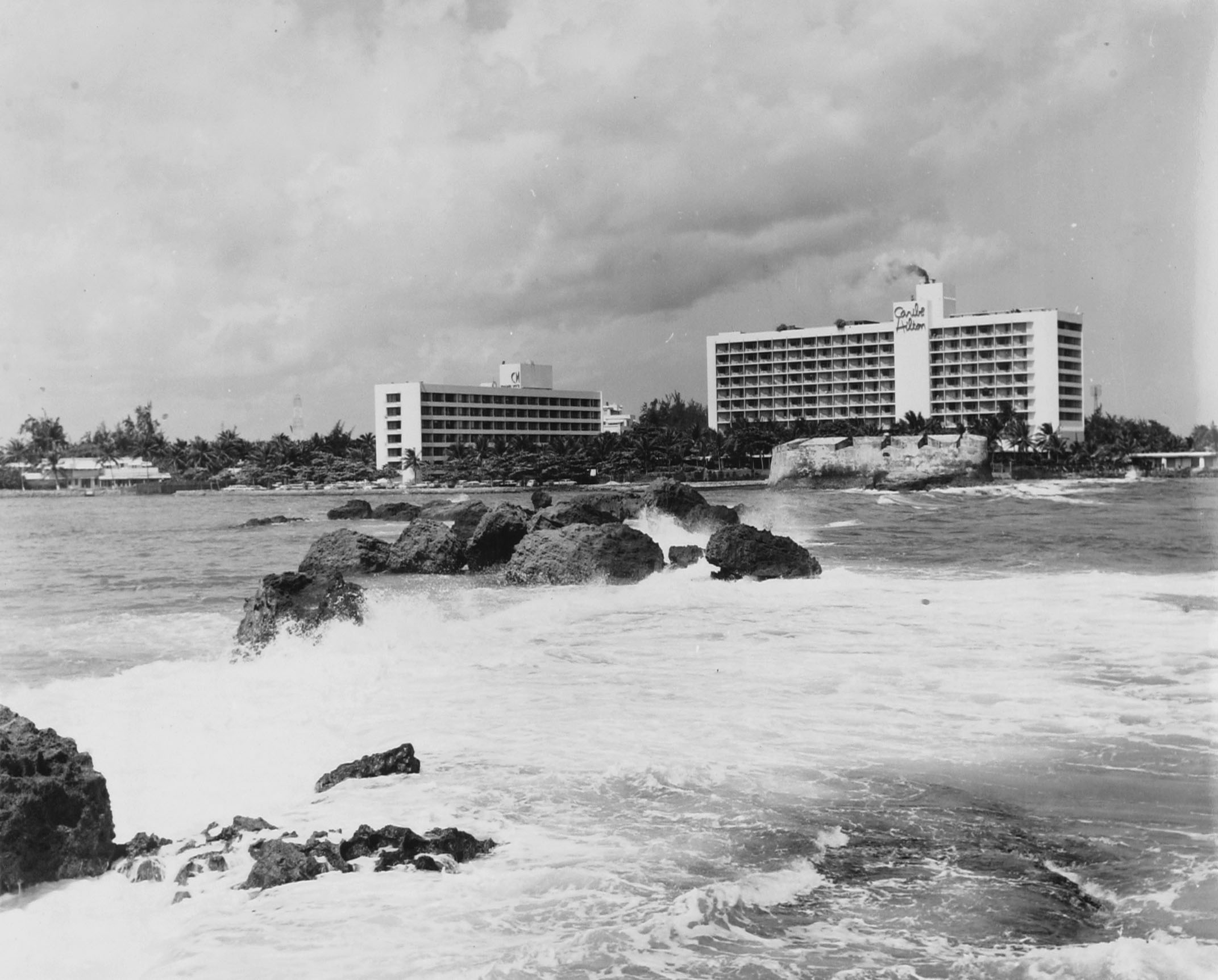
A period view of the Caribe Hilton Hotel, completed in 1949, as seen from Condado

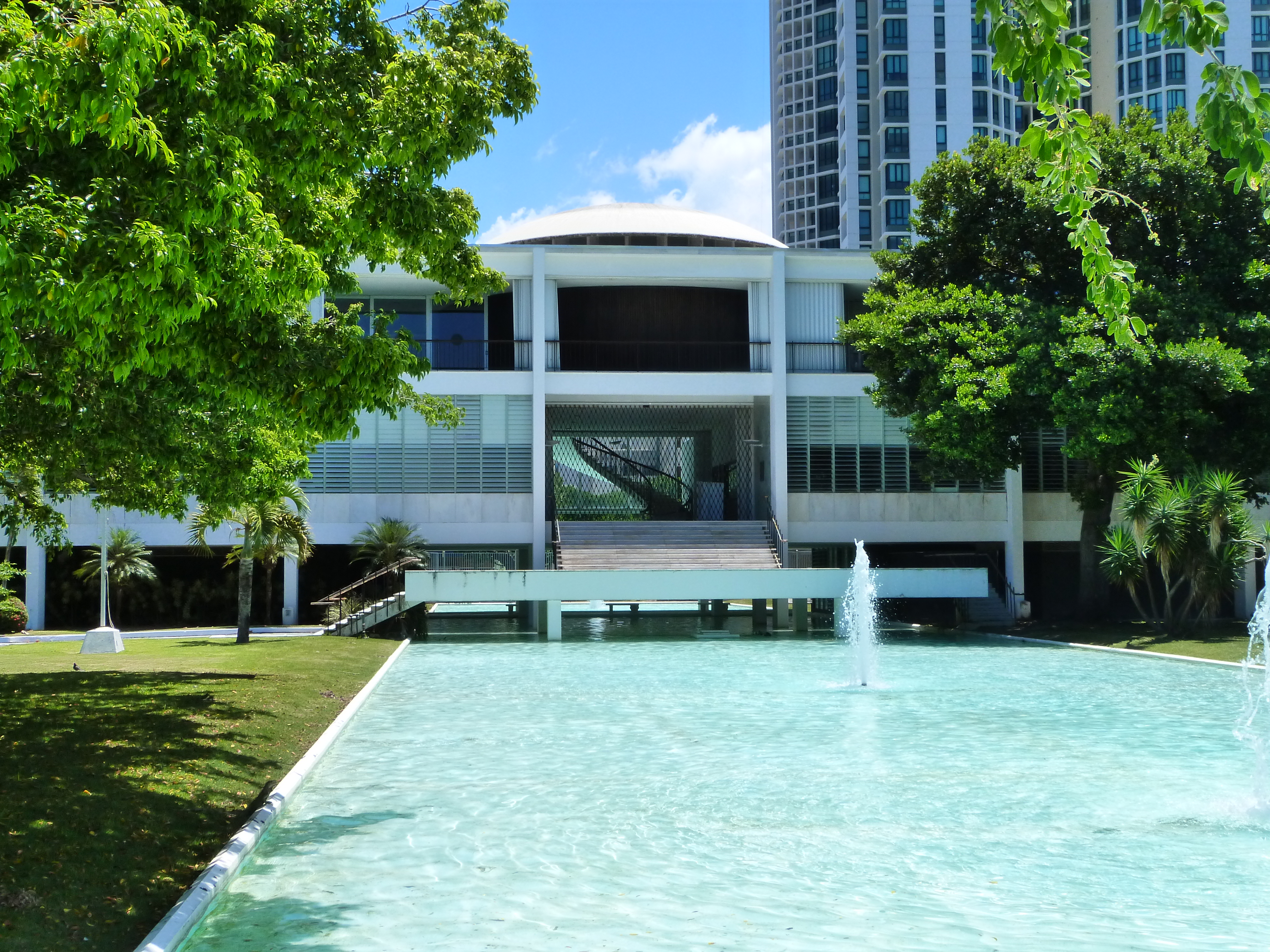
The Supreme Court Building, completed in 1955

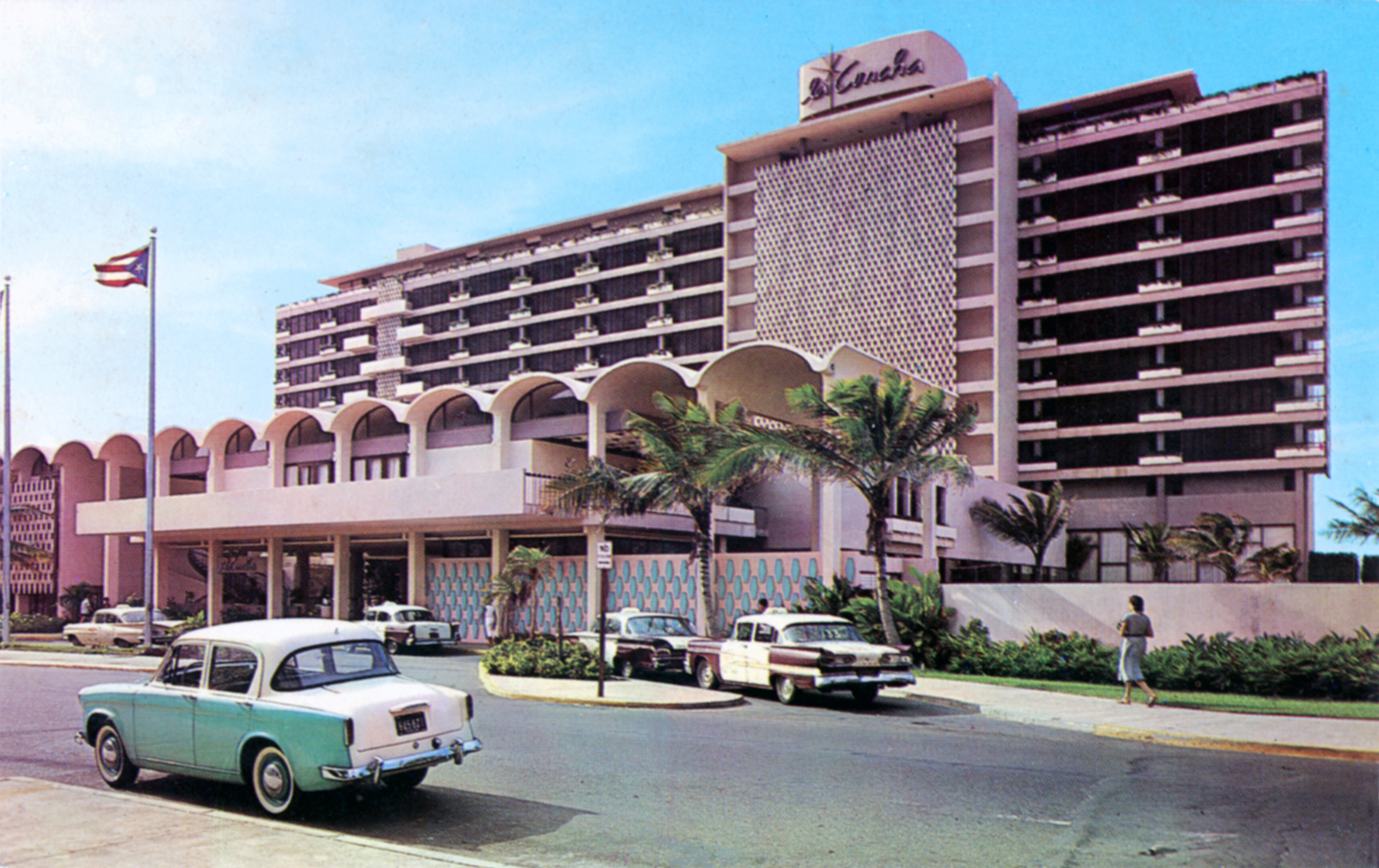
A period view of the La Concha Resort, completed in 1958

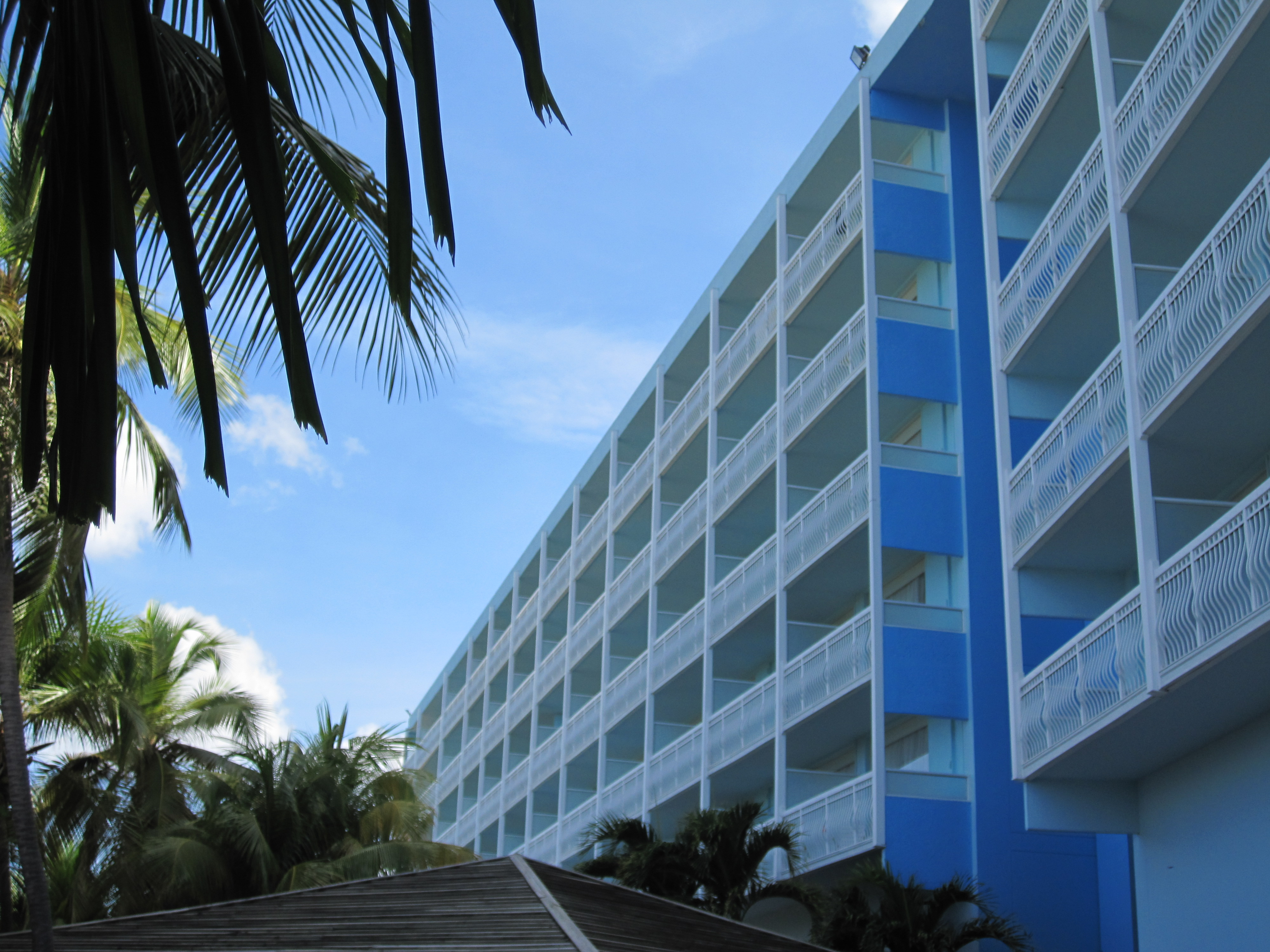
The former Hilton Curaçao, completed in 1967

== See also ==
- List of Puerto Ricans
- Architecture of Puerto Rico
