= Dreams Curaçao Resort =

Resort hotel located in Willemstad, Curaçao

Coordinates: 12.1367°N 68.9681°W

The Dreams Curaçao Resort, Spa & Casino is a large resort hotel located in Willemstad, Curaçao. It opened in 1967 as the Curaçao Hilton,

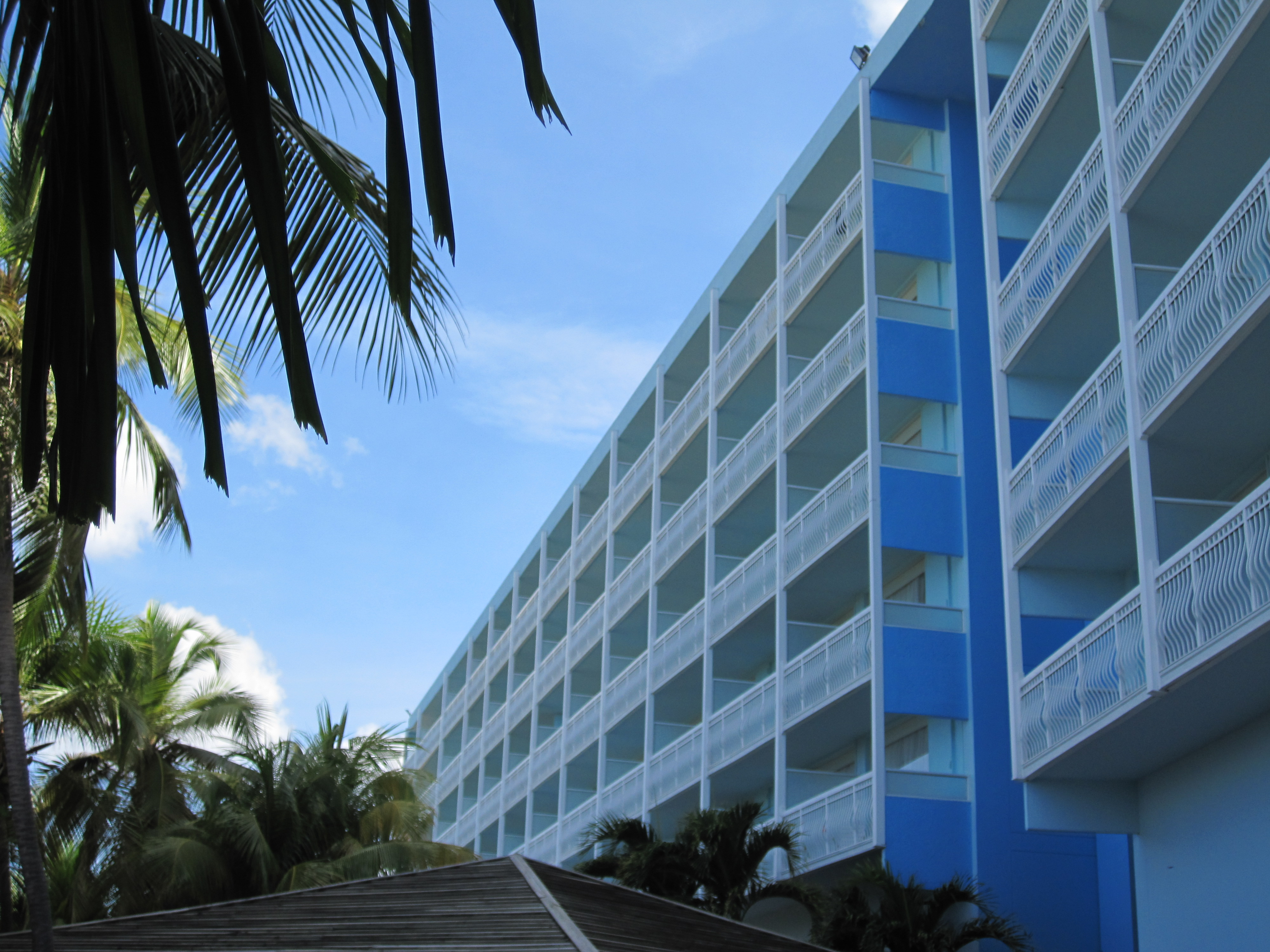
Western facade of the Hilton Curaçao, repainted in blue

== History ==
The hotel's cornerstone was laid by Prince Bernhard in September 1965, and it was opened as the Curaçao Hilton on December 8, 1967, by Governor Nicolaas Debrot and Conrad Hilton. The 200-room hotel was designed by the Puerto Rico architectural firm of Toro Ferrer, in association with Ben Smit, a local Curaçao architect. Toro Ferrer had previously designed the first Hilton Hotel to be constructed outside the continental United States, the Caribe Hilton Hotel in San Juan, Puerto Rico (opened in 1949), while Ben Smit had been involved in the design of the Hotel Curaçao Intercontinental (currently Plaza Hotel Curaçao). The Curaçao Hilton was the third seaside hotel to open in Curaçao, after the Avila Hotel was inaugurated in 1949 and the Hotel Curaçao Intercontinental in 1955.

The original building was a blend of typical Curaçao elements and contemporary architecture. The windows were inspired by the frontage line of houses on the Handelskade in Willemstad, Curaçao, while the main building material was concrete. The remains of the Fort Piscadera, an eighteenth-century fortification built to safeguard the Bay from attacks by English, Spanish and French invading forces, were restored and harmonized in the landscaping of the resort.

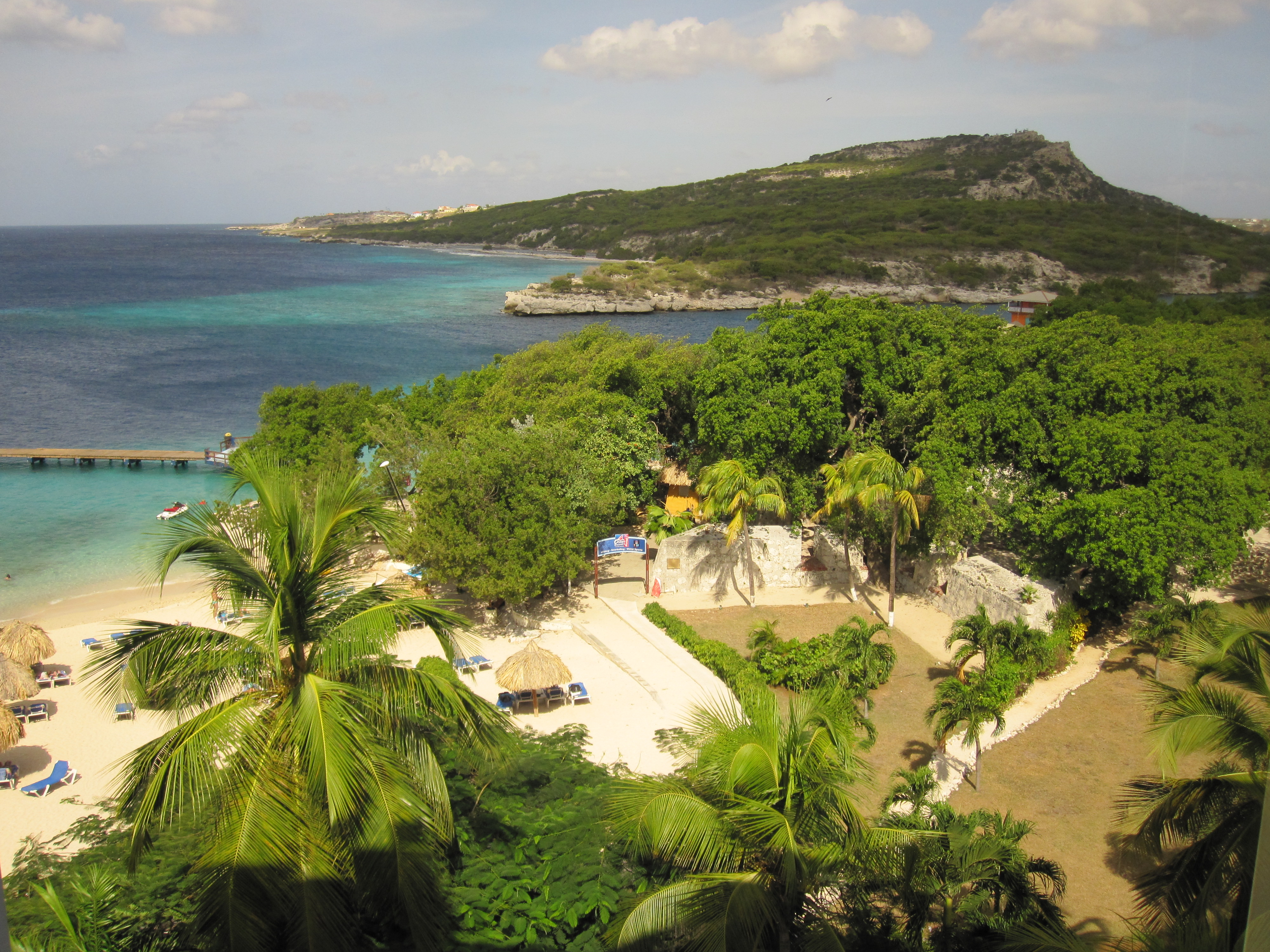
View from glass elevator towards the Piscadera Fort and Bay

The hotel changed ownership in 1983 and was renamed the Curaçao Concorde. In the following years it was consecutively renamed Curaçao Caribbean Resort and Curaçao Casino Resort until being branded Sheraton Curaçao Resort in 1999.

Lionstone Hotels & Resorts took over the hotel and renamed it the Hilton Curaçao in 2003. It was renovated at a cost of $15 million in 2019 and renamed Dreams Curaçao Resort, Spa & Casino in late 2019.

== Description ==
The main hotel complex is located on the shores of Piscadera Bay, but the resort stretches along the Caribbean Sea around the southern coast of the island. Recreational facilities include two private beaches (one at the Bay and the other adjacent to the Curaçao Marriott Beach Resort), three swimming pools, a dive school, two tennis courts, a miniature golf course, a Health Club, a spa and Curaçao Casino. Dinner facilities include Aqua (a buffet restaurant), Cielo (an Italian à la carte restaurant) and the Beach Bar & Grill.

An extensive refurbishment has been carried out that replaced the original grid exterior consisting of arched windows for more open balconies. The interior and exterior were repainted in pastel colors. Construction of an additional south wing was planned for 2008, but cancelled due to a decline in visitor numbers due to the 2008 financial crisis. This wing would have contained 126 to 136 rooms, a new swimming pool and a partially enclosed / partially open air restaurant. It was to be located on the site of the current Health Club, Kidz Paradise and miniature golf course. Funds for the construction of the south wing were eventually redirected to renovation of the aging main building, including a replacement of the two original 1967 glass elevators.
