= Caribbean Research and Management of Biodiversity Foundation =

Research institution in Curaçao

- Formation: 1955
- Purpose: Marine research organisation
- Headquarters: Piscadera Bay, Willemstad, Curaçao
- Coordinates: 12.12217°N 68.96870°W
- Website: Research Station CARMABI

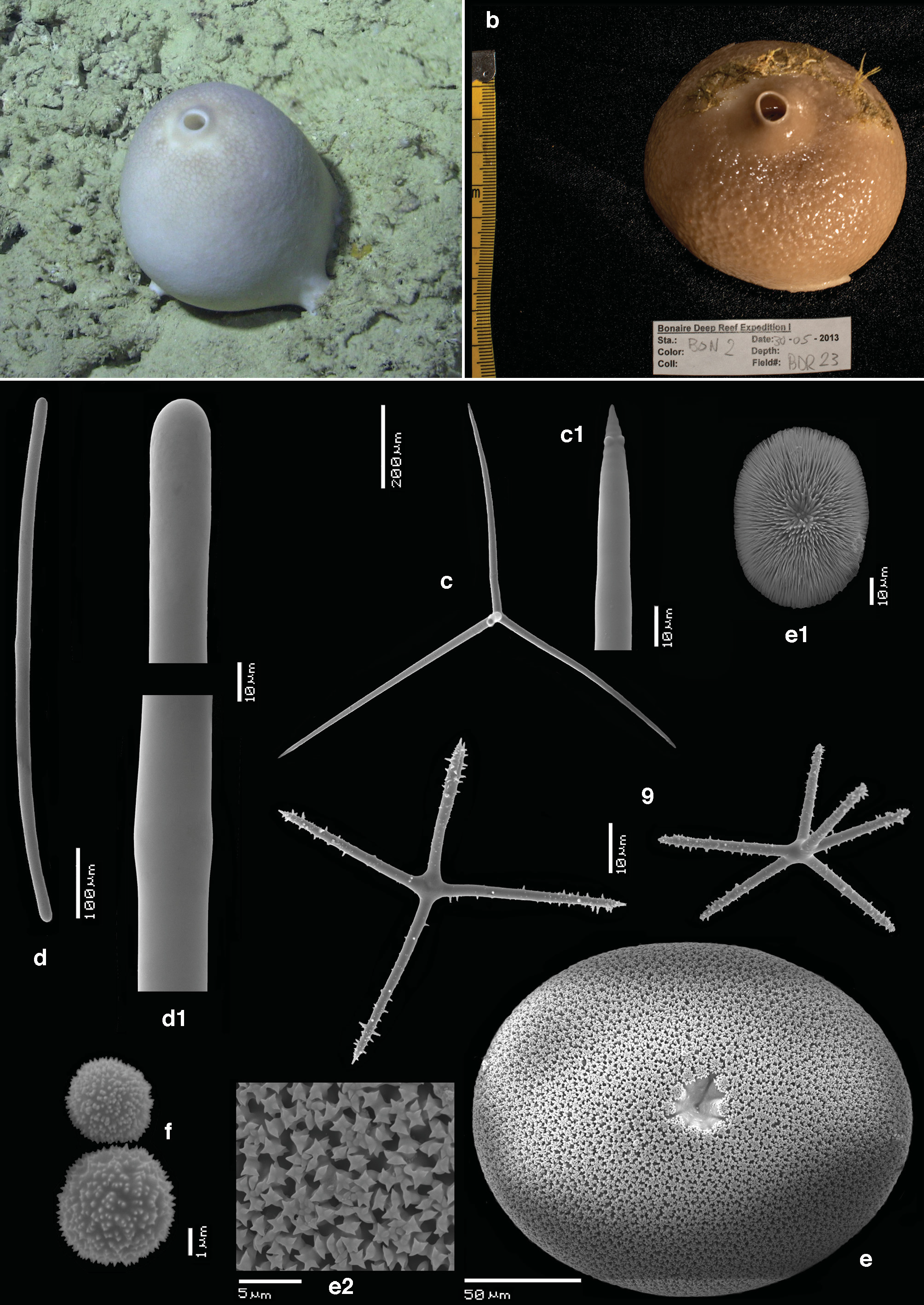
Caminus carmabi, a sponge named after the CARMBAI foundation

Caribbean Research and Management of Biodiversity Foundation (previously The Caribbean Marine Biological Institute; commonly referred to as CARMABI Foundation or just CARMABI) is a research organization in Curaçao, former Netherlands Antilles. It is situated in Piscadera Bay, 25 metres (82 ft) from the Caribbean Sea. Its education and research programs include the ecological aspects of fisheries and coral reef sciences.

== History ==
In 1955, the head of Curaçao's petroleum industry proposed funding for a scientific institution at Piscadera Bay as it was noted to be a perfect location for research; subsequently, plans were drawn to establish the institution. Originally named the Caribbean Marine Biological Institute (CARMABI), the station was founded in 1955 at the bay's open end. Its work centered on research in the field of ecology—fisheries. As the bay front has extensive coral reefs, research in the field of coral reef science was initiated in 1969. Consequent to increased participation in the activities of the institute, the CARMABI facility was enlarged, adding a new building with laboratory facilities on the shore line. Residential dormitories were also constructed to house 30 persons. By 1970, its facility contained wet and dry laboratories, an aquarium, as well as four work rooms.

In association with National Parks Foundation of the Netherlands Antilles (STINAPA), CARMABI has conducted terrestrial and marine projects, CARMABI being associated with research while STINAPA is associated with management. In 1999, CARMABI and STINAPA became a single entity, renamed as the Caribbean Research and Management of Biodiversity Foundation, although continuing to be referred to as CARMABI. CARMABI, the SECORE (SExual COral REproduction) Foundation and the Curaçao Sea-Aquarium jointly carried out a study in Curaçao, which involved developing the techniques needed to regenerate depauperate Acropora palmate in the entire area of the Caribbean. CARMABI Foundation, also associated with the management of the Christoffel Park and the Shete Boka Park, is "the largest field station in the Southern Caribbean". Jacques S. Zaneveld of Old Dominion University was a former director.

In 2013, the Bonaire Deep Reef Expedition discovered 13 new species of sponges off the coast of Bonaire and Klein Curaçao. Of the new species discovered, Caminus carmabi has been named after CARMABI, and Plakinastrella stinapa after STINAPA.

== Bibliography ==
- Benson, Keith Rodney; Rehbock, Philip F. (2002). Oceanographic History: The Pacific and Beyond. University of Washington Press. ISBN 978-0-295-98239-7.
- Caribbean Commission (1955). The Caribbean, Volumes 9–10. University of Texas.
- General Biological Supply House (1958). Turtox News, Volumes 36–38. Macmillan Science Company.
- National Academy of Sciences; National Research Council (1970). Marine Ecological Research for the Central American Interoceanic Canal. Washington, D. C.: National Academies. NAP:16695.
- Soest, R.W.M. van; Meesters, E.H.; Becking, L.E. (2014). "Deep-water sponges (Porifera) from Bonaire and Klein Curaçao, Southern Caribbean" (PDF). Zootaxa. 3878 (5): 401–443. doi:10.11646/zootaxa.3878.5.1.
- Zaneveld, Jacques Simon (1983). Caribbean Fish Life: Index to the Local and Scientific Names of the Marine Fishes and Fishlike Invertebrates of the Caribbean Area (tropical Western Central Atlantic Ocean). Brill Archive. ISBN 90-04-06770-1.
