= SCF Architects =

Firm based in San Juan, Puerto Rico

- Industry: Architecture, Interior Architecture, & Space Planning
- Founded: 1984; 42 years ago
- Founders: Luis Sierra AIA; Segundo Cardona FAIA; Alberto Ferrer AIA
- Area served: Worldwide
- Key people: Segundo Cardona FAIA (Founding Partner); Alberto Ferrer AIA (Founding Partner); Carmen Rita Fortuño AIA (Partner); Clemente González (Partner)
- Website: www.scf-arquitectos.com

SCF Architects, formerly Sierra Cardona Ferrer Arquitectos, is a Puerto Rican architecture, interior architecture and space planning firm.

SCF was established in San Juan, Puerto Rico, in 1984. The firm's name is derived from the surnames of its three founding partners: Luis Sierra AIA, Segundo Cardona FAIA and Alberto Ferrer AIA, all former design professors at the School of Architecture of the University of Puerto Rico. Since its founding, the firm has completed more than 800 design projects in Puerto Rico and abroad. Among the most recent international awards received are the 2017 Public Space Award from the International Union of Architects (UIA), for the Paseo Puerta de Tierra promenade in San Juan, and two awards for the Salvation Army’s Ray & Joan Kroc Community Center in Guayama, Puerto Rico: the 2014 Best Public Building Award from the International Union of Architects (UIA) and the IPC/IAKS (International Association for Sports and Leisure Facilities) Distinction for Accessibility.
