= North-east Curaçao parks and coast Important Bird Area =

Important Bird Area on Curaçao in the Dutch Caribbean

Coordinates: 12°21′08″N 69°06′15″W

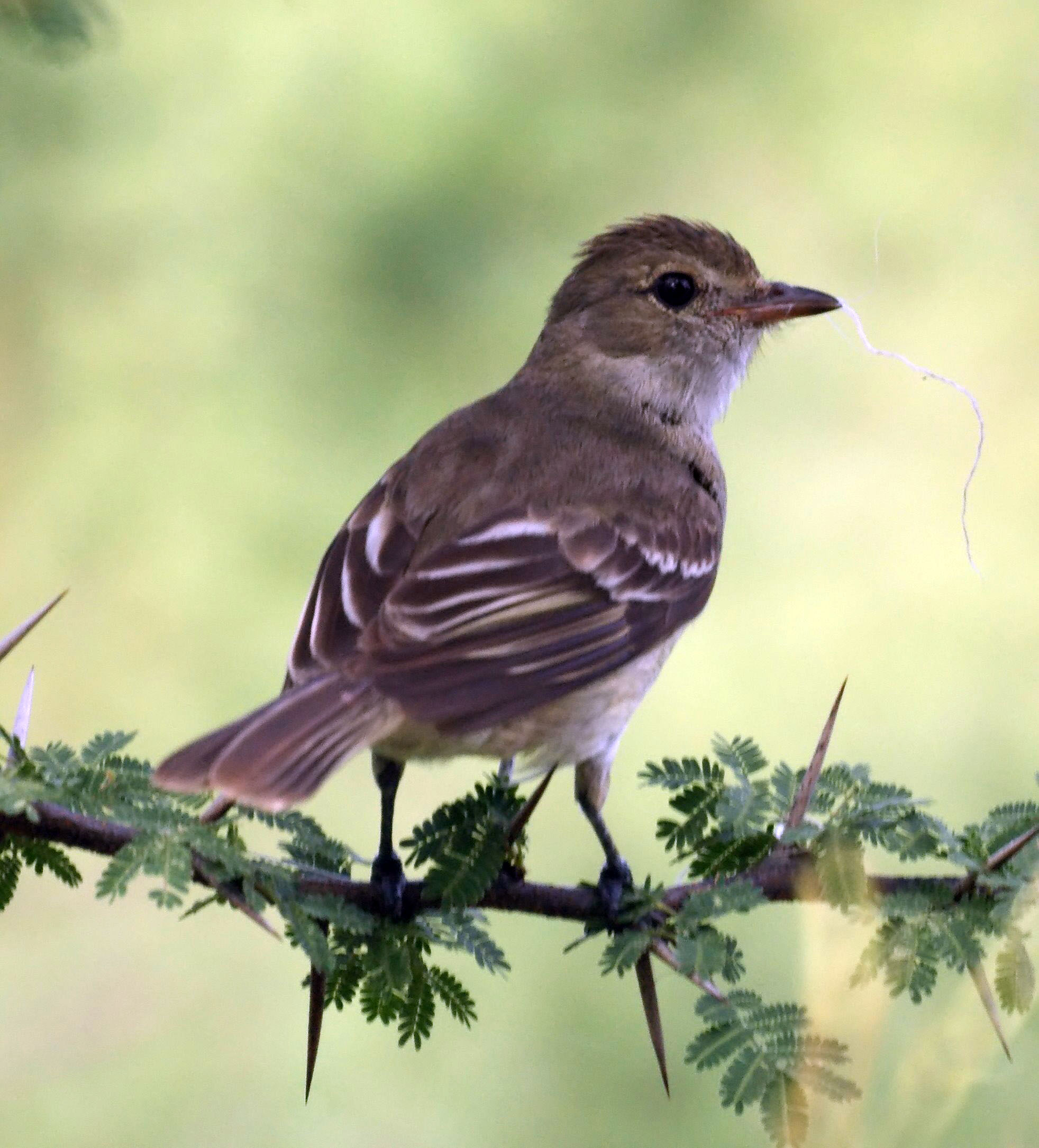
Caribbean elaenias are resident in the IBA

The North-east Curaçao parks and coast Important Bird Area is a 13,554 ha tract of land in Curaçao, a constituent island nation of the Kingdom of the Netherlands in the Dutch Caribbean.

== Description ==
It encompasses much of the north-western end of the island, including the Christoffel and Shete Boka National Parks, as well as a strip of coast from there half-way down the northern side of the island. It has been identified as an Important Bird Area by BirdLife International because it supports populations of bare-eyed pigeons and Caribbean elaenias, as well as a major breeding colony of least terns.
