= Supreme Court Building (Puerto Rico) =

Building in San Juan, Puerto Rico

- U.S. National Register of Historic Places
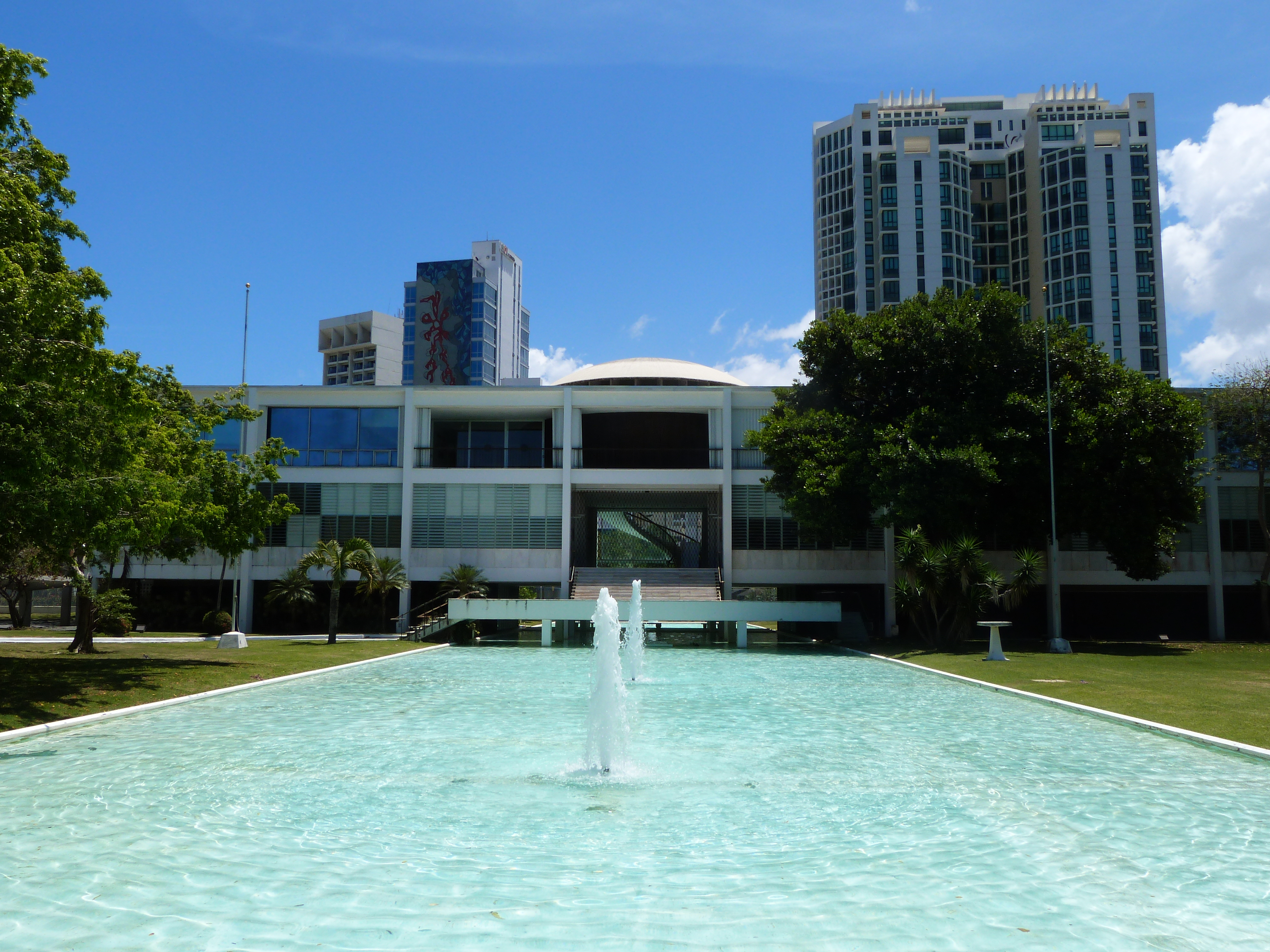
- Main façade (west) of the Supreme Court Building (foreground), 2017
- Interactive map of Supreme Court Building
- Location: Luis Muñoz Rivera Park; San Juan, Puerto Rico
- Coordinates: 18°27′47″N 66°05′18″W
- Area: 4 acres (1.6 ha)
- Built: 1955
- Architect: Osvaldo Toro; Miguel Ferrer
- Architectural style: Modern Movement
- NRHP reference No.: 06000506
- Added to NRHP: June 14, 2006

The Supreme Court Building (Spanish: Edificio del Tribunal Supremo) is the seat of the Supreme Court of Puerto Rico, the highest court of the judicial branch in the U.S. territory, located within the grounds of the Luis Muñoz Rivera Park in the Puerta de Tierra historic district of San Juan, the capital city and municipality. Built by the Toro Ferrer firm in 1955, the Tropical Modern, International Style courthouse is a three-story, rectangular edifice projected over a perpendicular reflecting pool. Situated in the eastern end of San Juan Islet, it is about 1 mile (1.6 km) from the Capitol, seat of the legislative branch, in the center of the Islet near the entrance to the Old San Juan historic quarter, and 2 miles (3.2 km) from the La Fortaleza, seat of the executive branch, in the western end of the Islet in Old San Juan. It was listed on the U.S. National Register of Historic Places in 2006.

The Supreme Court building is home to the Supreme Court of Puerto Rico, the highest court in the archipelago and island, and is the successor to the Real Audiencia Territorial (Royal Territorial Court), a court of appeals with jurisdiction over Puerto Rico first founded by the Spanish Empire in 1832. Its construction marked the newly established commonwealth status of Puerto Rico, which was specified in the Constitution of Puerto Rico in 1952. The building was officially inaugurated in February 1956 with U.S. Supreme Court chief justice Earl Warren as the main speaker.

The courthouse was designed by Puerto Rican architects Osvaldo Toro and Miguel Ferrer with design consultation by Charles H. Warner Jr. and Harold Eliot Leeds. Featuring a Tropical Modern design, the building has been described as "extroverted...light and airy". Its circular courtroom under a dome was a unique element meant to symbolize the equality of people. Two additional complementary buildings were subsequently constructed on the immediate northern side to function as the library of the court.

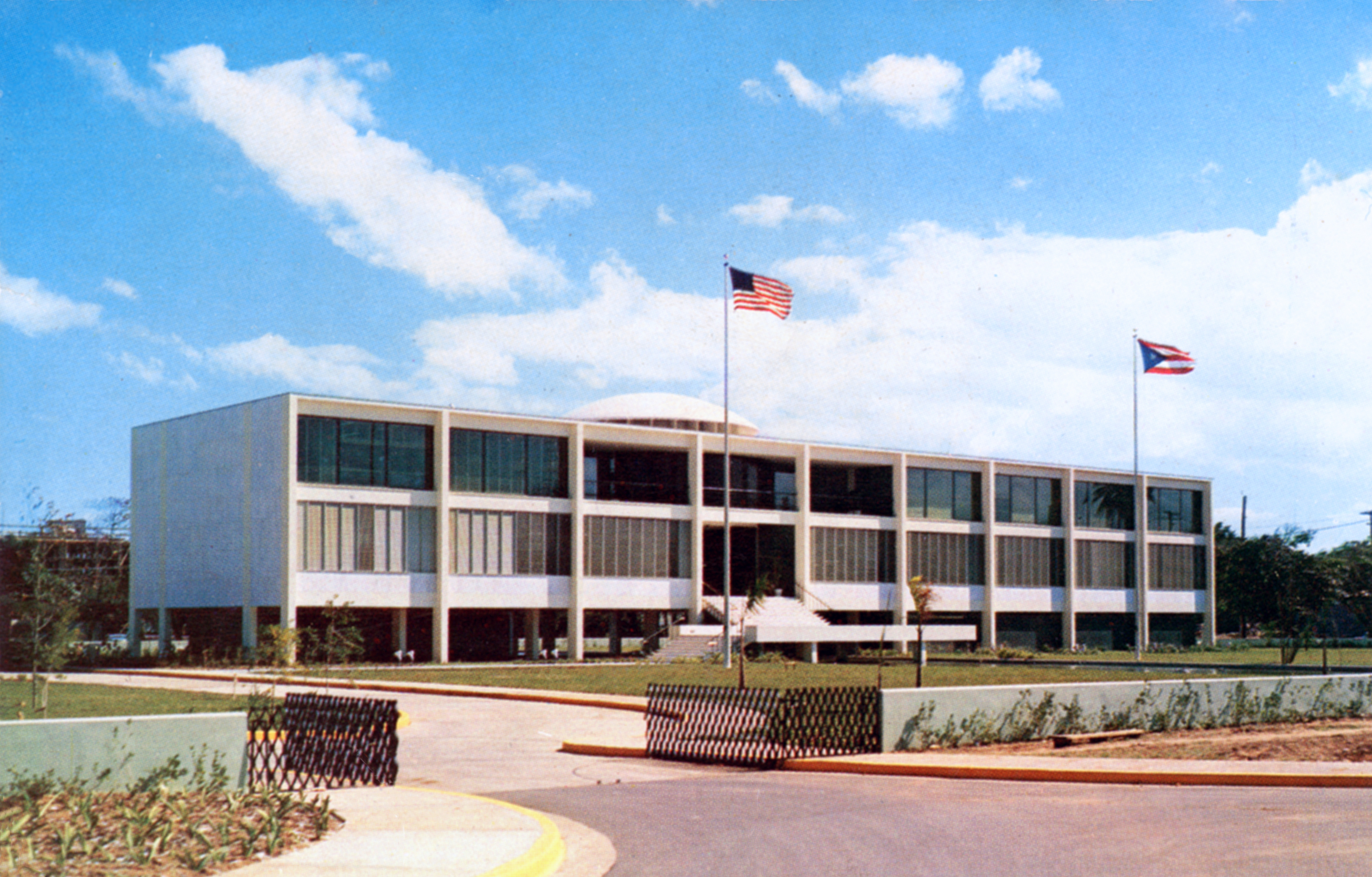
Postcard image of the Supreme Court Building, 1958

== See also ==
- National Register of Historic Places listings in San Juan, Puerto Rico
