= Segundo Cardona =

Puerto Rican architect and developer

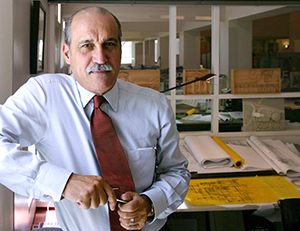
- Born: Segundo Cardona Colom; 1950 (age 75–76); San Juan, Puerto Rico
- Died: October 23, 2026 (aged 75–76); Barcelona, Spain
- Education: University of Puerto Rico
- Occupations: Architect and developer
- Known for: Architecture
- Notable work: BPPR Urban Hub; BPPR Popular Center Expansion; Paseo Puerta de Tierra; Coliseo de Puerto Rico; Biblioteca del Tribunal Supremo; UPR Law School Building Expansion; El Portal Rain Forest Center at El Yunque National Forest
- Awards: Fellow of the American Institute of Architects (FAIA), Henry Klumb Award

Segundo Cardona Colom FAIA (born 1950 – October 23, 2026) was a Puerto Rican architect and developer. His work has been recognized by the American Institute of Architects (AIA), by the Colegio de Arquitectos y Arquitectos Paisajistas de Puerto Rico (Puerto Rico College of Architects and Landscape Architects, or CAAPPR, for its acronym in Spanish), as well as by the International Union of Architects. In 2006, Cardona was elected as Fellow of the American Institute of Architects. In 1992, he was awarded the Henry Klumb Award.

== Education and career ==
Cardona entered the School of Architecture of the University of Puerto Rico and was a member of its first graduating class, obtaining a B.Arch in 1972. He was a design professor in the UPR (1974–1984) and was principal at Segundo Cardona Architects before co-founding in 1984 Sierra Cardona Ferrer (now known as SCF Architects) with partners Luis Sierra and Alberto Ferrer. He has remained active in academic and civic affairs.

In addition to teaching architectural design at the University of Puerto Rico, Cardona has been a guest lecturer, visiting professor and juror at diverse institutions and universities including North Carolina State University School of Design, The Catholic University of America, The Contemporary Museum of Art in Puerto Rico, The Polytechnic University of Puerto Rico, and the Pontifical Catholic University of Puerto Rico School of Architecture. He is also a past president of the Puerto Rican Architects Association or Colegio de Arquitectos y Arquitectos Paisajistas de Puerto Rico (CAAPPR). In 2001, Cardona became a member of the Board of Trustees of the University of Puerto Rico, and was President of the Board from 2004 to 2007. An architectural monograph covering thirty-five years of his work was published in 2008.

In 2013, Cardona won a competition to rebuild the Cathedral of Our Lady of the Assumption, Port-au-Prince, Haiti. In 2017, he participated in the UIA World Architects Congress in Seoul and received the Public Space Award for his design of the Paseo Puerta de Tierra, a promenade that connects two important tourist destinations in Puerto Rico.

== Honors ==
- HENRY KLUMB AWARD of the Colegio de Arquitectos y Arquitectos Paisajistas de Puerto Rico, 1992
- FELLOW of the American Institute of Architects, Washington DC, USA, 2006

== A selection of recent projects ==
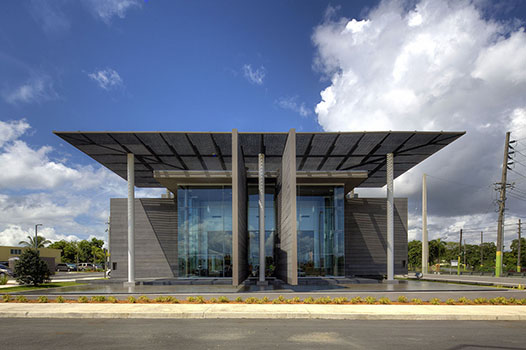
Universal Insurance, Canóvanas (2013).

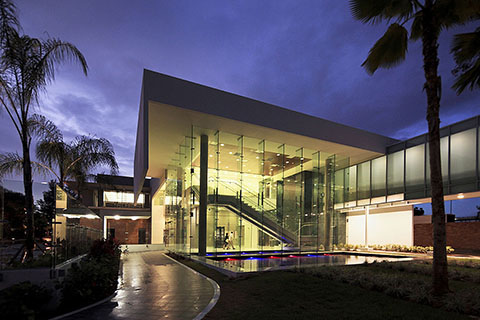
Library of the Supreme Court of Puerto Rico (2013).

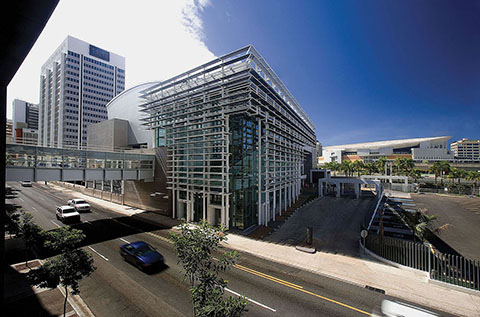
BPPR Popular Center Expansion / Phase II, San Juan (2008).
- Urban Hub at BPPR, San Juan (2018)
- Universal Insurance Client Service Branch at Bayamón (2018)
- Plaza Popular at BPPR, San Juan (2017)
- Paseo Puerta de Tierra, San Juan (2017)
  Universal Insurance Client Service Branch at Canóvanas (2013)
- Lofthaus, San Juan (2013)
- Reconstruction of the Cathedral of Our Lady of the Assumption, Port-au-Prince, Haiti [unbuilt] (2012)
- Library of the Supreme Court of Puerto Rico, San Juan (2011)
- BPPR Popular Center Expansion, Phase II, San Juan (2011)
- Pontifical Catholic University of Puerto Rico School of Architecture, Forteza Historic Building, Ponce (2010)
- Universal Insurance Client Service Branch at Caguas (2009)

== Other significant projects ==
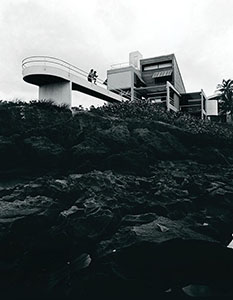
Casa de la Punta, Dorado, PR (1978) Photo by Max Toro Mattei.

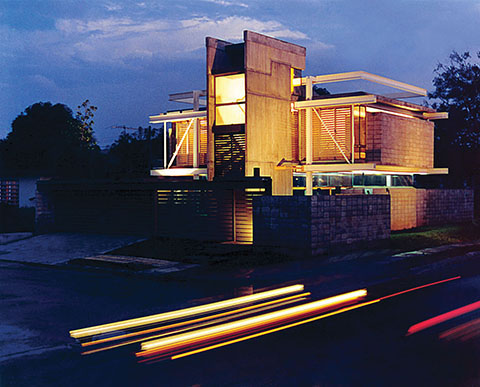
Casa de Acero, Río Piedras, PR (1980) Photo by Max Toro Mattei.

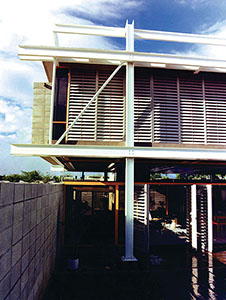
Casa de Acero, detail. Río Piedras, PR (1980) Photo by Max Toro Mattei.
- V. Suárez & Co. Headquarters and Warehouse ∙ Atlantic Commercial Park, Bayamón (2008)
- Condominio Luchetti 1212, San Juan
- Mennonite General Hospital, Cayey
- BPPR Popular Center Expansion Phase I, San Juan
- Quantum Metro Center Residential Towers, San Juan
- Coliseo de Puerto Rico, San Juan (2004)
- Tren Urbano Stations: Hato Rey (Tren Urbano station), Cupey, Centro Médico, San Francisco, Las Lomas, Martínez Nadal, Torrimar, Jardines; San Juan (2004)(Tren Urbano de San Juan)
- The Corporate Center at Roosevelt Avenue, San Juan
- Doral Financial Headquarters, San Juan
- Universal Insurance Headquarters, Guaynabo
- Plaza Athenee Condominium, Guaynabo
- Expansion to the Law School ∙ Universidad de Puerto Rico, Río Piedras
- Paseo del Parque: Centro de Gobierno y Biblioteca Municipal, Bayamón
- Smithsonian ∙ Centro de Investigaciones Marinas, Panamá [unbuilt]
- Biblioteca UPRB, Universidad de Puerto Rico, Bayamón
- Air Traffic Control Tower at Luis Muñoz Marín International Airport, Carolina
- El Portal Rainforest Center at El Yunque National Forest, Río Grande
- AT&T Wireless ∙ Cingular (Cellular One), Guaynabo
- Casa Miramar [Casa Felices], San Juan
- Pabellón Nacional de Puerto Rico en la Expo '92, Sevilla
- Villa Las Brisas ∙ Cluster 4 Río Mar, Río Grande
- Puerto Rico Telephone Company Headquarters, San Juan
- Edificio de Oficinas SCF/LIH, Guaynabo
- Casa Villa Caparra, Guaynabo
- Guardian Insurance Building, St. Thomas, USVI
- Centro Judicial de Carolina, Carolina
- Instituto San Pablo ∙ Hospital San Pablo, Bayamón
- La Bodega ∙ Méndez & Co., Guaynabo
- Fundación Luis Muñoz Marín, Trujillo Alto (1987)
- Condominio Caparra Classic, Guaynabo
- Banco de Boston: Sucursal Mínima, Carolina (1986)
- Oficinas Ejecutivas ∙ Puerto Rico Telephone Company Fase II, San Juan (1985)
- Citibank: Mini-sucursal, Arecibo (1985)
- Citibank Miami, Miami, FL (1983)
- Piscina Municipal de Adjuntas, Adjuntas (1980)
- Casa de Acero [Casa Cardona], Río Piedras (1980)
- Centro de Servicios Múltiples de Hato Tejas, Bayamón (1980)
- Estación Postal de Quebradillas, Quebradillas (1978)
- Casa de la Punta (Casa Ferrer), Dorado (1978)
- Hato Rey Centro, Hato Rey (1978)
- Biblioteca General Pública de Puerto Rico, San Juan [unbuilt] (1978)
- Santuario a la Virgen de la Providencia, San Juan [unbuilt] (1978)
- Torre San Pablo ∙ Hospital San Pablo, Bayamón (1977)
- Casa Segarra, Guaynabo (1976)
- Condominio Park Gardens, Río Piedras (1975)
- Communications Building, Puerto Rico Telephone Company Phase I, San Juan (1975)
- Casa Marín · Charneco, Urbanización La Campiña (1974)
- Casa Colom · Báez, Mayagüez (1973)
- Casa Cardona · Colom, Toa Alta (1972)

Project list sources

== Project awards and recognition ==
2017

- Medal Winner · Public Space, "Friendly and Inclusive Spaces 2017" Worldwide Competition by the International Union of Architects (UIA): Paseo Puerta de Tierra
- Honor Award, AIA Florida/Caribbean: Paseo Puerta de Tierra
- Outstanding Work, Colegio de Ingenieros y Agrimensores de Puerto Rico, Paseo Puerta de Tierra

2014

- Nomination to MCHAP (Mies Crown Hall Americas Prize): Puerto Rico Supreme Court Library by Council of MCHAP Nominators, Chicago, Illinois.

2013

- Honor Award, Commercial Category · XXII Cemex Building Award · Puerto Rico Edition: Lofthaus, San Juan
- Honor Award, AIA Puerto Rico: Universal Insurance · Client Service Branch, Canóvanas
- Honor Mention, X

III Bienal CAAPPR: Universal Insurance · Client Service Branch, Canóvanas 2012

- XXI Cemex Building Award, Residential Category · Puerto Rico Edition: Quantum Metro Center
- XXI Cemex Building Award, Institutional Category · Puerto Rico Edition: Library of the Supreme Court of Puerto Rico
- First Place, Competition for the Cathedral of Our Lady of the Assumption, Port-au-Prince, Haiti

2011

- XX Cemex Building Award, Institutional Category · Puerto Rico Edition: Library of the Supreme Court of Puerto Rico
- XII Bienal CAAPPR, Honor Award: Library of the Supreme Court of Puerto Rico
- Merit Award, AIA Puerto Rico: Library of the Supreme Court of Puerto Rico

2010

- Honor Mention, AIA Puerto Rico: School of Architecture, Pontifical Catholic University of Puerto Rico

2009

- XVIII Cemex Building Award, Industrial Category · Puerto Rico Edition: V. Suárez Atlantic Commercial Park
- MetalMag Award 2nd Place, Metal Construction: V. Suárez Atlantic Commercial Park

2008

- XVII Cemex Building Award · Puerto Rico Edition, Residential, Second Place: Luchetti 1212, San Juan
- XVII Cemex Building Award · Puerto Rico Edition, Commercial/Industrial, Second Place: Universal Group: Client Service Branch, Mayagüez
- Prime Site Award, Facilities Media Group: Coliseo de Puerto Rico

2007

- XVI Cemex Building Award · Puerto Rico Edition, Commercial/Industrial: BPPR Altamira Office and Parking Building
- VI FCAA Bienal: Honor Mention to Segundo Cardona for his outstanding work and contributions to Caribbean Architecture
- Prime Site Award 2007, Facilities Media Group: Coliseo de Puerto Rico

2006

- Test of Time Award, AIA Puerto Rico Chapter: House at Breñas Point (aka Casa de la Punta or Casa Ferrer)
- Honor Award URBE: SCF Arquitectos, Award to architectural practice committed to good architecture and a livable city
- International Large Venue of the Year, Pollstar Awards: Coliseo de Puerto Rico
- Project of the Year, Mortgage Bankers Association: La Cima de Torrimar
- XV Cemex Building Award · Puerto Rico Edition, First Place in Institucional: Coliseo de Puerto Rico
- XV Cemex Building Award · Puerto Rico Edition, First Place in Residential: La Cima de Torrimar
- XV Cemex Building Award · Puerto Rico Edition, Honor Mention: Tren Urbano Stations: Hato Rey, Cupey, Centro Médico y Jardines, San Juan
- XV Cemex Building Award · International Edition, Third Place in Institutional Category: Coliseo de Puerto Rico

2004

- Third Place, Concurso de Diseño Nueva Vivienda para Puerto Rico, Departamento de la Vivienda

2003

- Honor Mention, AIA Puerto Rico: Banco Popular Center, Expansion and Remodeling

2002

- Honor Mention, AIA Puerto Rico: Doral Financial

2001

- Honor Award, VI Bienal de Arquitectura: Law School Expansion, Universidad de Puerto Rico

1999

- National Architecture Prize, V Bienal de Arquitectura, CAAPPR: Biblioteca CUTB
- First Prize, V Bienal de Arquitectura, CAAPPR: Centro de Gobierno de Bayamón

1998

- Excellence in Design Award, AIA Florida: Biblioteca CUTB
- Honor Award, Premio URBE: Hospital Menonita, Cayey

1996

- Honor Award, Premio URBE: El Portal de El Yunque: Centro de Visitantes de El Yunque, Bosque Tropical del Caribe
- Honor Award, AIA: Biblioteca, Colegio Universitario Tecnológico de Bayamón (CUTB)
- Honor Award, Premio URBE: Biblioteca CUTB, Bayamón

1994

- Honor Award, Premio URBE: Biblioteca Carnegie
- Honor Award, Premio URBE: Torre de Control, Aeropuerto Internacional Luis Muñoz Marín

1993

- Honor Award, Work in Concrete, Asociación de Hormigoneras Premezclado de Puerto Rico: Villa Las Brisas, Río Mar, Río Grande

1992

- Honor Award, Premio URBE: Las Vistas Shopping Village
- Honor Award, AIA, Región de Florida: Pabellón Nacional de Puerto Rico, Exposición Universal, Sevilla, España

1991

- Honor Award, Premio URBE: Fundación Luis Muñoz Marín
- Mención, Premio URBE: Residencia Miguel Ferrer, Guaynabo

1989

- Mención de Honor, AIA: Fundación Luis Muñoz Marín, Trujillo Alto

1987

- Puerto Rico Overall Outstanding Project, Colegio de Ingenieros & Agrimensores: Centro Judicial de Carolina, Carolina

1986

- Mention, AIA Puerto Rico: Banco Nacional de Puerto Rico, Hato Rey
- Honor Award, Excellence in Design, AIA Puerto Rico: Mini Sucursal Citibank, Arecibo
- Honor Award, Excellence in Design, AIA Florida: Mini Sucursal Citibank, Arecibo

1984

- Merit Citation, AIA Puerto Rico: Parque para Niños Impedidos, Guaynabo

1983

- First Place, Design Competition: Parking Building and Plaza for the Faculty of the Medical Sciences School, University of Puerto Rico

1982

- Merit Citation, Excellence in Architectural Design, AIA Puerto Rico: El Vedado Townhouses, Hato Rey
- Honor Award, Excellence in Architectural Design, AIA Puerto Rico: Residencia Cardona-Alvarez (Casa de Acero)

1980

- Honor Award, Excellence in Architectural Design, AIA Puerto Rico: Adjuntas Municipal Pool

1978

- Honor Award, Excellence in Architectural Design, AIA Puerto Rico: Quebradillas USPS Postal Office Building
- First Place in Design Competition, Hato Tejas Diagnostic and Treatment Center
- First Place in Design Competition: Santuario de la Virgen de la Providencia, Nuevo Centro de San Juan

1977

- Merit Citation, Excellence in Architectural Design, AIA Puerto Rico: Park Gardens Condominium

Award sources

== See also ==
- List of people from Puerto Rico
- List of Puerto Rican architects
- Architecture of Puerto Rico

== Bibliography ==
- Rodríguez, Francisco Javier (2010). Arquitectura Contemporánea en Puerto Rico 1993–2010. American Institute of Architects Capítulo de Puerto Rico / Escuela de Arquitectura de la Universidad de Puerto Rico. ISBN 978-0982991114.
- Mignucci, Andrés (1992). Arquitectura Contemporánea en Puerto Rico 1976-1992. American Institute of Architects Capítulo de Puerto Rico.
- Moré, Gustavo L. (2005). 01 Arquigrafías: Monografías de Arquitectura Latinoamericana: SIERRA CARDONA FERRER. Editora de Arquitectura Antillana.
- Cardona, Segundo; Hermida-Espada, Teresa, eds. (2008). Segundo Cardona. DASE. ISBN 978-0-615-15402-2.
- Rancier, Omar (2006). Arquitectos Iberoamericanos: Siglo XXI. Fomento Cultural Banamex, DF, México. ISBN 968-5234-58-2.
- Russell, AIA, James S. (1 July 2002). "Will a New Wave of Tropical Modernism Restore San Juan's Luster?". Architectural Record. New York: McGraw-Hill, Inc.
