= SECORE =

Organization for coral reef restoration

- Founded: 2002
- Founder: Rotterdam Zoo; Dr. Dirk Petersen
- Purpose: Coral reef conservation
- Method: research education outreach restoration
- Key people: Dr. Dirk Petersen; Mike Brittsan, M.Sc.
- Website: http://www.secore.org

SECORE (SExual COral REproduction) is an international non-profit organization focused on coral reef conservation. The group has over sixty supporters in North America, Europe and Japan, and comprises public aquariums, institutes, and universities. Founded in 2001 at the Rotterdam Zoo in the Netherlands, the organization has been developing methods of captive coral reproduction and preservation, citing studies that have predicted coral reefs could be extinct within decades due to climate change.

== Background ==
Based on the coral reproduction research of Dirk Petersen at the Rotterdam Zoo in The Netherlands, SECORE was born in 2002. Petersen's findings led to innovative techniques on the use sexual coral reproduction for coral reef conservation. Established by the aquarium community and coral conservation scientists, SECORE initially focused on ex situ conservation and later as well on reef restoration (in situ conservation).

In 2004, Mike Brittsan, M.Sc., of the Columbus Zoo and Aquarium joined SECORE to take over the leading role in the United States. Over the years, both institutions – in collaboration with other organizations – instituted a workshop program with the stated goals of both training experts in SECORE techniques and bringing disparate institutions together for a common cause. SECORE supports research and technology discoveries in various fields, such as coral restoration, coral population genetics or coral cryopreservation.

Together with its more than 60 supporting partner institutions, SECORE reaches millions of people to spread the word about the dramatic situation of our ocean and what we can do about it. In 2018, they were subject of coverage from VICE News for their work in the coral reefs of Curaçao.

== Supporters ==
=== Asia ===
- (Japan) Ochanomizu University
- (Malaysia) Marine Research Station Layang Layang

=== Europe ===
- (England) The Deep
- (England) National Marine Aquarium
- (France) Aquarium La Rochelle
- (France) Océanopolis
- (Germany) Aquazoo – Löbbecke Museum in Düsseldorf
- (Germany) Cologne Zoo
- (Germany) Hagenbeck Zoo
- (Germany) Ruhr University Bochum
- (Germany) University of Duisburg-Essen
- (Germany) Wilhelma Stuttgart
- (Italy) Acquario di Genova
- (Monaco) Musee Oceanographique
- (Netherlands) Artis Zoo
- (Netherlands) Burgers Zoo
- (Netherlands) Rotterdam Zoo
- (Netherlands) Wageningen University
- (Portugal) Oceanario de Lisboa
- (Russia) Planet Neptune Aquarium
- (Spain) Zoo Aquarium de Madrid
- (Sweden) The Maritime Museum and Aquarium in Gothenburg
- (Sweden) Skansen-Akvariet

=== North America ===
- (Netherlands Antilles) Curaçao Sea Aquarium
- (United States) Audubon Aquarium of the Americas
- (United States) Aquarium in Moody Gardens
- (United States) Berkshire Museum Aquarium
- (United States) Birch Aquarium
- (United States) Columbus Zoo and Aquarium
- (United States) Dallas Aquarium at Fair Park
- (United States) Discovery World
- (United States) Downtown Aquarium, Houston
- (United States) The Florida Aquarium
- (United States) Georgia Aquarium
- (United States) Hawaii Institute of Marine Biology
- (United States) Houston Zoo
- (United States) Indianapolis Zoo
- (United States) Minnesota Zoo
- (United States) National Aquarium in Baltimore
- (United States) National Aquarium in Washington, D.C.
- National Zoological Park (United States)
- (United States) New England Aquarium
- (United States) North Carolina Aquarium at Fort Fisher
- (United States) North Carolina Aquarium at Pine Knoll Shores
- (United States) Omaha's Henry Doorly Zoo
- (United States) Pennsylvania State University
- (United States) Pittsburgh Zoo & PPG Aquarium
- (United States) Point Defiance Zoo & Aquarium
- (United States) Seattle Aquarium
- (United States) Seaworld Orlando
- (United States) Seaworld Texas
- (United States) Shedd Aquarium
- (United States) University of Houston
- (United States) Virginia Living Museum
- (United States) Virginia Marine Science Museum

== See also ==
- Issues with coral reefs
- Iliana Baums
