= House at Breñas Point =

Building in Dorado, Puerto Rico

- Casa de la Punta (in Spanish); Casa Ferrer (in Spanish)
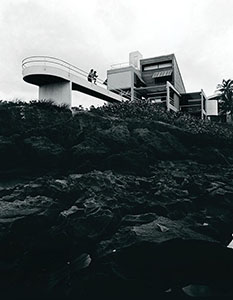
- House at Breñas Point. View from coast.
- Alternative names: Casa de la Punta; Casa de Breñas

General information
- Type: Private Residence
- Architectural style: Modernism
- Location: Dorado, Puerto Rico
- Completed: 1978

Technical details
- Structural system: reinforced concrete; masonry; wood

Design and construction
- Architect: Segundo Cardona FAIA
- Awards and prizes: 2006 American Institute of Architects (AIA) Test of Time, Puerto Rico Chapter

The House at Breñas Point (Spanish: Casa de la Punta; "House at the Point"), designed by Segundo Cardona FAIA, was built in 1978 with the original purpose of serving as a week-end home for a family of six: a couple and their four children, on a site shaped like a peninsula on Breñas Beach. This small house, built with modest materials, has endured the wrath of three major hurricanes and several tropical storms and has merged with the landscape while maintaining a distinctive presence within it. Since its construction it has become a landmark and point of reference for locals. It is also considered an architectural landmark for its modern interpretation of a minimal tropical dwelling in modest traditional Puerto Rican construction materials and methods: reinforced concrete and wood.

The house has been preserved by its owners in its original state. In 2006 it received the American Institute of Architects (AIA) Test of Time Award (Puerto Rico Chapter) for withstanding the test of time for more than twenty-five years since its construction. In 2014 it was included in the architectural guidebook: La Vereda Tropical: Down Where the Trade Winds Blow, published by Benjamin Vargas FAIA, as a record of all of the buildings that have been considered for the Test of Time Award by the AIA Puerto Rico Chapter from 1990 to 2009.

== Concept and Structure ==
The residence was accommodated along a visual axis that stars at the lot's entrance, stretches to its tip, and connects with one of the ends of a small bay shaped by the beach. Two volumes in concrete, laid out symmetrically in relation to a diagonal axis, contain the bedrooms and the kitchen. The central space, including a living room and a family room covered with a wooden sloping roof aligned with the main view, follows the direction underlined by the organizing axis. The design included built-in furniture that maximizes the enjoyment of views towards the ocean.

The whole structure was raised on columns to avoid disturbing the natural rocky topography. Some of the columns were elevated to form several porticos that frame different views of the sea and the beach. The total design effect is the creation with simple materials of a structure that does not pretend to blend with the landscape. Instead, it should be perceived as a constructed object posed on the landscape, with subtle references, in its architectural expression, to a ship.

== Gallery ==
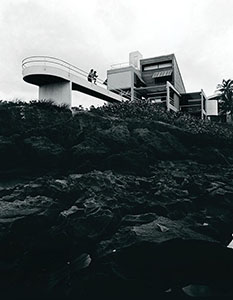

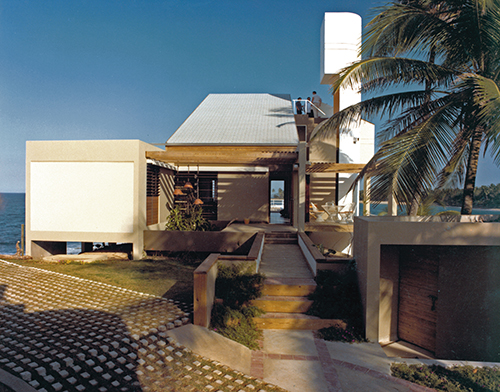

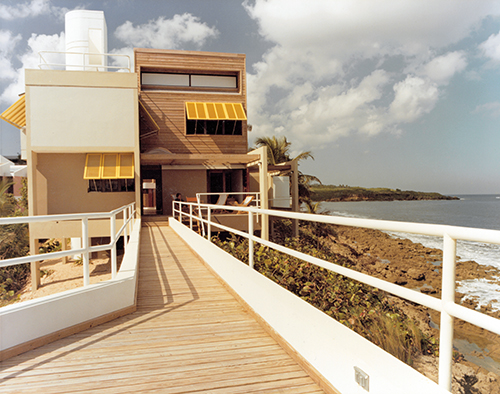

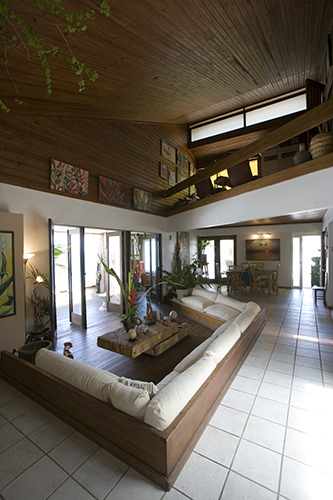

== See also ==
- List of Puerto Rican architects
