= Facundo Bueso Sanllehí =

Puerto Rican physicist and educator (1905–1960)

- Born: January 5, 1905; Mexico City, Mexico
- Died: January 24, 1960; Isla Verde, Puerto Rico
- Resting place: Buxeda Memorial Park Cemetery, Río Piedras, Puerto Rico
- Citizenship: US Citizen (June 27, 1932)
- Education: University of Puerto Rico (B.S.); University of Chicago (M.S., Ph.D.)
- Spouse: Carmen Luisa Nieva Heyliger
- Children: 3
- Awards: Scoville Medal (1927, University of Puerto Rico), Proficiency Medal from the Reserve Officers Training Corps (ROTC) (1927), Guggenheim Fellow in Physics (1940, 1941), Hall of Fame of Sports in Puerto Rico (1958)
- Scientific career
- Fields: Physics
- Workplaces: University of Puerto Rico, Río Piedras
- Thesis: Rotational Analysis of the 2900Å Band of CO2+ (1941)
- Doctoral advisor: Robert S. Mulliken (Nobel Laureate of Chemistry, 1966)

Facundo Bueso Sanllehí (February 5, 1905 – January 24, 1960) was a physicist, educator, science communicator and athlete. He was born on February 5, 1905, in Mexico City, Mexico. His family was forced to flee to Spain in 1915 because of the Mexican Revolution. Later in 1917 the family moved from Spain to San Juan, Puerto Rico.

In 1927 he obtained a B.S. degree in Physics (Magna Cum Laude) from the University of Puerto Rico, Río Piedras Campus. He became a Teaching Assistant of Physics before obtaining his B.S. degree (1926–1927). He obtained an M.S. degree in Physics from the University of Chicago in 1929. In 1941 he earned his Ph.D. from the University of Chicago. In 1940 and in 1941 he received the prestigious Guggenheim Fellowship for Physics for studies in the field of band spectra.

He worked at the University of Puerto Rico, Río Piedras campus from 1926 to 1960. He was a Physics Professor, Chairman of the Department of Physics, Dean of the College of Arts and Sciences. In 1943 he was named Dean of the Faculty of Natural Sciences. Facundo Bueso was the first person to hold that position. Bueso died on January 24, 1960, when the motor boat in which he traveled was overturned near Isla Verde, Puerto Rico.

He was an excellent communicator of science and participated in many radio and TV programs. He was inducted into the Puerto Rican Sports Pavilion, also known as 'El Pabellón de la Fama del Deporte Puertorriqueño,' in 1950,("El Pabellón de la Fama del Deporte Puertorriqueño") and the Hall of Fame of Sports in Puerto Rico ('El Salón de la Fama del Deporte en Puerto Rico') on January 25, 1958. The University of Puerto Rico's Río Piedras campus has a historical building named in his honor, which is part of the Faculty of Natural Sciences.

== Early life and education ==
He was born in Mexico City on February 5, 1905. His father, Francisco Bueso, was a master carpenter from Valencia, Spain, and his mother was Eulalia Sanllehí, hailed from Cataluña, Spain. He had an older brother named Francisco ("Paco") and a younger brother named Andrés, who became a painter. In 1915, due to the Mexican Revolution, his family was forced to flee to Barcelona, Spain. Later, they moved to Puerto Rico to work for Rafael Margarida in Río Piedras, Puerto Rico.

Bueso and his brothers, Francisco and Andrés, were enrolled in the Escuela Modelo de la Universidad. An experimental school of the Education Faculty of the University of Puerto Rico established in 1902 (presently called "Escuela Laboratorio Elemental de la Universidad de Puerto Rico"). Classes were conducted in English, a language Bueso and his brothers did not speak. Consequently, he was initially placed in the fourth grade but was later reassigned to a grade corresponding to his age. He was the valedictorian of his class in 1919 and graduated from the experimental high school of the University of Puerto Rico in 1923 with honors. ("Escuela Superior de la Universidad de Puerto Rico")

Bueso spent a year at Rensselaer Polytechnic Institute with the intention of studying Electrical Engineering.

After that year he returned to Puerto Rico and enrolled in the College of Arts and Sciences at the University of Puerto Rico (1924). He entered the Army Reserve Officers' Training Corps (R.O.T.C.) program; served as the President of the Student and Faculty Council in 1927; and became a member of the Phi Sigma Alpha fraternity. He obtained a B.S. degree in Physics from the University of Puerto Rico in 1927 graduating Magna Cum Laude. Upon graduation, he was awarded the Scoville Medal from the Department of Physics and the Proficiency medal from the R.O.T.C.

During the summer of 1927, Facundo Bueso served as an Instructor with the rank of Second Lieutenant in the Citizens' Military Training Camp (C.T.M.C.). He served as Second Lieutenant in the Puerto Rico Army National Guard from 1927–1929.

Facundo Bueso obtained a Master of Science degree in Physics from the University of Chicago in 1929. Among his teachers were Albert A. Michelson (Nobel Prize in Physics, 1907) and Arthur H. Compton (Nobel Prize, 1927). The title of his thesis was 'On the Spectrum of Germanium Tetrachloride and possibility of Nitrogen Isotopes.' He earned his Ph.D. in Physics from the University of Chicago in 1941. His doctoral thesis was titled 'Rotational Analysis of the 2900Å Band of CO_{2}^{+}". His thesis advisor was Robert S. Mulliken who was awarded the Nobel Prize in Chemistry in 1966 six years after Facundo Bueso's death. Facundo Bueso received the prestigious Guggenheim Fellowship in 1940 and 1941.

He worked at the University of Puerto Rico as Assistant Instructor in Physics (1926–34) before he had completed his Bachelor degree. He occupied the positions of Professor of Physics, Chairman of the Department of Physics, Dean of the College of Arts and Sciences, and Dean of the Faculty of Natural Sciences. He was the first Dean of the Faculty of Natural Sciences. The Faculty of Natural Sciences was created on July 16, 1943. Before that date it was known as the College of Arts and Sciences. As Dean of Natural Sciences, Facundo Bueso had many responsibilities. On many occasions he represented the Chancellor or the Natural Sciences Faculty.

Facundo Bueso married Carmen Luisa Nieva Heyliger from Mayagüez in 1936. She obtained a Bachelor's degree from the University of Puerto Rico (1935). She accompanied Facundo to Chicago where she studied to obtain a Master's degree in Home Economics with a minor in Textiles at the University of Chicago. She did not complete her degree. They had three children: Héctor Rafael, Luis Francisco ("Gugo") and Carmen Eulalia ("Carmín").

=== Professional associations and other organizations ===
Facundo Bueso was a member of: American Physical Society, American Association for the Advancement of Science. He was President of the Science Section of the "Ateneo Puertorriqueño" (1942). Bueso was listed in the "American Men and Women of Science Editions 1-11 Cumulative Index" (1983). Bueso was President of the civic organization "Club Rotario de Río Piedras" (1943-1944).

=== Amateur radio ===
Facundo Bueso became interested in radiotelegraphy as a teenager (c. 1920). He obtained a US government certification of amateur telegraphist in 1921. He obtained a Radio Operator, Commercial First Class License. Bueso's call signal was "4DA". He shared this hobby with important figures in Puerto Rico like Joaquín Agusty, Jesús T. Piñero, Ramón Mellado Parsons, Luis Rexach, J. Maduro Ramos and Enrique Camuñas among others in the Porto Rico Radio Club. This group of people were pioneers of radio since the first radio station arrived in Puerto Rico in 1922. The first AM radio station in Puerto Rico was WKAQ (it was the fifth in the world) and it was directed and administrated by Joaquín Agusty. During the summer of 1924 Facundo Bueso was hired as Radio Operator on board the ship named "S. S. Catherine."

=== Sports ===
Facundo Bueso was a multi-sport athlete. During his undergraduate college years at the University of Puerto Rico he practiced volleyball, basketball, baseball, and track and field. He received numerous trophies and awards in sports. Facundo Bueso was President of the Athletic Association ("Sociedad Atlética") at the University of Puerto Rico (1926–1927). He was member of the "Real San Juan" soccer team. While he was a student at the University of Chicago he practiced tennis. He played tennis in tournaments in singles and doubles in Puerto Rico. During his tenure as a faculty member the amount of time dedicated to sports decreased, but there are records of soccer games between Faculty and students. He was selected to be in the Puerto Rican Sports Pavilion ("El Pabellón de la Fama del Deporte Puertorriqueño") (1950) and the Hall of Fame of Sports in Puerto Rico ("El Salón de la Fama del Deporte en Puerto Rico")(January 25, 1958) together with Cosme Beitia, Hiram Bithorn, Rebekah Colberg, Sixto Escobar, Isidoro García, among other prominent Puerto Rican athletes.

=== Educator ===
Facundo Bueso distinguished himself for being an excellent educator, not only clear in his presentations but also with a joy and sense of humor that also can be seen in his science outreach essays or in accounts by his former students. Facundo Bueso wrote two Physics textbooks for use in High School ("Ciencias Físicas"). He contributed to a science section in a journal aimed at school teachers "Escuela". He wrote together with other prominent academics (Emilio S. Belaval, Ramón Lavandero, Arturo Morales Carrión, María Luisa Muñoz, and others) a comprehensive survey of Puerto Rico in a book with the title "Puerto Rico".

=== Public Communication of Science ===
Facundo Bueso had a commitment to improving the science literacy of the public, in particular the people of Puerto Rico. He presented hundreds of conferences on radio, TV, schools, clubs and universities. He wrote hundreds of science outreach essays for radio, TV, newspapers and magazines. He participated of public conferences, radio and TV interviews. In 1935 the government of Puerto Rico initiated a project of and educational series of programs called "Escuela del Aire." They transmitted educational programs through radio Monday through Friday's 9:30 am – 10:00 am and 3:00 pm – 3:30 pm. Bueso participated of this project "Escuela del Aire". WIPR also had evening education programs. Facundo Bueso had science outreach programs on WIPR radio, and later had programs in WIPR TV. He started a weekly 15-minute program in WIPR TV. Another TV program in which he participated was "Pregunte usted al ABC". This was a program in which the public asked questions and the three moderators were Luis A. Arrocena (expert in History and Literature), Antonio J. Colorado Capella (expert in Social Sciences) and Facundo Bueso (expert in Science). He participated of another popular TV program "Desafíe a los Expertos.

=== Other Organizations ===
Facundo Bueso represented the University of Puerto Rico in the Oak Ridge Associated Universities. This Institute gathered 35 universities of the south of the USA. Facundo Bueso was selected as Councilor for Oak Ridge Institute of Nuclear Studies (1951). Together with other Faculty, Facundo Bueso organized the 10th Regional Symposium from the Oak Ridge Institute of Nuclear Studies at the University of Puerto Rico, Río Piedras (January 24–25, 1957) and Mayagüez (January 28, 1957). Dr. Lewis L. Strauss, President of the United States Atomic Energy Commission attended this Symposium.

Facundo Bueso was a consultant for the Civil Defense of Puerto Rico. He wrote an article "Estudios sobre lluvia Radioactiva Puerto Rico."

== Death ==
Facundo Bueso died on January 24, 1960, in a motorboat accident 3–5 miles off the coast of the Isla Verde. Three persons were in the boat: Facundo Bueso, Kiko Pesquera and Roberto Ramos López. The conditions in the ocean were rough and the boat was overturned. They were near some coral reefs. Facundo Bueso was rescued by Santiago Panzardi but he was unconscious and had severe contusions on his forehead. He was taken to the Presbyterian Hospital and declared dead upon arrival. Only Kiko Pesquera survived the boating accident. This event impacted the people of Puerto Rico. The Puerto Rico Legislature, the House of Representatives and the Senate, expressed their grief and observed a minute of silence in memory of Facundo Bueso. His burial took place on January 25, 1960, with a funeral procession that started at the Faculty of Natural Sciences at the University of Puerto Rico. The Chancellor, all the Faculty, University administration staff, thousands of students, representatives of cultural circles, scientists, government officials and others participated of the funeral procession. His remains were buried at "Buxeda Memorial Park Cemetery" in Río Piedras.

== Legacy ==
The "Facundo Bueso Chair of Physics" was created and it was offered by the Chancellor Jaime Benítez Rexach to Dr. J. Robert Oppenheimer on February 29, 1960. The Spanish sculptor Francisco Vázquez Díaz "Compostela" (1898–1988) made a bust of Facundo Bueso (1961) of marble from the city of Caguas which is displayed in the Facundo Bueso building at the University of Puerto Rico, Río Piedras. This historical building of the Natural Sciences Faculty was designed by Henry Klumb. The building has an interesting "K" shape when seen from an aerial view. The artist Miguel Pou Becerra painted a portrait of Facundo Bueso that belongs to the Faculty of Natural Sciences. There is a public school with the name "Dr. Facundo Bueso" in San Juan. The "Premio Facundo Bueso" (also known as "Medalla Facundo Bueso") is a yearly award from the Department of Physics, University of Puerto Rico, Río Piedras campus to the most distinguished student in the area of Physics. This award is sponsored by the Bueso family.

== See also ==
- List of Puerto Ricans
