= RUM General Library =

Main library for the University of Puerto Rico at Mayagüez

Coordinates: 18°12′39.66″N 67°08′29.64″W

The RUM General Library (Spanish: Biblioteca del Recinto Universitario de Mayagüez) is the main library for the University of Puerto Rico at Mayagüez. It consists of a main library and a specialized collection.

== Building ==
The Mayagüez Campus General library building was inaugurated in 1963. It was designed by Henry Klumb. The main library has an area of approximately 109,064 square feet (10,132.4 m^{2}) and has three floors.

== Services ==
The Mayagüez Campus General Library serves the local campus community as well as residents of Mayagüez and nearby towns. It fully supports UPRM education and research mission and objectives by providing adequate library and information resources, facilities and services.

The library is divided in three principal areas: Technical Services, Services to the Public and Technological Services.

UPRM library holdings include 215,830 volumes; 5,259 journals; 263,982 microfiches; 12,719 microcards; 19,486 microfilms; 561,641 government documents; 949 films; 8,149 maps; 8,458 sound recordings; 606 musical scores; 375 sound magnetic tapes; 4,550 videocassettes; 5,109 CD/DVDs; 3,648 theses; 7.5 million United States patents, and 4 million United States-issued trademarks.

The library is a selective depository for publications of the U.S. government and one of the coordinating agencies of the Puerto Rico Census Data Center under the Planning Board of Puerto Rico. It serves as depository for the U.S. Census Bureau publications. The library has been a member of the Patent and Trademark Depository Library Program of the U.S. Patent and Trademark Office since March 1995. (It the only library outside the continental United States that is a member of that organization.)

It has a seating capacity of 774, eight individual study rooms for graduate students and faculty, eight study rooms for group discussions and collaborative work, a computer lab with 57 computers, and two library instruction classrooms. Also, it has a conference room and two smaller meeting rooms.
