= Ocotillo Desert Camp =

Worksite for Frank Lloyd Wright in Arizona

Coordinates: 33.2999°N 112.0170°W

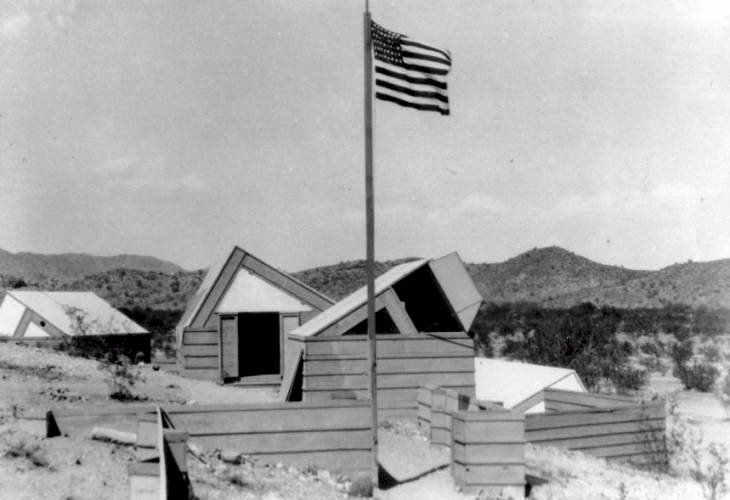
Ocotillo camp from the southeast. South Mountain in the background. Courtesy of Brian A. Spencer and the Frank Lloyd Wright Foundation, Scottsdale, Arizona

Ocotillo (also known as Ocatilla) was a temporary camp in Ahwatukee, Phoenix, Arizona, designed by the architect Frank Lloyd Wright and constructed in late January and early February 1929 by his draftsmen. The camp buildings, made out of wood and canvas, were intended by the architect to provide living and working spaces for himself and his draftsmen while they worked on a project (San Marcos In The Desert) for promoter, hotelier and entrepreneur Alexander J. Chandler. Dr. Chandler allowed Wright to use part of his land on which to construct the camp.

Wright and the draftsmen stayed at the camp until late spring, and returned to Wright's home, Taliesin, on May 31. Wright, presuming work would continue into the next year, intended to return to the camp. However, a fire in the camp that summer (followed by the stock market crash in October) prevented the cabins from ever being used again. The site has not held buildings since the summer of 1929. The camp was first acknowledged as a precursor to Wright's Taliesin West by architectural historian Henry-Russell Hitchcock in his book, In the Nature of Materials, 1887–1941: The Buildings of Frank Lloyd Wright, Duell, Sloan and Pearce, New York 1942. (97)

== History ==
In 1928, Wright worked as a consultant to Albert Chase McArthur, the architect of record for the Arizona Biltmore Hotel in Phoenix. During that time, Wright met Dr. Alexander John Chandler (a veterinarian turned businessman), who had conceived of a resort in the desert for well-paying clients, to be named "San Marcos In The Desert". In the article, "George Kastner and Frank Lloyd Wright," writer Randolph C. Henning wrote that after Wright met Chandler, he "spent two days with Chandler at the end of March 1928 to discuss Chandler's idea to develop a million dollar hotel." And "returned on April 5 to see the project's site on the southerly slope of South Mountain in the Salt River Range, approximately ten miles west of [the town of] Chandler." Wright continued throughout 1928 to talk to Chandler about the idea for the San Marcos In The Desert project. At the end of November 1928, Wright assembled a group of draftsmen to carry out the drawings for the complex.

The group left Wisconsin January 15 to work in Arizona. When the group arrived in Arizona to begin preparing drawings, it seemed to make more sense that instead of spending hundreds of dollars on accommodations and food for the employees with Wright and his family, they would create a desert camp on Chandler's land. The camp included a "living room, guesthouse, dining room, draftsmen's offices, kitchen, court, garage and even an electrical plant, using battened lower walls and wood-framed roofs covered with canvas."

In addition to Wright's wife, Olgivanna, their daughter Iovanna, and Olgivanna's daughter, Svetlana, the draftsmen that came to Arizona with Wright were: George Kastner, Heinrich Klumb, Cy Jahnke, Vladimir Karfik and Donald Walker. Once there, they were joined by Francis Sullivan, Wright's oldest son, Lloyd Wright, and local draftsman known as "Cueball" Kelly. Wright wrote about his inspiration for Ocotillo in An Autobiography:

We all arrived in Chandler to find that suitable quarters in which to live and work there would cost several thousand dollars for the rest of the winter, spring and summer. And we couldn't live there in summer.

I had always wanted to camp in that region.

Why not camp now? Why not spend the "rent" on a camp, comfortable and spacious enough to use not only in which to plan the building but from which it might be officered during construction. I took the idea to Dr. Chandler and said that if he could give me a site somewhere we would build the camp ourselves….

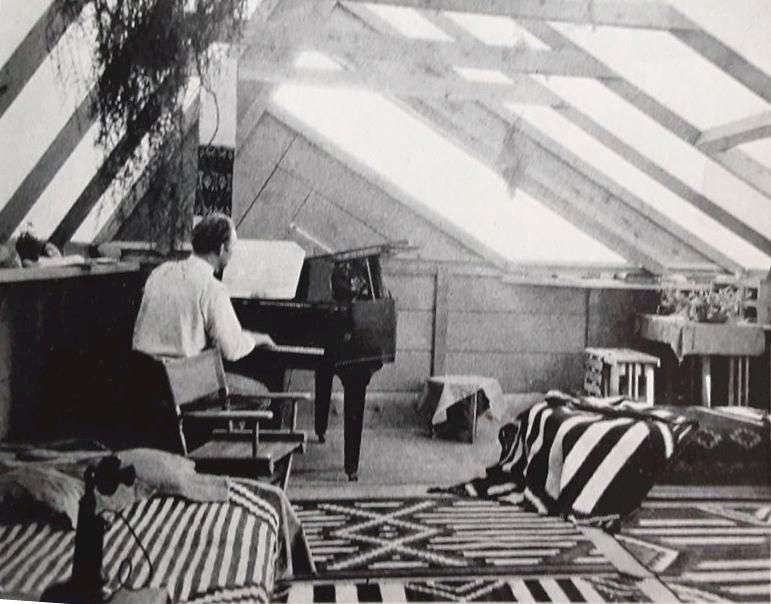
Lloyd Wright at the piano in the living room at Ocotillo. Courtesy of Brian A. Spencer and the Frank Lloyd Wright Foundation, Scottsdale, Arizona

The site (according to Henning's article) was selected on January 21, and Wright laid out the plans very quickly. On January 30, 1929, then-draftsman, George Kastner, wrote to his friend, Elsie Farber: "... I know ever since his first intention of coming down here, that he contemplated on the camp and that he even made some trial sketches that very time." Wright was inspired by the desert landscape (specifically the mountains). In his autobiography, the architect wrote

Now the architect and his helpers working away to build an architect's "compound," as we call it, in this unmitigated quotidian wilderness unchangeably changing.

We need fifteen cabins in all. Since they will be temporary, call them ephemera. You will soon see them all like a group of gigantic butterflies—say—conforming to the crown of the outcropping of splintered rock gently rising from the desert floor…..

The cabins themselves will be connected together by a low "staggered" box-board wall, in horizontal zig zag lines completing the enclosure just referred to as a "compound."

…. The one-two triangles seen by the mountain ranges around the site will be seen reflected in the gables of the camp. We will paint the triangles scarlet, make the cabins bloom with these scarlet one-triangles like the one-triangles of the ocatilla bloom itself.

So we call the camp "Ocatilla."

While Ocotillo lasted less than 6 months, its importance lies in how it allowed Wright to design a structure for himself in a completely different part of the country from anywhere he had ever lived. Wright used his design of Ocotillo as a "kind of plein air sketch of the desert, using its forms, shapes, and colors as models for adapting human life to the special conditions of desert living." The canvas roofs emphasized the bright sunlight, and the camp used the 30–60 degree angles, based on an abstraction of the surrounding mountain range. This temporary camp was a precursor to Taliesin West in Scottsdale, Arizona, begun 9 years later. In particular, Wright was interested in using the desert mountain ranges as inspiration in both designs, and including canvas roofs that could be opened throughout the day to adjust to light and heat in the desert.

=== The words "Ocatilla" and "Ocotillo" ===
Frank Lloyd Wright used the name "Ocatilla" for this compound. This was an incorrect spelling of the name for a desert plant known as Ocotillo. Wright sometimes used the word, but the word "Ocotillo" was used by George Kastner, who was one of the draftsman on the trip to Arizona. Kastner (1898–1938) was from Germany and took many of the photographs associated with the site. Kastner's complete collection is owned by architect and Wright-scholar Brian A. Spencer. Spencer's work led him to believe that "Ocotillo" is more correct. Upon his passing, it was Spencer's wishes that the Kastner Collection would be donated to the educational non-profit organization The Organic Architecture and Design Archives to support further research and discovery.
