= Iliana Baums =

Coral reef ecologist

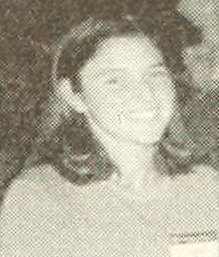
- Education: University of Miami
- Scientific career
- Workplaces: Pennsylvania State University
- Thesis: Genetic status of the Caribbean reef-building coral, Acropora palmata (2004)

Iliana B. Baums is a professor at Pennsylvania State University known for her work on coral reef ecology.

== Education and career ==
Baums' education began at the University of Tuebingen and the University of Bremen. She earned a Ph.D. from the University of Miami in 2004, where her dissertation received the F.G. Walton prize for best dissertation. In 2017 and 2018 Baums was a fellow at the Alexander von Humboldt Foundation in Germany. Baums joined the Pennsylvania State University in 2006 and, as of 2022, is a professor in the department of biology.

== Research ==
Baums' early research examined the genetic diversity in Elkhorn coral and the use of genetic tools to aid restoration efforts in coral reefs. She has used genetic tools to track the distribution of Porites lobata, Porites astreoides, and the connections between corals and the organisms that live within the coral tissue. Following the Deepwater Horizon oil spill, Baums investigated the impact of the dispersant on deep-sea corals in the Gulf of Mexico. Baums' research has revealed that when corals mutate, they are able to pass on beneficial mutations to the next generation and she has dated elkhorn corals found in the Caribbean to more than 5000 years old.

== Selected publications ==
- Baums, Iliana B.; Miller, Margaret W.; Hellberg, Michael E. (2005). "Regionally isolated populations of an imperiled Caribbean coral, Acropora palmata". Molecular Ecology. 14 (5): 1377–1390. Bibcode:2005MolEc..14.1377B. doi:10.1111/j.1365-294X.2005.02489.x. ISSN 0962-1083. PMID 15813778. S2CID 6345970.
- Baums, Iliana B.; Paris, Claire B.; Chérubin, Laurent M. (2006). "A bio-oceanographic filter to larval dispersal in a reef-building coral". Limnology and Oceanography. 51 (5): 1969–1981. Bibcode:2006LimOc..51.1969B. doi:10.4319/lo.2006.51.5.1969. S2CID 6663638.
- Baums, Iliana B. (2008). "A restoration genetics guide for coral reef conservation". Molecular Ecology. 17 (12): 2796–2811. Bibcode:2008MolEc..17.2796B. doi:10.1111/j.1365-294X.2008.03787.x. ISSN 0962-1083. PMID 18482262. S2CID 22017194.
- Foster, Nicola L.; Paris, Claire B.; Kool, Johnathan T.; Baums, Iliana B.; Stevens, Jamie R.; Sanchez, Juan A.; Bastidas, Carolina; Agudelo, Claudia; Bush, Phillippe; Day, Owen; Ferrari, Renata (2012). "Connectivity of Caribbean coral populations: complementary insights from empirical and modelled gene flow: CARIBBEAN CORAL CONNECTIVITY". Molecular Ecology. 21 (5): 1143–1157. doi:10.1111/j.1365-294X.2012.05455.x. PMID 22276913. S2CID 9701167.
- DeLeo, Danielle M.; Ruiz-Ramos, Dannise V.; Baums, Iliana B.; Cordes, Erik E. (2016-07-01). "Response of deep-water corals to oil and chemical dispersant exposure". Deep Sea Research Part II: Topical Studies in Oceanography. The Gulf of Mexico Ecosystem - before, during and after the Macondo Blowout. 129: 137–147. Bibcode:2016DSRII.129..137D. doi:10.1016/j.dsr2.2015.02.028. ISSN 0967-0645.
