= Henry Klumb =

German architect (1905–1984)

Henry Klumb FAIA
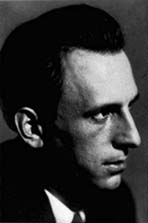
- Henry Klumb Architect. Photo AACUPR Universidad de Puerto Rico
- Born: 1905; Cologne, Germany
- Died: 1984 (aged 78–79); Hato Rey, Puerto Rico
- Occupation: Architect
- Awards: Fellow of the American Institute of Architects
- Practice: The Office of Henry Klumb
- Buildings: UPR Centro de Estudiantes Biblioteca José M. Lázaro, Hotel La Rada, Rafael A. Mangual Coliseum
- Projects: University of Puerto Rico, Río Piedras Campus Master Plan

Heinrich “Henry” Klumb (1905 in Cologne, Germany – 1984 in Hato Rey, Puerto Rico) was a German architect who worked in Puerto Rico during the mid-20th century.

== Education and early life ==
Klumb was born in Cologne, Germany, in 1905. An honors graduate of the Staatliche Bauschule School of Architecture in Cologne in 1926, his design education in Germany was influenced by the Deutsche Werkbund school, a fine arts program developed by German architect Herman Muthesius. Klumb emigrated to the United States in 1927, at the age of 22. He served as one of Frank Lloyd Wright's first apprentices (1929–1933) at Taliesin in Spring Green, Wisconsin. While under Wright's apprenticeship, Klumb worked on the design of the Ocotillo Desert Camp near Phoenix, and led the exhibition of Wright's work in Europe in 1931. In August, 1931, while coordinating a Frank Lloyd Wright travelling exhibit, Klumb married Else Schmidt, returning to the United States in November of that year. They had two children, Peter (born 1936), and Richard (born 1940). Klumb became a US citizen in 1937.

Klumb left Taliesin in 1933. In 1937 he established, along with Louis I. Kahn and Louis Metzinger, the Cooperative Planners firm in Philadelphia concentrating in the design of low-cost pre-fabricated houses. He also designed a major exhibition of Native American Art for the Golden Gate International Exposition of 1939 in San Francisco, where he lived before relocating to Los Angeles in 1941. In Los Angeles, he helped develop the city's master plan. He was responsible for the design of the Battaglia, Coty and Meador houses in Burbank, CA, as well as the Plumb house in Los Angeles during that period. Also in 1941, Klumb designed residential properties in the planned community of Greenbelt, Maryland, although the war prevented construction.

== Career ==
Having met New Deal brain trust planner Rexford Tugwell in the late 1930s, he was invited to move to Puerto Rico in 1944 and collaborate in the design of post-war modern Puerto Rico. He left Los Angeles on February 24, 1944, and settled in San Juan, Puerto Rico, where devoted most of the rest of his life designing many buildings there. Shortly after his arrival in Puerto Rico, Klumb worked in the Public Works Design Committee, where he was responsible for the design of multiple government structures in Puerto Rico. He also founded, along with Stephen Arneson, the ARKLU furniture factory, which produced distinctive tropical furniture utilizing native woods, leather and cord. Klumb also incorporated this tropical style of architecture in the design of his own home, Casa Klumb, which he began building in 1947.

His most important work on the island was the campus master plan for the University of Puerto Rico from 1946 to 1966, as well as the design of many of its buildings. Among these is the Facundo Bueso Building, an esteemed historic edifice situated at the University of Puerto Rico's Río Piedras campus, which houses the Faculty of Natural Sciences, Río Piedras Faculty Residences in 1946, the Río Piedras Agricultural Experimental Station, the UPR Museum of Anthropology, History and Art, the UPR General Library, the UPR Student Center in Río Piedras, the Agricultural Sciences Building in Mayagüez, an expansion of the UPR School of Tropical Medicine building in Puerta de Tierra and the UPR Law School building, among others. His public sector work attracted many private commissions, including private residences, churches and commercial buildings. His private design commissions, include the design of the campus and church of the Colegio San Ignacio de Loyola School, the San Ignacio of Loyola Parish, the La Rada Hotel, and the landmark churches Iglesia del Carmen and San Martin de Porres in Cataño. Later in life, his design work concentrated in work for several emerging pharmaceutical firms, including Eli Lilly, Parke-Davis, Baxter, Roche, Searle and Travenol.

== Later years and legacy ==
In 1968, he established the Klumb Foundation. In 1979, Klumb was elected to the College of Fellows of the American Institute of Architects. On November 20, 1984, he and his wife Else died in an automobile accident in San Juan, Puerto Rico. He was buried at Buxeda Memorial Park Cemetery in Río Piedras, Puerto Rico.

Throughout his life, Klumb mentored young Puerto Rican architects as well as talented young architects from the US mainland. These include Salvador Soltero, Segundo Cardona FAIA, Beatriz del Cueto FAIA and George McClintock.

== Chronology ==
- 1905: Born on February 24 in Cologne, Germany.
- 1918: Decides to become architect.
- 1926: Graduates with honors from the School of Architecture (Staatliche Bauschule) in Cologne.
- 1928: Applies for job with Frank Lloyd Wright.
- 1929: Begins working with Wright in Taliesin. From January to May, works at the Ocatilla camp in Arizona.
- 1931: On March 1, takes an exhibit of Wright's work to Europe. In August, marries Else Schmidt. In November, returns to the United States.
- 1933: Leaves Taliesin and moves to Brainerd, Minnesota. Forms partnership with Stephen Arneson.
- 1934: Moves to Washington, D.C.
- 1936: His first son, Peter, is born.
- 1937: In partnership with Louis I. Kahn on several projects. Obtains US citizenship.
- 1939: In August, moves to California. Begins working with the United States Department of the Interior in the Bureau of Indian Affairs. Designs exhibit Indian Arts and Crafts for the Golden Gate Exposition in San Francisco.
- 1940: His second son, Richard, is born.
- 1941: Exhibit Indian Arts and Crafts opens at the Museum of Modern Art in New York.
- 1942: Begins work as architectural planner in Los Angeles.
- 1944: On February 24, moves to Puerto Rico. Begins working with the Public Works Design Committee. With Stephen Arneson, establishes the ARKLU furniture factory.
- 1945: Works for the Puerto Rico Housing Authority. Begins private practice; firm known as The Office of Henry Klumb. Takes part in the design competition for the Caribe Hilton.
- 1946: Designs faculty residences at the University of Puerto Rico, Río Piedras. Designs the New York Department Store in Santurce.
- 1948: Designs the San Martín de Porres Sanctuary in Bayview, Cataño.
- 1953: Creates master plan for the Río Piedras and Mayagüez campuses of the University of Puerto Rico.
- 1957: Begins designs for the Parke, Davis pharmaceutical plant in Carolina.
- 1968: Establishes the Klumb Foundation.
- 1979: The American Institute of Architects makes him the first Fellow in Puerto Rico.
- 1981: The Puerto Rico Architects Association awards him the first Henry Klumb Award. Begins designs for the Ciba-Geigy pharmaceutical plant in New Jersey.
- 1984: On November 20, dies with his wife Else in a car crash in Hato Rey.

== Projects ==
Henry Klumb's projects included:

- University of Puerto Rico / Rio Piedras Campus Master Plan, San Juan, Puerto Rico.
- University of Puerto Rico / Mayaguez Campus Master Plan, Mayagüez, Puerto Rico.
- Colegio San Ignacio / Campus and buildings, San Juan, Puerto Rico.

== Buildings ==
- Centro de Estudiantes, UPR-Río Piedras, San Juan, Puerto Rico
- Biblioteca José M. Lázaro, UPR-Río Piedras, San Juan, Puerto Rico
- Museo de Historia, Antropología y Arte, UPR-Río Piedras, San Juan, Puerto Rico
- Centro de la Facultad, UPR-Río Piedras, San Juan Puerto Rico
- Colegio San Ignacio de Loyola, San Juan, Puerto Rico
- UPR Law School Building, UPR-Río Piedras, San Juan, Puerto Rico
- Servicios Médicos, UPR-Río Piedras, San Juan, Puerto Rico
- Edificio Vaquería Experimental, UPR-Estacion Experimental Agícola, Gurabo, Puerto Rico
- Casa Fullana, San Juan, Puerto Rico
- Iglesia San Martín de Porres, Cataño, Puerto Rico, listed on the U.S. National Register of Historic Places
- Iglesia San Ignacio, San Juan, Puerto Rico
- Hotel La Rada, San Juan, Puerto Rico
- UPRM General Library, Mayagüez, Puerto Rico
- Rafael A. Mangual Coliseum, Mayagüez, Puerto Rico
- Casa Klumb, San Juan, Puerto Rico, listed on the U.S. National Register of Historic Places
- Francis E. and Clara M. Perkins House, 9411 St. Andrews Way, Silver Spring, Maryland, 1940
- Casa Foreman, Adjuntas, Puerto Rico

== Accolades ==
In 1981, the Colegio de Arquitectos de Puerto Rico (Puerto Rico College of Architects) established the Henry Klumb Award, the College's highest honor (and Puerto Rico's main architecture prize). The list of recipients for the Henry Klumb Award includes architects Jesús Eduardo Amaral, Segundo Cardona, Jorge Rigau, and Andrés Mignucci.

The Architecture and Construction Archives at the University of Puerto Rico (AACUPR) holds the Henry Klumb Collection (1926–1984). Approximately 365 cubic feet (10,300 L) in size, the collection contains architectural drawings, photographs, models, artifacts, audiovisual material, and various textual documents. The Architectural Drawing Series holds 578 projects intellectually organized in two sub-groups: work in the United States and in Puerto Rico before 1945 and documents from The Office of Henry Klumb. The University of Puerto Rico acquired the Klumb archives in 1986, following the architect's death in 1984, and then they were transferred to the School of Architecture.

== See also ==
- List of Puerto Ricans - Architects
- German immigration to Puerto Rico

== See also ==
- Architecture of Puerto Rico
- Frank Lloyd Wright
