= Seaquarium Beach =

Public beach in Curaçao

- Beach
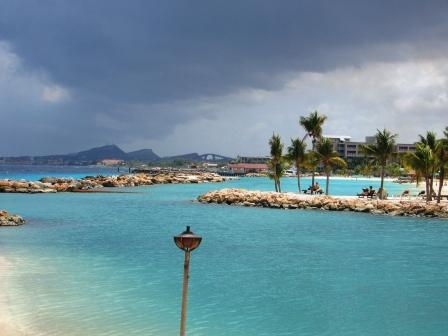
- Seaquarium Beach, June 2005

- Location in Curaçao
- Coordinates: 12°05′10″N 68°53′55″W
- Location: Willemstad, Curaçao

Seaquarium Beach (also called Sea Aquarium Beach) is a beach on the Caribbean island of Curaçao, located to the south of Willemstad. The beach is named after Curaçao Sea Aquarium, located nearby. The beach is open to the public, but an access fee must be paid. There are several bars, clubs and restaurants.

Radio station Dolfijn FM is located on Seaquarium Beach.
