= Piscadera Bay =

Piscadera Bay Piscaderabaai
- Neighbourhood / Bay
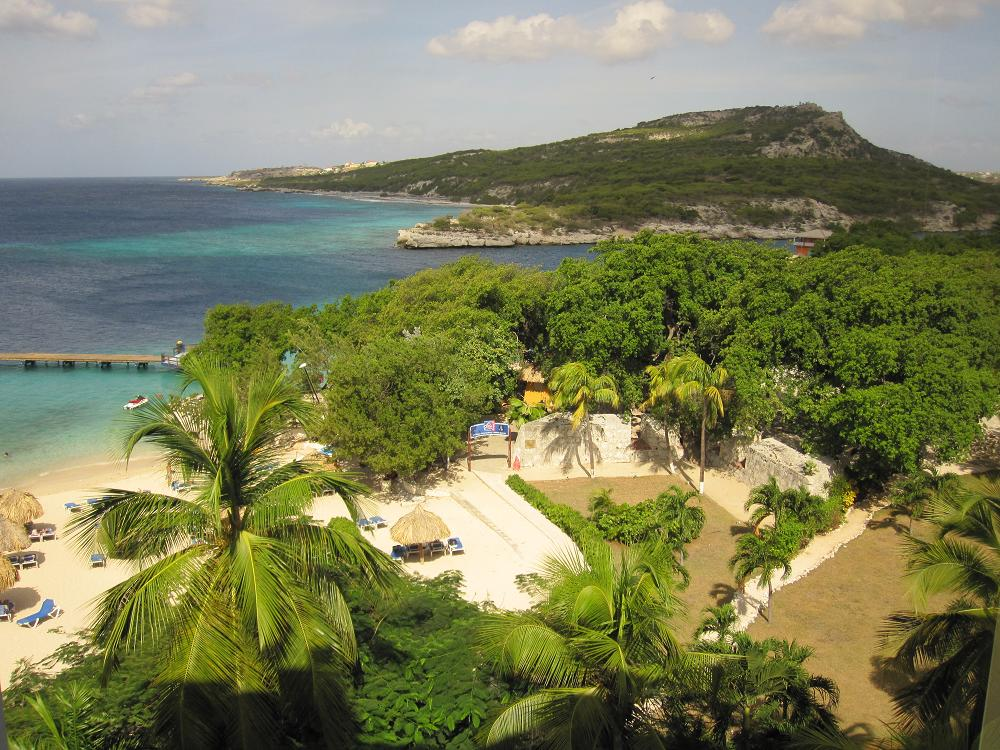
- Piscadera Bay and fort

- Location in Curaçao
- Coordinates: 12.1249°N 68.9668°W
- State: Kingdom of the Netherlands
- Country: Curaçao
- City: Willemstad

Area
  - Total: 3.62 km^{2} (1.40 sq mi)

Population (2011)
  - Total: 787
  - Density: 217/km^{2} (563/sq mi)

Piscadera Bay (Dutch: Piscaderabaai) is a waterway and a neighbourhood in the Netherlands Antilles. It is situated at the western side of Otrobanda, in the southern part of Willemstad, the capital of the southern Caribbean island of Curaçao. It contains a fort of the same name, the Caribbean Marine Biological Institute, and several hotels. It has a small beach, as well as a vacation village and holiday resort, with tennis courts and casinos. Sint Anna Bay is nearby. In the 17th century, maps of Piscadera Bay showed it to be a popular locale for fishing, with over 400 different species noted.

== History ==
Three hills (Veerisberg, Evertzberg and the Seru Pretu) dominate the landscape around the bay. In the late 17th century, plantation Veeris owned by Anton Veeris was established around the bay. The plantations Raphaël and Klein Piscadera followed later. Fort Piscadera was constructed in the 1700s, and rebuilt in 1744. After the abolition of slavery in 1863, a village developed based on agriculture and fishery. In November 1930, the village was annexed by Willemstad. In the 1930s, employees of Royal Dutch Shell settled in the village as well as Lebanese businessmen. From the 1960s onwards, luxury holiday resorts developed along the coast.

== Landmarks ==
=== Fort Piscadera ===
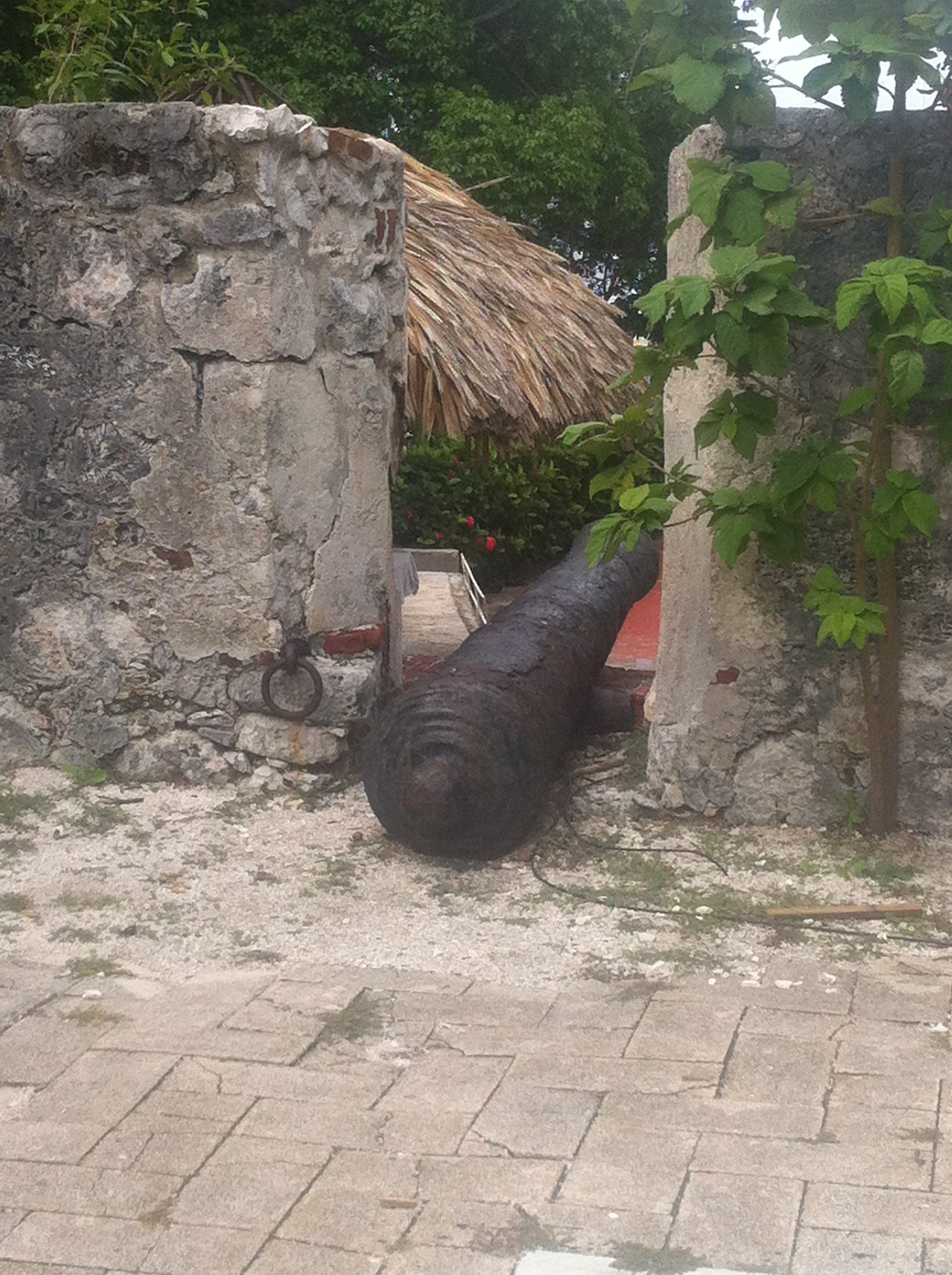
Canon in Fort Piscadera

In order to provide protection to Piscadera Bay, a fort was constructed on the cliffs overlooking the bay in 1700s, however it fell into neglect. The fort was restructured in 1744. It was seized by the British army in 1804 for a week in order to bombard Willemstad. This attack was unsuccessful and the invading troops were forced to leave the fort. By the 1950s, it had disappeared in the vegetation, and it was decided to restore the fort. The fort is in a dilapidated state in the precincts of the Curaçao Resort.

=== Research ===
In 1955, the head of the Petroleum Industry in Curaçao proposed funding for setting up of a scientific institution on the Piscadera Bay as it was found to be a perfect location for research, and then plans were prepared to establish the institution. The research station, known as the Caribbean Marine Biological Institute (CARMABI) was soon established at the open end of the bay to conduct research in the field of ecology—fisheries in particular. Renamed Caribbean Research and Management of Biodiversity Foundation after a merger with National Parks Foundation of the Netherlands Antilles (STINAPA), but still referred to as CARMABI, or CARMABI Foundation, it is "the largest field station in the Southern Caribbean".

=== Commercial ===
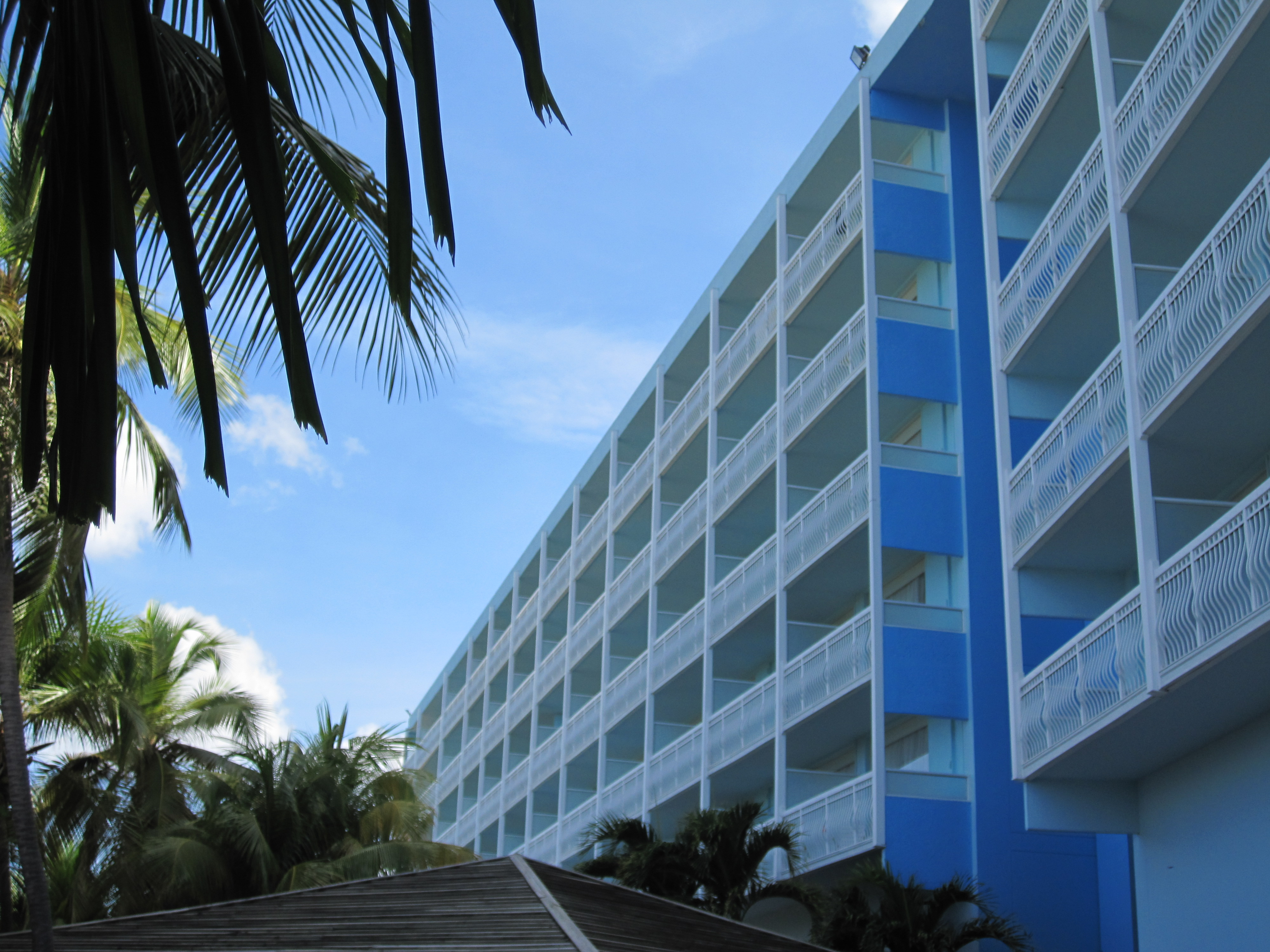
The Hilton Hotel at Piscadera Bay

One of the notable hotels overlooking Piscadera Bay is the Floris Suite Hotel. It contains 72 suites, each with their own patio. The hotel's open-air restaurant, Sjalotte, serves Mediterranean cuisine. The Hilton Curaçao Resort, set in 25 acres (10 ha) gardens, contains 197 rooms and a 5,000 square feet (460 m^{2}) Las Vegas-style casino, with three restaurants, its own brewery, and a dive centre. The luxury five-star four-diamond Marriott Beach Resort and Emerald Casino contains 237 rooms and 10 suites, and like the Hilton contains a casino to attract American tourists. The Marriott also has a dive centre and a water bar serving drinks. Other seaside landmarks are a convention and trade center, as well as the recreational area of Koredor.

== Bibliography ==
- Caribbean Commission (1955). The Caribbean, Volumes 9–10. University of Texas.
- Haviser, Jay B. (1987). Amerindian Cultural Geography on Curaçao. Foundation for Scientific Research in Surinam and the Netherlands Antilles.
- General Biological Supply House (1958). Turtox News, Volumes 36–38. Macmillan Science Company.
- Neumann, Alfred (1986). The Caribbean: The Lesser Antilles. Nelles. ISBN 978-3-88618-112-4.
- Piscaderabaai (2011). "Buurtprofiel Piscaderabaai" (PDF). Government of Curaçao (in Dutch).
- Philpott, Don (2002). Dutch Antillies: Aruba, Bonaire, Curacao. Landmark. ISBN 978-1-901522-04-4.
- Showker, Kay (1 March 2006). Eastern and Southern Regions: A Guide for Today's Cruise Passengers. Globe Pequot Press. ISBN 978-0-7627-3885-4.
- Sullivan, Lynne (1 December 2007). Pocket Adventures Aruba, Bonaire and Curacao. Hunter Publishing, Inc. ISBN 978-1-58843-647-4.
- Venrooij, Nancy van (2007). Floris Suite Hotel, Piscadera Bay, Curacao (in Dutch). NHTV internationale hogeschool Breda.
- Zaneveld, J. S. (1958). The Caribbean Marine Biological Institute, Piscadera Bay, Curacao (Neth. Antilles).
