= 1998 Puerto Rican general strike =

Strike to protest government privatization

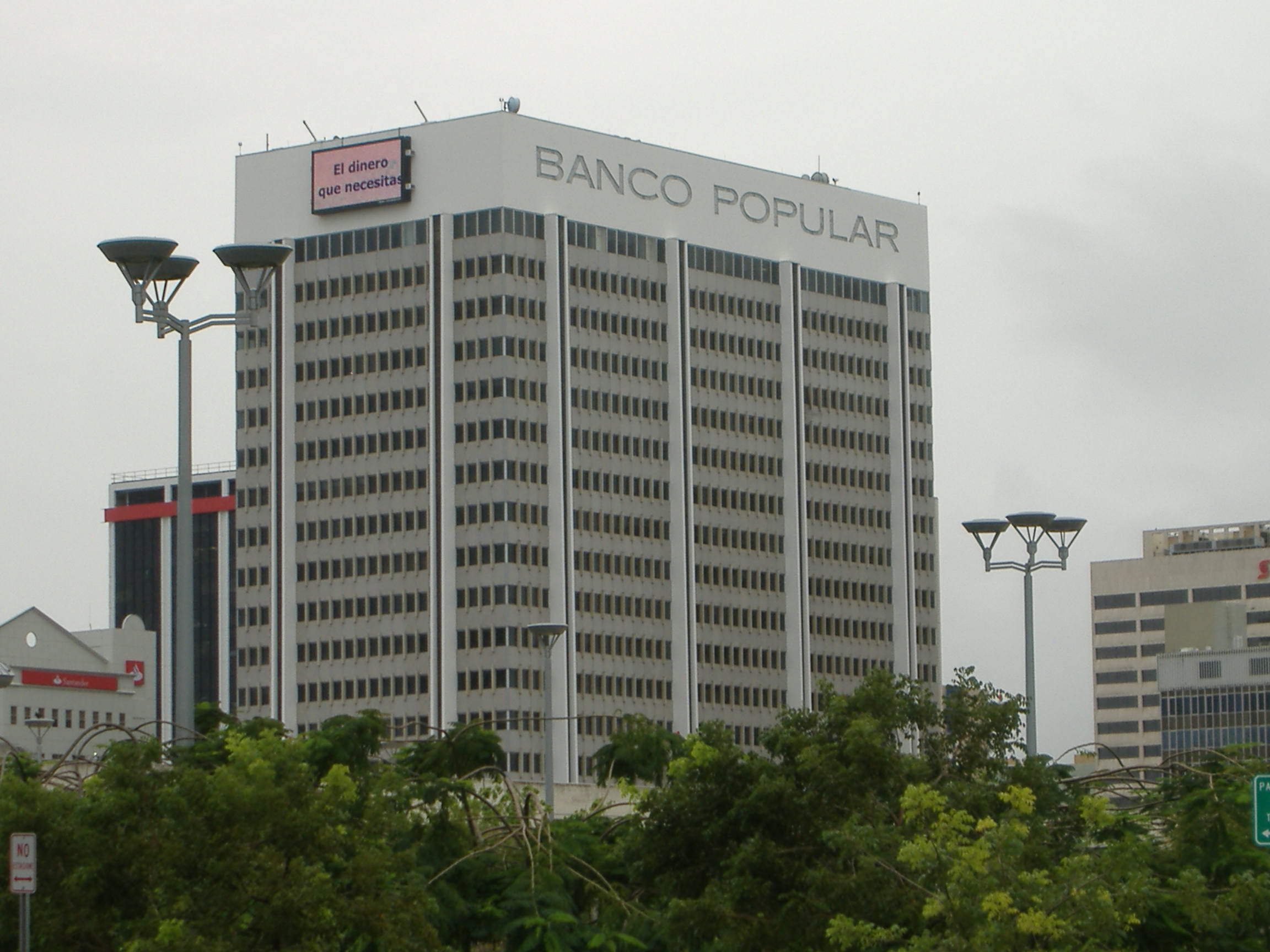
The headquarters of Banco Popular, a partner of the GTE-led consortium which purchased the Puerto Rico Telephone Company

The Puerto Rican general strike of 1998 began as a strike of Puerto Rico Telephone Company workers to protest a government privatization plan. Three weeks later, an estimated 500,000 people joined a two-day general strike, bringing commerce and travel in Puerto Rico to a standstill. Protests and pickets were mostly peaceful, but in the week before the general strike some infrastructure elements were sabotaged, and two bombs were detonated. The strike failed to stop the privatization plan, and in July a consortium led by GTE bought the PRTC for US$1.9 billion.

== Background ==
At the start of the 20th century, brothers Hernan and Sosthenes Behn founded the Puerto Rico Telephone Company, before moving to New York and incorporating International Telephone and Telegraph (ITT) in 1920. ITT ran the PRTC for many years, coordinating telephone service on the island with the government's Interior Department. In the 1940s, the Puerto Rican government enacted a series of laws designed to make telephone access more available in the eastern part of the island and allowed the state to play more of a role in providing service. By the end of 1959, the island had 76,000 phone lines.

Service under the ITT/ID partnership expanded rapidly across the island, but tended to favor wealthier urban areas, while residents of outlying areas experienced long waiting periods and lack of access. ITT often imported outdated equipment from Latin America for use within the PRTC, and the company's salary practices produced criticism: some non-Puerto Ricans were paid almost four times as much as the highest-earning Puerto Rican executive. This was compounded by an October 1973 ruling by the Puerto Rico Public Service Commission, fining the PRTC US$219,000.

In 1974, Governor Rafael Hernández Colón oversaw the government purchase of PRTC from ITT for a price of US$168 million. The newly nationalized phone company sought to improve service and expand networks, beginning with a US$500 million modernization fund. By 1980, the island had 12.9 lines per 100 people, up from 8.3 in 1974. By the 1990s, the PRTC was donating US$100 million each year to the government and gave free service to Puerto Rico's public schools.

=== 1990 strike ===
In February 1990, Governor Hernández Colón – serving his third and final term – proposed the sale of the PRTC to Bell Atlantic (which merged with GTE in 2000 to create Verizon Communications). Hernández Colón suggested that proceeds from the sale would go toward public education and improved infrastructure. Labor unions in Puerto Rico opposed the sale, however, and on 28 March 3,800 telephone workers went on a one-day strike. On the same day, a march 150,000 Puerto Ricans proceeded to the capitol building in San Juan. This activity – in addition to a law requiring a $3 billion sale price and a ban on firings for 18 months – blocked the proposed sale.

=== Deregulation ===
When the US Congress passed the Telecommunications Act of 1996, Puerto Rico's telephone market – like many others in the US – was deregulated, causing an influx of competitors to what had previously been a PRTC monopoly. Once other companies began competing with the PRTC, its size and structure became a liability. Carmen Culpeper, the company's president, said it was "bound by too many government procedures and regulations that delayed decision-making in a competitive environment."

== Privatization proposal ==
When Pedro Rosselló became governor of Puerto Rico in 1993, he advocated a program of widespread privatization in a variety of fields. In 1995 the government sold its Puerto Rico Maritime Shipping company, and a number of local government-owned farms, hotels, and mills were also privatized in the early part of the decade. "The government should not be competing in areas where it is not effective", Rosselló said.

As plans for the sale of the PRTC began to crystallize, a twelve-hour general strike was held in October 1997. Over 100,000 people participated in the coalition action, one of the largest gatherings of Puerto Rican residents in history.

On 27 May 1998 Rosselló announced that the government had reached an agreement to sell a majority stake of the PRTC to the GTE consortium. Although the PRTC — which made a profit of US$130 million in 1996 – was providing "generally good" telephone service and using "modern equipment" (in the words of the conservative National Center for Policy Analysis), some considered it to be inefficient and ill-equipped for competition in the growing wireless market.

Others disagreed. Victor Garcia, minority leader of the Puerto Rican Independence Party, said the PRTC had "the most advanced telecommunications infrastructure in the Caribbean" and that "its markets are growing and its competitive position is good." Union leaders expressed concern about layoffs and undervaluing of the company. Jose Juan Hernandez, president of the Independent Telephone Workers Union, claimed that GTE was planning to fire several thousand workers, and that the government offered a "fire sale price, at least $3bn below its value".

Some Puerto Ricans saw the proposal as an attempt to gain favor with mainland US business interests, to promote Rosselló's declared goal of statehood for the commonwealth. The PRTC was seen as an organizational focus of nationalistic pride among many on the island. Representing a militant extreme, the Boricua Popular Army said, "This sale is nothing more than a declaration of war. Now they will know what war is."

== PRTC workers strike ==
On 19 June 1998, when the Senate of Puerto Rico approved the sale, 6,400 PRTC workers went on strike. The action was coordinated by the 2,000-member Independent Brotherhood of Telephone Workers and the 4,400-member Independent Telephone Workers Union. 1,400 management employees reported for work (some of them arriving by helicopter on the roof), and some employees crossed picket lines carrying food and pillows for an extended stay inside. Some small-scale confrontations were reported on the first day, with one arrest after a worker was accused of spraying police with a mace-like substance.

=== Violence and sabotage ===
Clashes between striking workers and police became more violent on 22 June when officers beat a group of strikers unconscious as members of the press watched. In the days after this incident, militant protesters carried out a wave of property destruction and sabotage. In the southern town of Santa Isabel, a bomb concealed in a flashlight exploded in the hands of a police officer, severing a finger and wounding his leg. Another bomb was later detonated outside a branch office of Banco Popular, which participated in the GTE deal.

Elsewhere at the end of June, telephone and optic fiber cables were cut, causing service losses to over 300,000 customers and half of the island's ATMs. A telephone switching box in Cayey and a telephone booth in Mayagüez were also set on fire.

As the workers' strike dragged on with no response from the government, a coalition called the Greater Committee of Labor Organizations (Comite Amplio de Organizaciones Sindicales, or CAOS) was formed with the goal of launching a general strike.

== New York Health Care Workers Union ==
Local 1199 NY

UIET representative Victor Rodriguez met on July 9 in New York with members of the health care workers union, Local 1199. The PRTC workers plan to take their objections to the privatization to the US Federal Communications Commission (FCC), which still must approve the sale. 1199 head Dennis Rivera said his union would provide legal support and lobbying to pressure the FCC. [ED-LP 7/10/98]

Many analysts feel that Rossello and the PNP are pushing for the PRTC privatization as part of their effort to have Puerto Rico join the US as a state. On June 29 Anibal Acevedo Vila—president of the Popular Democratic Party (PPD), which supports maintaining Puerto Rico's current "commonwealth" status—introduced aproposal in the Chamber of Representatives for a referendum on the PRTC sale; the PNP majority defeated the motion. [Article by Jose Fortuno for a-infos 7/2/98] The government has started a public relations campaign to counteract "negative images" in the US resulting from the general strike. The campaign, designed by the Hill & Knowlton agency, will run in July and August at a costof $500,000. [ED-LP 7/12/98] "In Puerto Rico, It Is Business as Usual," announced a full-page advertisement in the July 12 New York Times, sponsored by nine Puerto Rican companies and business associations. The general strike "had very little island-wide support and did not materially affect the island's robust economy," the ad read. "Estimates offered by one of the island's largest dailies [unnamed]...calculated the turnout at about 13,000." [NYT 7/12/98]

== General strike ==
On 7 and 8 July, over 500,000 people engaged in a general strike across the island. The strike – endorsed by over 50 unions – forced the closure of shopping malls, banks, hospitals, and government offices. 14,000 police officers – 95% of the force – was activated to maintain order. Commerce and tourist activity around Puerto Rico were halted as crowds of protesters marched in the streets.

Strike organizers called for a referendum on the sale, pointing to polls indicating a 65% disapproval rate. Governor Rosselló refused to speak with union officials or activists, and reportedly went on vacation during the general strike.

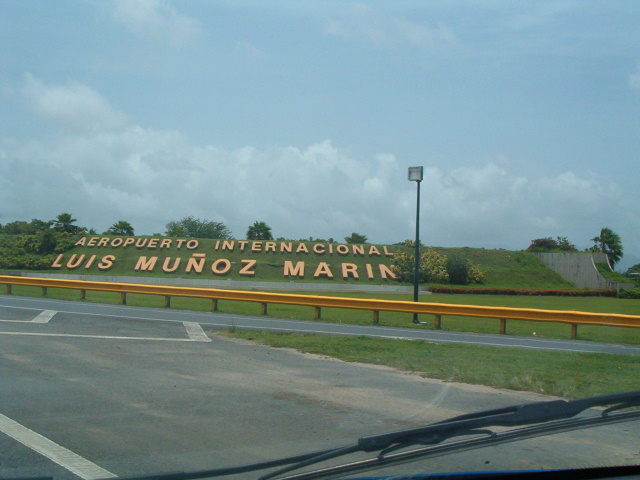
The entrance to the Luis Muñoz Marín International Airport

=== Travel disruptions ===
Traffic to the Luis Muñoz Marín International Airport was brought to a halt by the strike when activists erected barricades on the road leading to the terminal. This resulted in a tense five-hour standoff between 200 riot policemen and twice as many protesters, some of them armed with baseball bats and chains. The hours-long delay forced tourists to walk along the road for over a mile to reach the airport.

An agreement was eventually reached between protesters and police which allowed for the opening of two lanes of traffic. Still, movement was limited due to striking bus and taxi drivers. Two cruise ships also canceled stops in Puerto Rico because of the strike.

== End of strike ==
On 28 July, union telephone workers voted to end their 41-day strike, after receiving assurances that there would be no reprisals for striking workers. Given the popular support of the strike and the island's history with PRTC, some were puzzled by leaders' willingness to call off the protest. Writing in the Green journal Synthesis/Regeneration, Carmelo Ruiz asks: "What happened? The speed with which the national struggle against the PRTC's sale and governor Rossello's privatization policy fell apart points to an inside job. According to many activists, some spineless union leaders got cold feet in the heat of the fight and decided to back off. Others were more blunt: 'We were sold out.'"

== Sale and aftermath ==
When the Federal Communications Commission (FCC) approved the sale in 1999, the GTE consortium named Jon E. Slater as the new PRTC president and CEO. GTE announced plans to invest US$1 billion in the nation's telecommunications infrastructure, focusing on upgrades to the network and wireline growth.

While the strike-ending agreement forbade reprisals against workers, the president of the Government Development Bank, Marcos Rodriguez-Ema, admitted before the strike that the new PRTC owners would impose "voluntary layoffs, shifting of employees from subsidiaries to other companies, and early retirement".
