= Edsel Ford =

American businessman (1893–1943)

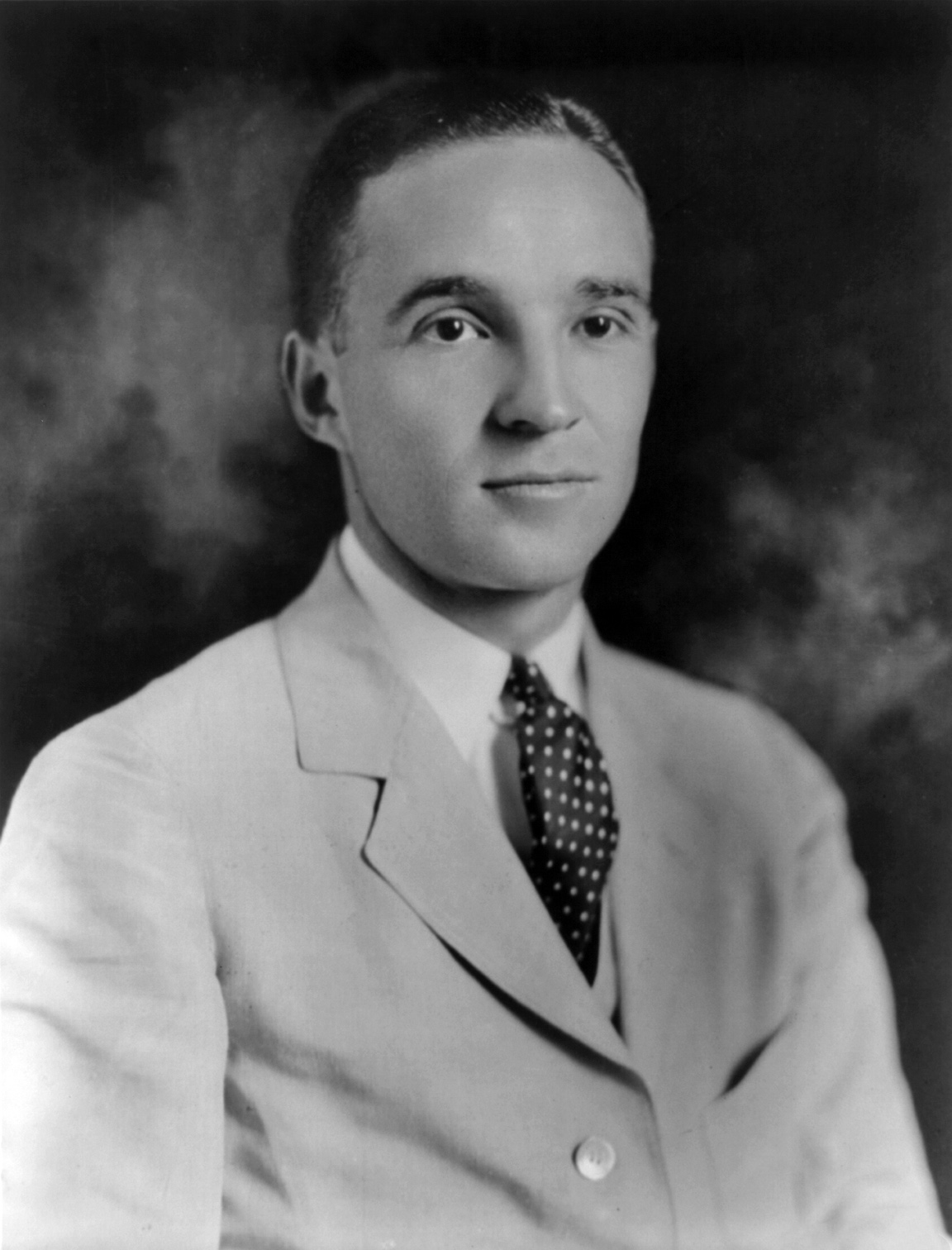
- Ford in 1921
- Born: Edsel Bryant Ford; November 6, 1893; Detroit, Michigan, U.S.
- Died: May 26, 1943 (aged 49); Grosse Pointe Shores, Michigan, U.S.
- Occupation: Automobile executive
- Title: President of the Ford Motor Company (1919–1943)
- Spouse: Eleanor Lowthian Clay (m. 1916)
- Children: Henry II; Benson; Josephine; William
- Parents: Henry Ford (father); Clara Jane Bryant (mother)
- Relatives: Edsel Ford II (grandson); William Clay Ford Jr. (grandson)
- Family: Ford

Edsel Bryant Ford (November 6, 1893 – May 26, 1943) was an American business executive and philanthropist, who was the only child of pioneering industrialist Henry Ford and his wife, Clara Jane Bryant Ford. He was the president of the Ford Motor Company from 1919 until his death in 1943.

He worked closely with his father, as sole heir to the business, but was keen to develop cars more exciting than the Model T ("Tin Lizzie"), in line with his personal tastes. Even as president, he had trouble persuading his father to allow any departure from this formula. Only a change in market conditions enabled him to develop the more fashionable Model A in 1927. Edsel also founded the Mercury division and was responsible for the Lincoln-Zephyr and Lincoln Continental. He introduced important features, such as hydraulic brakes, and greatly strengthened the company's overseas production.

Ford was a major art benefactor in Detroit and also financed Admiral Richard Byrd's polar explorations. He died of stomach cancer aged 49. Henry Ford temporarily reassumed the presidency of Ford Motor Company on Edsel's death, then Edsel's eldest son, Henry Ford II, succeeded Henry as president of the company in 1945.

He was also a member of the board of directors of American IG, the American subsidiary of the German chemical conglomerate IG Farben.

== Life and career ==
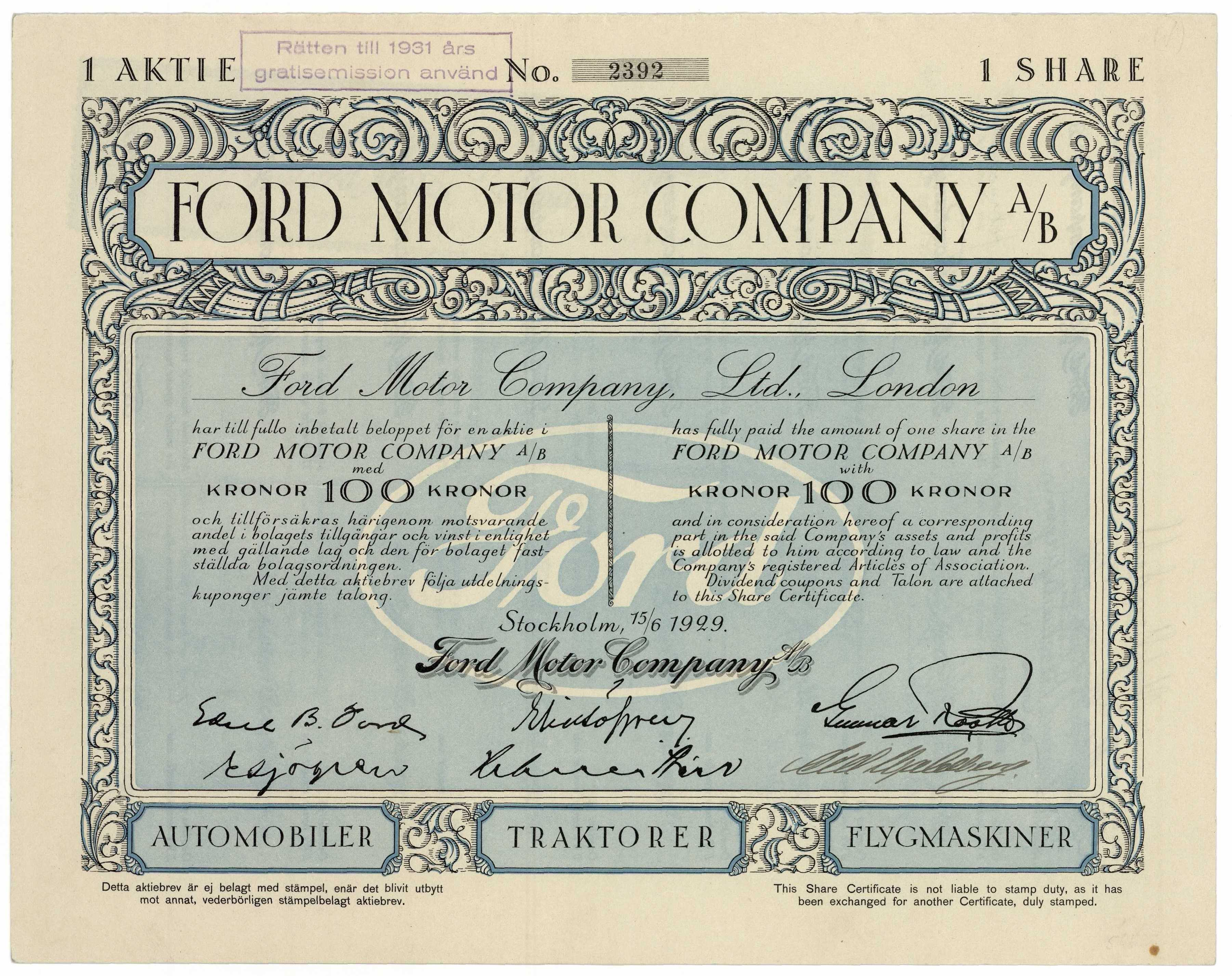
Share of the Swedish Ford subsidiary, issued 1929, signed by Edsel B. Ford

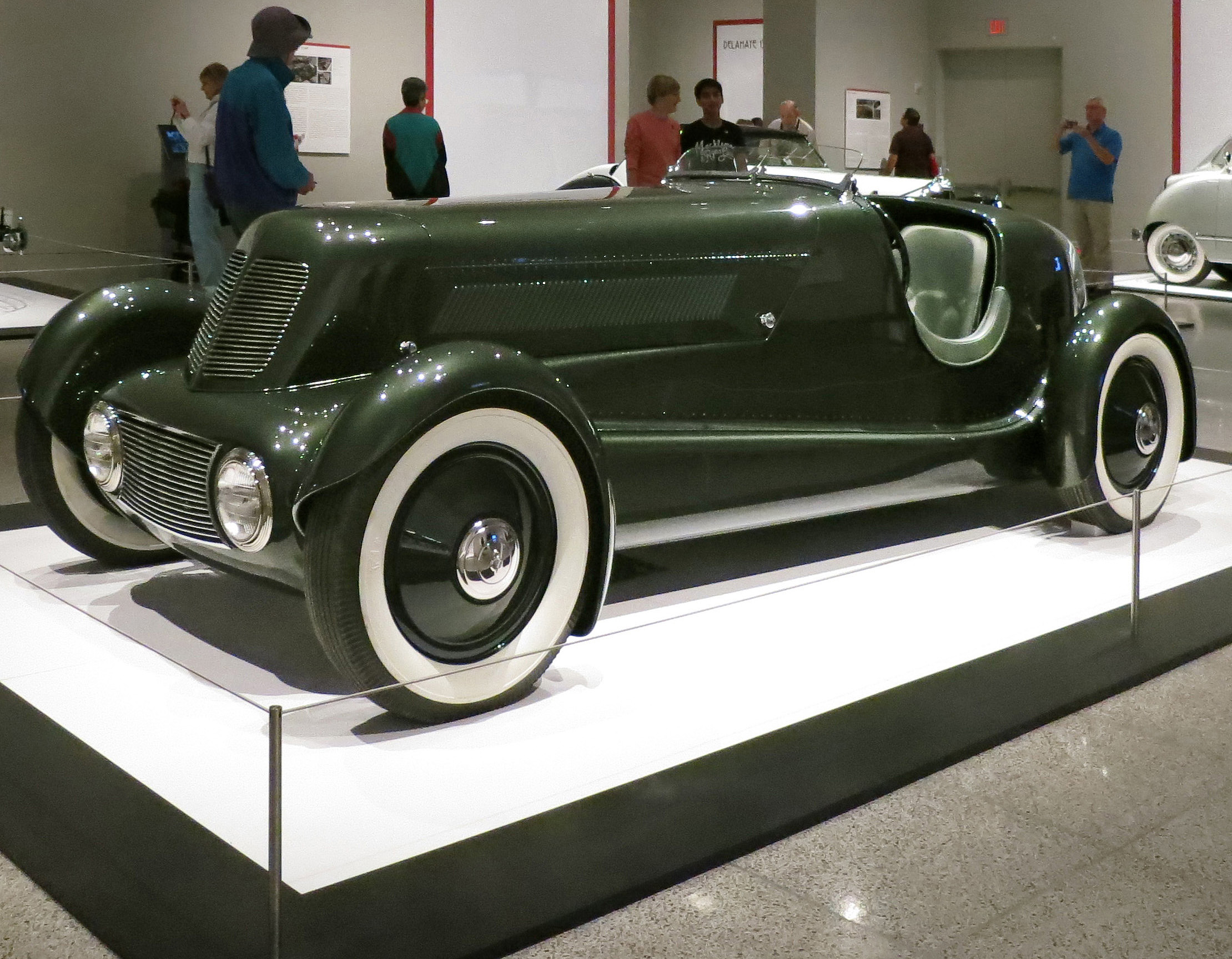
Edsel Ford's Model 40 Special Speedster

Edsel Ford was born in November 1893 in Detroit. He was the only child of Clara and Henry Ford, and was named after Edsel Ruddiman, one of Henry Ford's closest childhood friends.

He was groomed to take over the family automobile business, and grew up tinkering on cars with his father. He became secretary of Ford in 1915, and married Eleanor Lowthian Clay (1896–1976), the niece of department store owner J. L. Hudson, on November 1, 1916. Together, they had four children: Henry Ford II (1917–1987), Benson Ford (1919–1978), Josephine Clay Ford (1923–2005), and William Clay Ford (1925–2014). They made their home at 2171 Iroquois Street, in the Indian Village neighborhood of Detroit.

Ford went to the Hotchkiss School, in Lakeville, Connecticut, and the Detroit University School. His family donated to both institutions. The school library at Hotchkiss is named the Edsel Ford Memorial Library.

The younger Ford showed more interest than his father in flashier styling for automobiles. He indulged this proclivity in part with the purchase of the Lincoln Motor Company in 1922. His affinity for sports cars was demonstrated in his personal vehicles: Edsel bought the first MG motorcar imported to the US. In 1932, he had an aluminum, boat-tailed speedster automobile custom-designed by Ford's first designer, E.T. "Bob" Gregorie and featuring Ford's brand-new V8, the first low-cost, eight-cylinder engine. This car was sold at an auction during the Amelia Island Concours d'Elegance in 2016.

After becoming the president of Ford, he advocated for the introduction of a more modern automobile to replace the Model T, but was repeatedly overruled by his father. Dwindling market share finally made the introduction of a new model inevitable: the Model A.

During the design of the Model A in 1927, Henry Ford assured mechanical quality and reliability, allowing his son to develop the body, with the help of designer József Galamb. Edsel also prevailed upon his father to allow the inclusion of four-wheel mechanical brakes and a sliding-gear transmission on this model. The resulting Model A was a commercial success, selling almost five million during four years of production.

As president, Edsel often disagreed with his father on major decisions and was occasionally humiliated in public by his father. The relationship between the father and son was close, but fraught with unhealthy aspects. Edsel managed to introduce many lasting changes. He founded and named the Mercury division. He was responsible for the Lincoln-Zephyr and Continental. He significantly strengthened Ford Motors' overseas production, and modernized the company's cars, such as by introducing hydraulic brakes.

== World War II ==
As an early and enthusiastic advocate for aviation, Edsel insisted that the Ford company should develop airplanes, over the initial objections of his father, who could not envision commercial applications for planes. After having huge success as the US Post Office's airmail carrier, Edsel's foresight was rewarded. Because of his vision in this area, the company was able to respond to the critical need for airplanes during World War II.

=== Willow Run ===
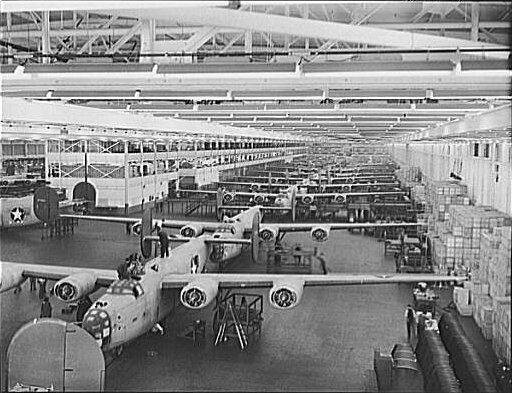
B-24 bombers under construction at Willow Run

The Ford Motor Company played a key role in the arming of the US "Arsenal of Democracy". With Edsel leading the company, he set the goal of producing one bomber per hour at Ford's expansive Willow Run manufacturing complex, where the B-24 was produced.

=== Nazi collaboration ===
According to Max Wallace in The American Axis: Ford, Lindbergh, and the Rise of the Third Reich, letters between Edsel and Maurice Dollfus, the head of Ford SAF, sent in 1942 indicate that Ford knew and approved of their French subsidiary's manufacturing efforts on behalf of the German military. Edsel was also present at a celebratory dinner at the Manhattan Waldorf Astoria organized by Gerhard Alois Westrick after the Fall of France. Other attendees included Sosthenes Behn of ITT, Torkild Rieber of Texaco, James D. Mooney of General Motors, and Philip Dakin Wagoner of the Underwood Typewriter Company.

== Death and legacy ==
Ford developed metastatic stomach cancer and undulant fever. Surgery for the cancer was unsuccessful due to the metastasis, and he died in 1943 at Gaukler Point, in his lakeside home in Grosse Pointe Shores, at the age of 49 from stomach cancer. All of his nonvoting stock was donated through a codicil in his will to the Ford Foundation, which he had founded with his father seven years earlier. He is buried at Woodlawn Cemetery in Detroit.

Each of Ford's children inherited sizable shares in the Ford Motor Company, and the three sons all worked in the family business. On Edsel's death, his father briefly reassumed the presidency of Ford; then Edsel's son, Henry Ford II, became president of the company on September 21, 1945.

Ford was one of the most significant art benefactors in Detroit history. As president of the Detroit Arts Commission, he commissioned the Diego Rivera Detroit Industry Murals in the Detroit Institute of Arts (DIA). He was an early collector of African art and his contributions became part of the core of the original DIA African art collection. After his death, his family continued to make significant contributions.

He helped finance exploratory expeditions, including the historic flight of Admiral Richard Byrd over the North Pole in 1926. Byrd, in his Antarctic expeditions, also financed by Edsel, named the Edsel Ford Range of mountains after him. Other Antarctic homages include Ford Massif, Ford Nunataks, and Ford Peak.

Interstate 94 in the Detroit Metropolitan Area is named the Edsel Ford Freeway.

In September 1957, Ford Motor Company unveiled a new division of cars called Edsel. The Edsel division included the Citation, Corsair, Pacer, Ranger, Bermuda, Villager, and Roundup models. The Edsel division is remembered as a significant commercial failure. The cars sold moderately well in their first year, but the Edsel division was discontinued soon after the 1960 models were introduced.

== Edsel and Eleanor Ford House ==
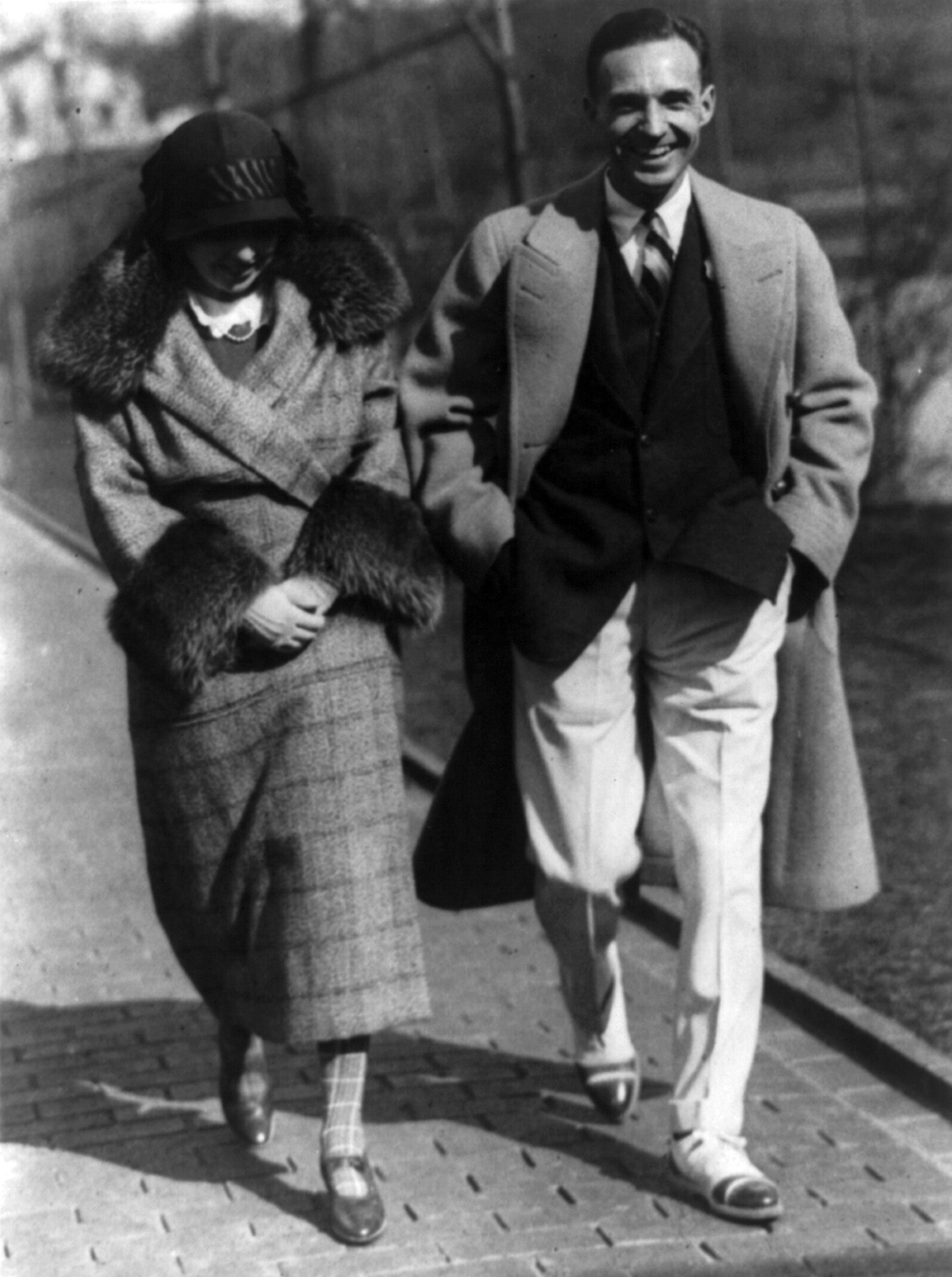
Edsel and Eleanor Ford, 1924

In September 1928 the Ford family moved into Gaukler Point, their new home designed by Albert Kahn, on the shores of Lake St. Clair in Grosse Pointe Shores, Michigan. The estate's landscape and gardens were designed by landscape architect Jens Jensen with his traditional long view, giving visitors a glimpse of the residence down the long meadow before revealing the entire house at drive's end.

He also designed the gardens for Edsel and Eleanor's summer estate Skylands in Seal Harbor on Mount Desert Island in Maine. Jensen designed work for their other Michigan residence, Haven Hill, between 1922 and 1935. Haven Hill, now within the Highland Recreation Area near White Lake Township in southeastern Michigan, is designated as both a Michigan State Historical Landmark and State Natural Preserve. Jensen's landscape elements, with the diversity of tree, plant, and animal life, combine aesthetics, history, and nature.

Ford died at Gaukler Point in 1943. His wife Eleanor continued living there until her death in 1976. It was her wish that the property be used for "the benefit of the public." The Edsel and Eleanor Ford House is now open to the public. Located on 87 acres (35.2 ha), the house has an excellent collection of the Fords' original antiques and art, and the historical landscape grounds on the lakefront. The museum currently hosts tours, classes, lectures, and special events. The property is listed on the National Register of Historic Places.

== See also ==
- Ford family (Michigan)
- Edsel and Eleanor Ford House

Business positions
Preceded by Henry Ford	President of Ford Motor Company; July 11, 1919 – May 26, 1943	Succeeded by Henry Ford
