= James D. Mooney =

American businessman (1884–1957)

- Born: James David Mooney; 18 February 1884; Cleveland, Ohio, U.S.
- Died: 21 September 1957 (aged 73); Tucson, Arizona, U.S.
- Occupations: Engineer, corporate executive
- Known for: General Motors Overseas operations

James David Mooney (18 February 1884 – 21 September 1957) was an American engineer and corporate executive at General Motors who played a role in international affairs in the 1930s and early 1940s.

== Biography ==
=== Early years ===
Born in Cleveland, Ohio, Mooney started classes in 1904 at the Case School of Applied Sciences, majoring in mining engineering, but did not graduate in the traditional 4-year period.

Instead, he went on gold mining expeditions in Mexico and California. From 1910 to 1917 Mooney worked at Westinghouse Electric, B. F. Goodrich and the Hyatt Roller Bearing Company, which later became part of General Motors. He steadily rose in the management ranks.

In 1917, he enlisted in the army and served in France as a captain with the 309th Ammunition Regiment, 159th Field Artillery.

Mooney did eventually receive his degree of Mechanical Engineer from the Case School of Applied Sciences in 1929 and his B.S. was conferred by NYU in 1927. He even received an Honorary Doctor of Engineering from Case in 1935, according to Case Western Reserve University's archives.

=== General Motors executive ===
After the war Mooney was appointed president and General Manager of Delco Remy, a General Motors subsidiary. In 1922, Mooney was made President of General Motors Overseas, responsible for operations around the world.

He traveled widely, visiting his division's factories in many different countries. Mooney was an early leader in managerial theory, recording his theories and real-life experiences in the widely read Onward Industry (1931), reissued in a revised edition as The Principles of Organization. He succeeded in applying American approaches to a great range of conditions in other countries.

=== Informal diplomacy ===
Mooney met leading government officials and other members of the elite in the countries he visited, discussing local and global economic issues. He was awarded the German Order of Merit of the Eagle in 1938. In May 1939, he met Nazi officials in Germany and discussed various issues concerning GM's Adam-Opel facility.

He arranged for a meeting in London between Helmuth Wohlthat, who was working for Hermann Göring on the Four Year Plan for the German economy, and ambassador Joseph Kennedy. The purpose was to discuss possible loans in exchange for more open trade conditions. In December 1939 and January 1940 he met with President Franklin D. Roosevelt and obtained authority for informal discussions with the Germans to better understand their goals. In March 1940, Mooney met first with Adolf Hitler and then with Göring. He presented Roosevelt's views to both men, and recorded their replies.

The German lawyer and businessman Gerhardt Alois Westrick visited the United States between March and August 1940. According to Charles Higham in his book Trading with the Enemy, Sosthenes Behn of ITT arranged the trip and persuaded Torkild Rieber, CEO of Texaco, to look after Westrick's local needs. Westrick represented many American companies in Germany including ITT, Ford, General Motors, Standard Oil, the Texas Company, Sterling Products, and the Davis Oil Company. On 26 June 1940, one day after the surrender of France, Rieber sponsored a celebratory dinner for Westrick at the Waldorf Astoria New York. Attendees included James D. Mooney, Sosthenes Behn of ITT, Edsel Ford of Ford Motor Company, and Philip Dakin Wagoner of Underwood.

Hostile accounts of the dinner were published by the Chicago Daily News, Time, Life, and the New York Herald Tribune. Early in August 1940, the recently founded PM Magazine published a series of articles that attacked Mooney for his contacts with the Nazis. The magazine accused him of pro-German views and criticized a speech he had made, later printed as an article in the Saturday Evening Post, entitled "War or Peace in America?"

=== Later career ===
In 1940, Mooney resigned from his position as President of General Motors Overseas to head a small team of directors charged with gearing up GM for wartime production. Mooney worked in the Production Engineering Section of the Bureau of Aeronautics.

George S. Messersmith, United States Ambassador Extraordinary and Plenipotentiary to Cuba, wrote a report on 4 March 1941 that criticized Mooney's negative views of England. He considered that Mooney was "dangerous ... for the Duke and Duchess of Windsor to be associated with." The Windsors visited Mooney in Detroit in November 1941, the month before the Attack on Pearl Harbor.

Later Mooney joined the staff of the Chief of Naval Operations. Mooney returned to GM after the war, but in 1946 left to head up Willys-Overland Motors as chairman and President. James David Mooney died in Tucson, Arizona on 21 September 1957 at the age of 73.

== Selected publications ==
- Sloan, Clifford Alexander, and James David Mooney. Advertising the technical product. McGraw-Hill Book Company, 1920.
- Mooney, James David. The Science of Industrial Organization. Diss. Case School of Applied Science, 1929.
- Mooney, James David, and Alan Campbell Reiley. Onward industry!. (1931).
- Mooney, James D. The new capitalism. (1934).
- Mooney, James David. The principles of organization. New York, Harper, 1937; 1947.

James D. Mooney Papers:

- "The James D. Mooney Papers". Georgetown University. Archived from the original on October 20, 2013.
