= Philip Dakin Wagoner =

Chairman of the Underwood Typewriter Company
- In office 1945–1956

Personal details
- Born: July 24, 1876 Somerville, New Jersey, U.S.
- Died: November 25, 1962 (aged 86) Manhattan, New York City, U.S.
- Occupation: Businessperson

Philip Dakin Wagoner (July 24, 1876 – November 25, 1962) was an American businessman who became chairman of the Underwood Typewriter Company.

== Early career ==
Philip Dakin Wagoner was born on 24 July 1876 in Somerville, New Jersey, son of Henry G. Wagoner and Rachel Line Dakin Wagoner. He graduated with a degree in mechanical engineering from the Stevens Institute of Technology in Hoboken, New Jersey, in 1896. His thesis was typewritten, which was very unusual at the time. His first job was with General Electric (GE). By 1910 he had become president of General Vehicle Company, a GE subsidiary. During World War I (1914-1918) this company made airplane engines for Great Britain.

== President of Underwood ==
After the war Wagoner was appointed president of the Elliott-Fisher Company, parent of the Underwood Typewriter Company and the Sundstrand Corporation. Wagoner was quoted in a 1923 article in Forbes as saying, "In doing business the work of a corporation or an individual has no real permanency unless it is rendering a service to business or to humanity." In 1927 he reorganized the company into Underwood-Elliott-Fisher, which later became the Underwood Corporation. John Thomas Underwood was elected chairman and Wagoner president of Underwood Elliott-Fisher. Wagoner had a house built on a 65 acres (26 ha) property in the West Mountain District of Ridgefield, Connecticut, named "Oreneca". This was (and is) a large and pretentious 1932 Georgian Revival style stone building.

World War II broke out in September 1939 when Germany and the Soviet Union invaded Poland. The USA remained neutral. On 26 June 1940, one day after the surrender of France, Torkild Rieber of Texaco sponsored a celebratory dinner for Gerhardt Westrick at the Waldorf Astoria New York. Westrick represented many large U.S. companies in Germany, and was visiting New York to drum up support for the Nazi regime. Wagoner attended, as did Sosthenes Behn of ITT, James D. Mooney of General Motors and Edsel Ford of the Ford Motor Company. Westrick told the guests that Britain would be defeated in three months, and there would then be huge opportunities for trade between America and the German Empire. Later there was a press outcry against Westrick, and many of his business associates no longer wished to be associated with him.

== Later years ==
In 1945 Wagoner was elected chairman of the board of Underwood, and Leon C. Stowell was elected president. Wagoner remained chief executive. Wagoner was given an honorary degree of doctor of engineering by the Stevens Institute in 1949. He retired as chairman of the board of Underwood in 1956.

Philip Dakin Wagoner died on 25 November 1962 at the age of 86 in St. Luke's Hospital in Manhattan, New York City.
