= Timeline of strikes in 1998 =

Strikes in 1998

In 1998, a number of labour strikes, labour disputes, and other industrial actions occurred.

== Background ==
A labour strike is a work stoppage caused by the mass refusal of employees to work. This can include wildcat strikes, which are done without union authorisation, and slowdown strikes, where workers reduce their productivity while still carrying out minimal working duties. It is usually a response to employee grievances, such as low pay or poor working conditions. Strikes can also occur to demonstrate solidarity with workers in other workplaces or pressure governments to change policies.

== Timeline ==
=== Continuing strikes from 1997 ===
- 1990s Donbas miners' strikes
- 1997–98 Finnish firefighters' strike, 3-month strike by firefighters in Finland
- 1991 Frontier strike, over 6-years long strike by workers at the New Frontier Hotel and Casino, represented by the Culinary Workers Union, one of the longest strikes in American history.
- Liverpool dockers' dispute (1995–1998)

=== January ===
- 1998 Haitian judicial strike, strike by prosecutors and justices of the peace in Haiti over wages and working conditions.

=== February ===
- 1998 Helsinki transport strike, strike by public transport workers in Helsinki, Finland, against sub-contracting of public services.

=== March ===
- 1998 Djibouti prisoners' hunger strike, hunger strike by political prisoners in Djibouti for improved prison conditions.
- 1998 Maimonides Medical Center strike, 3-week strike by nurses at the Maimonides Medical Center in the United States.

=== April ===
- 1998 All Nippon Airways strike, by All Nippon Airways flight crews in Japan over wages.
- 1998 Danish general strike, general strike in Denmark organised by the Danish Confederation of Trade Unions for its "three sixes" programme of six weeks of paid vacation each year, a six-hour working day, and a 6% pay raise.
- 1998 Kia strike, by Kia autoworkers in South Korea.

=== May ===
- 1998 Delhi nurses' strike, strike by nurses in public hospitals in Delhi, India, over wages.
- 1998 Ionian Bank strike, 46-day strike by Ionian Bank workers in Greece against privatisation.
- 1998 Russian miners' strike, strike by coal miners in the Russian Federation after nonpayment of wages.

=== June ===
- 1998 Air France strike, 10-day strike by Air France pilots, ahead of the 1998 FIFA World Cup held in France.
- 1998 Disneyland Paris strike
- 1998 General Motors strike, 54-day strike by General Motors autoworkers in the United States, represented by the United Auto Workers, the longest General Motors strike in the United States since 1970.
- 1998 Philadelphia transit strike, 40-day strike by SEPTA workers in the United States.
- 1998 Philippine Airlines strikes
- 1998 Puerto Rican general strike, general strike in Puerto Rico against privatisation of the Puerto Rico Telephone Company.
- 1998 Swedish painters' strike, organised by the Swedish Painters' Union.

=== July ===
- 1998 Hyundai strike, strike by Hyundai autoworkers in South Korea.
- 1998 Italian dubbers' strike, strike by film dubbing workers in Italy.
- 1998 Miniwatt strike, in Barcelona, Catalonia.
- 1998–99 NBA lockout

=== August ===
- 1998 Northwest Airlines strike, 2-week strike by Northwest Airlines pilots in the United States over wages.
- 1998 Syracuse University strike, strike by services staff at Syracuse University, represented by the Service Employees International Union.

=== September ===
- 1998 Air Canada strike, strike by Air Canada pilots over wages.
- 1998 Australian waterfront dispute
- 1998 Russian nuclear power strike, strike by nuclear power plant workers in the Russian Federation over nonpayment of wages.
- 1998–99 Russian teachers' strikes, strikes by teachers in the Russian Federation over unpaid wages.

=== October ===
- 1998 French lycéen protests
- 1998 German internet strike

=== November ===
- 1998–99 ABC lockout, 11-week lockout of American Broadcasting Company technicians following a 1-day strike.
- 1998 European rail strike, 1-day joint strike by railway workers in six different European countries against rail privatisation.
- 1998 Roman taxi strike, 10-day strike by taxi drivers in Rome, Italy, against deregulation.

=== December ===
- 1998–99 Samsung strike, over a deal in which Samsung would transfer its auto division to Daewoo in exchange for Daewoo's electronics division.

== Commentary ==
According to Austrian Trade Union Federation statistics, there were no strikes in Austria in 1998, the third year in the 1990s without strikes. In the UK, the Office for National Statistics recorded 166 strikes in the UK in 1998, the lowest number since ONS records began in 1891.

In Norway, Statistics Norway recorded 36 strikes in 1998, with the third highest number of working days lost of all years in the 1990s.
