= Gerhard Alois Westrick =

German lawyer, businessman, and lobbyist (1889–1957)

- Born: 27 April 1889; Münster, German Empire
- Died: 10 June 1957 (aged 68); West Germany
- Occupations: Lawyer, businessman
- Known for: Representing U.S. companies in Germany in World War II

Gerhard Alois Westrick (27 April 1889 – 10 June 1957) was a German lawyer and businessman who represented several major American companies in Germany before World War II. He was known for his efforts during a trip to New York in 1940 to gain support for the Nazi government. Later he turned against the regime.

== Early years ==
Westrick was born in 1889. During World War I (1914–1918), he was badly wounded and lost part of one leg. He joined the law firm of Heinrich Friedrich Albert in 1921 and became a specialist in international corporate law. Albert advised or represented major industrial and financial organizations in Germany and the United States. They were associated with Allen Dulles and his New York law firm Sullivan & Cromwell. The German law firm's clients included Kodak, Ford, Texas Oil, General Motors and ITT.

In 1938, Westrick founded his own law firm in Berlin, taking some of the American clients with him, including ITT.

Westrick was appointed chairman of ITT's German subsidiary. He played a leading role in helping ITT acquire companies in Eastern Europe.

== Intelligence work ==
In 1936, Westrick was called up to serve in the officer reserve but was rejected because of his injury. He still wanted to serve Germany and said that he was interested in intelligence work.

On the advice of Joachim von Ribbentrop, the French-American businessman Charles Bedaux met Westrick in August 1939 and hired him as his lawyer.

Westrick quickly managed to remove the obstacles that had been preventing Bedaux from operating in Germany. Westrick recognized Bedaux's potential as a source for intelligence and brought him to the attention of Leopold Bürkner, the head of the foreign liaison section of the Abwehr. Westrick's correspondence with the intelligence organization emphasized his own importance as chairman of ITT in Germany, such as in influencing what the Hungarian ITT plant would ship to Turkey, a key supplier of chromium to Germany.

World War II broke out in September 1939. Two days after Germany invaded Poland, France and Britain declared war. France fell in June 1940. The Soviet Union supported Germany in their invasion for Poland, however in June 1941 Germany invaded the Soviet Union. The US remained technically neutral until four days after the attack on Pearl Harbor; on December 11, 1941, Germany and Italy declared war on the United States.

Westrick was well-connected with the Nazi regime. His brother Ludger Westrick was head of the aluminum industry in Germany under Hermann Göring, and his brother Julius was on the staff of Otto Abetz, who became German ambassador to France after the occupation of that country.

In January 1940 Westrick was given the title of Wehrwirtschaftsführer for his contributions to the war effort. He was assigned by von Ribbentrop to undertake a mission to the United States to meet American business leaders and gain their support for Germany. He was also asked to look into obtaining a $5 billion loan for Germany after the war had ended.

== United States visit ==
Westrick left Berlin in January 1940. He was accompanied by his wife and his two sons: Klaus, 9, and Peter, 6. They traveled to the United States via the Soviet Union and Japan, then both neutral, and reached the United States on March 7, 1940. Westrick later said he had gone to the United States on his own initiative and planned to stay there, and his bringing his family lends some support to that assertion. However, according to Charles Higham's book Trading with the Enemy, Sosthenes Behn of ITT arranged the trip and persuaded Torkild Rieber, CEO of Texaco, to look after Westrick's local needs. (Note: Torkild Rieber was to suffer for his support of Westrick. When the newspapers picked up the story about Westrick's visit, publicity about Rieber's pro-Nazi views began to threaten Texaco's sales. After a stormy meeting in August 1940 the Texaco board of directors forced Rieber to resign.) Rieber arranged for offices in New York, a house in Westchester County, New York, and a Buick. Westrick found support among American business leaders who were hostile to Bolshevism and to President Franklin D. Roosevelt and were interested in continuing to do business in Europe.

Westrick represented many American companies in Germany, including ITT, Ford, General Motors, Standard Oil, the Texas Company, Sterling Products, and the Davis Oil Company. Westrick seems to have expected a friendly reception. He gave press conferences and attended receptions and parties. He presented the view that after the war America, Germany and Japan would dominate the world economy.

On June 26, 1940, one day after the Fall of France, Rieber sponsored a celebratory dinner for Westrick at the Waldorf Astoria New York. Attendees included Sosthenes Behn of ITT, James D. Mooney of General Motors, (Note: Adolf Hitler had given Mooney the Golden Eagle award.) Edsel Ford of the Ford Motor Company and Philip Dakin Wagoner of Underwood.

Westrick told the guests that Britain would be defeated in three months, and there would then be huge opportunities for trade between America and Germany. (Note: With the fall of France, Britain with her colonies and imperial possessions stood alone against Hitler, who controlled most of Europe. Many in the United States expected Germany next to invade Britain. The mood in America quickly changed from noninterventionsm to preparation for war with Germany.)

The British BSC chief in North America, William Stephenson, found out about Westrick's mission and leaked it to the press. The story was picked up by the Chicago Daily News, Time, Life, and the New York Herald Tribune. On July 8, 1940, Time published a hostile story, calling Westrick "Hitler's ambassador-off-the-record to U.S. businessmen". The Herald Tribune ran stories with headlines like "Hitler's Agent Ensconced in Westchester" and gave his home address. Many of his business associates no longer wished to be associated with him. Westrick's house became a target for angry citizens. An FBI guard was placed around the property. Westrick had disappeared from view by the end of July.

The FBI found that Westrick had concealed his disability and obtained a driving license illegally, which was removed on August 1, 1940. Newspapers reported that the FBI had asked the police to record the license numbers of cars that stopped at Westrick's house in Scarsdale. On August 11, the New York Post said $5 million had been deposited for Westrick in a bank in San Francisco by a source in Germany, followed by additional sums. The paper said the Nazis thought that he was an ace propagandist. Columnists such as Walter Winchell and Drew Pearson attacked Westrick, wildly exaggerating his connections with the Nazis.

In the face of that storm of hostile publicity, German Chargé d'Affaires Hans Thomsen asked Westrick to return to Germany. Westrick left the United States on August 23, 1940, returning to Germany via the Pacific route.

== Later career ==
Back in Germany, Westrick continued to work for his American clients. Westrick had been given power of attorney over all the European ITT properties just before the fall of France to forestall the possibility of a German seizure. Germany declared war on the United States in December 1941 after the Japanese bombing of Pearl Harbor. In early 1942, Westrick flew to Madrid, where he met with Sosthenes Behn to discuss how to manage ITT's European business in the new political climate. Wilhelm Ohnesorge, the Reich Postal Minister, repeatedly tried to dissolve ITT on the grounds that it was an enemy-favored enterprise. Westrick did all that he could to prevent that, perhaps to protect his own interest in the company. Ohnesorge took his case to Hitler, calling Westrick an American sympathizer, but Hitler recognized the importance of ITT and let the company continue operating in Europe, with Westrick as chairman of the managing directors.

During the war, Westrick remained in touch with ITT's head office in America through G. Edouard Hofer, the managing director of ISE in Switzerland. The US State Department was aware of these communications and monitored them.

Westrick also continued his intelligence work. His last report giving information from Bedaux was written in March 1942 and reported on French Marshal Philippe Pétain and his intimates and their dealings with the French Legion in North Africa.

However, he became disillusioned with the Nazi regime. During interrogations after the war the head of foreign intelligence, Walter Schellenberg, said that Westrick was among the few people with whom he could discuss in 1943 the need to overthrow Hitler or even to kill him. Around the end of 1944, Westrick and two other business leaders suggested to Schellenberg that they could negotiate for him with Dulles in Switzerland. Schellenberg turned down the offer since he had nothing tangible to propose to Dulles.

The war in Europe ended in May 1945. Westrick was interrogated over his role in the regime in April 1947.

Behn would have no contact with Westrick after the war and refused to vouch for him during his trials. Westrick died in 1957. He was then about 68.

== Sources ==
- Berlin, Isaiah (June 4, 2004). Isaiah Berlin: Volume 1: Letters, 1928–1946. Cambridge University Press. ISBN 978-0-521-83368-4.
- Berlin, Isaiah (June 30, 2012). Enlightening: Letters 1946 – 1960. Random House. ISBN 978-1-4464-9608-4.
- Bloomenkranz, Sol (July 6, 2012). Charles Bedaux – Deciphering an Enigma. iUniverse. ISBN 978-1-4759-2637-8.
- Chomsky, Noam (November 10, 2010). The Chomsky Reader. Knopf Doubleday Publishing Group. p. 433. ISBN 978-0-307-77249-7.
- Cull, Nicholas John (1996). Selling War: The British Propaganda Campaign Against American Neutrality in World War II. Oxford University Press. ISBN 978-0-19-535479-9.
- Doerries, Reinhard R. (May 1, 2003). Hitler's Last Chief of Foreign Intelligence: Allied Interrogations of Walter Schellenberg. Taylor & Francis. ISBN 978-0-203-01809-5.
- Doerries, Reinhard R.; Weinberg, Gerhard L. (October 10, 2013). Hitler's Intelligence Chief: Walter Schellenberg: Walter Schellenberg. Enigma Books. ISBN 978-1-936274-13-0.
- Evans, Anthony A.; Gibbons, David (August 2011). The Illustrated Timeline of World War II. The Rosen Publishing Group. ISBN 978-1-4488-4795-2.
- Hammel, Eric (January 27, 2010). The Road to Big Week: The Struggle for Daylight Air Supremacy Over Western Europe. Pacifica Military History. ISBN 978-1-890988-29-6.
- Higham, Charles (1983). Trading with the Enemy: An Exposé of the Nazi-American Money Plot, 1933–1949. Delacorte Press. ISBN 978-0-385-29080-7.
- Jackson, Ashley (March 9, 2006). British Empire and 2ND Ww (E). Continuum. ISBN 978-0-8264-4049-5.
- Moss, Norman (2004). Nineteen Weeks: America, Britain, And The Fateful Summer Of 1940. Houghton Mifflin Harcourt. ISBN 978-0-618-49220-6.
- "Nazi Agent Received Funds From Germany". The Courier-Mail (Brisbane). August 12, 1940. p. 5.
- "Nazi Special Agent Afoul of N.Y.'s Law". The Montreal Gazette. August 2, 1940.
- "Oil: Exit Rieber". Time. August 26, 1940. Archived from the original on October 14, 2010.
- Sobel, Robert (2000). ITT: The Management of Opportunity. Beard Books. ISBN 978-1-893122-44-4. (See ITT: The Management of Opportunity)
- Stevenson, William (2000). A Man Called Intrepid: The Secret War. Lyons Press. ISBN 978-1-58574-154-0.
- "War Front: German Tempter". Time. July 8, 1940.
