= Dos Hermanos Bridge =

Bridge in San Juan, Puerto Rico

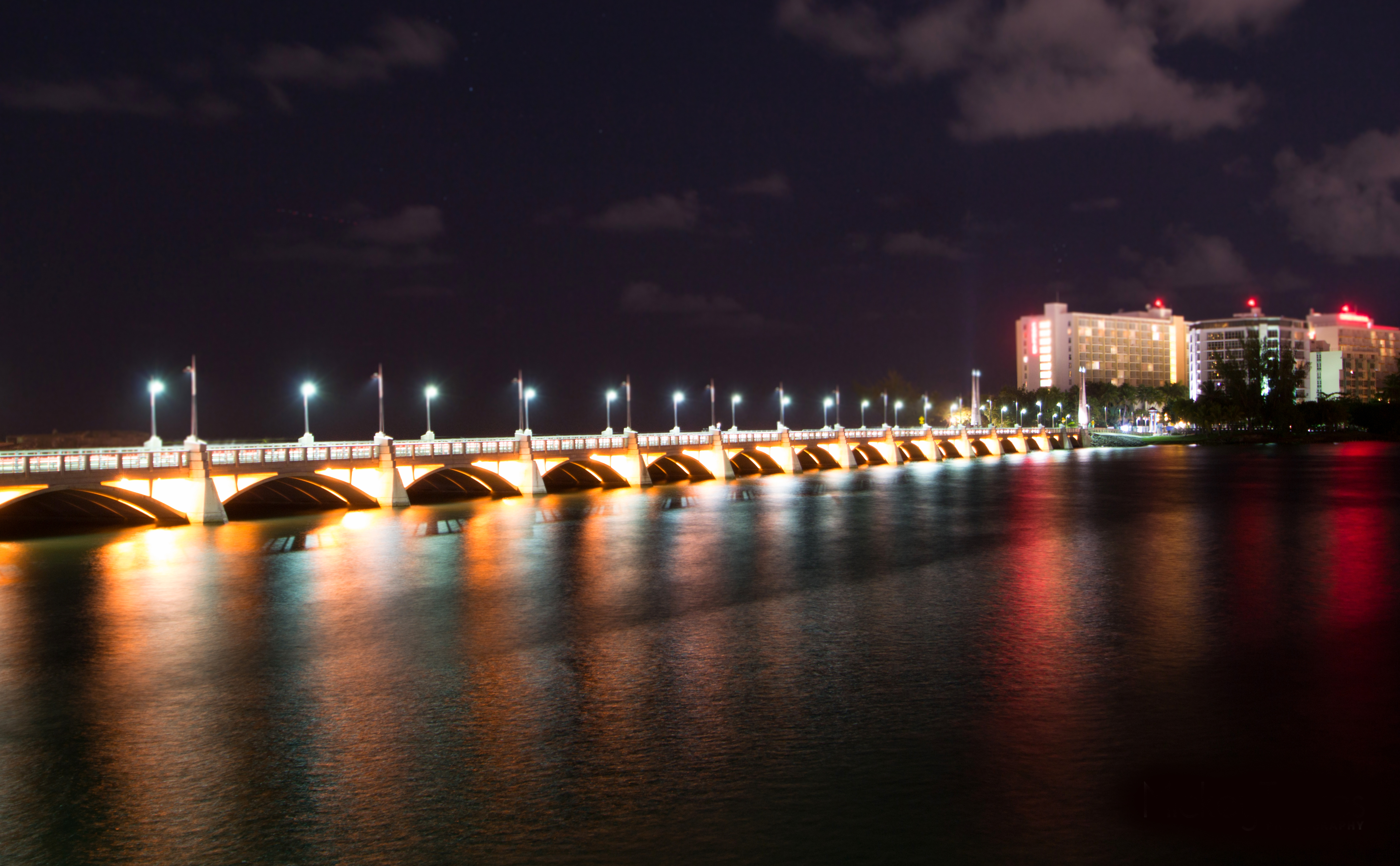
- The bridge at night in 2012
- Coordinates: 18°27′37″N 66°05′5″W
- Carries: 4 lanes
- Crosses: Condado Lagoon
- Locale: San Juan, Puerto Rico

Characteristics
- Total length: 308 metres (1,010 ft)

History
- Opened: May 22, 1910; 115 years ago

Location
- Interactive map of Dos Hermanos Bridge

The Dos Hermanos Bridge (Spanish: Puente Dos Hermanos) is a bridge in San Juan, the capital municipality of Puerto Rico. Crossing over the Condado Lagoon, it connects the district of Condado in the barrio of Santurce with the land entrance to San Juan Islet, which is where the historic quarter of Old San Juan is located. The bridge was designed and built by brothers Hernand and Sosthenes Behn, opening in May 22, 1910.

== Etymology ==
The bridge is named "Dos Hermanos", which translates to "Two Brothers", after the Behn brothers who built it during 1908–1910.

== History ==
The Behn brothers arrived at Puerto Rico in 1906 from St. Thomas, U.S. Virgin Islands. They were the founders of the Porto Rico Telephone Company, and decided to create a 150-acre real estate development in Santurce. This project became what is now known as Condado. To help with the process, the Behn Brothers built permanent bridges to facilitate the access, and people quickly started calling the main bridge "Dos Hermanos".

In 1999, a project of reconstruction and restoration of the bridge started. However, it had to be halted for not counting with the necessary permits. The project was restarted on July 4, 2011, and the new bridge was inaugurated in December 2011.
