= Barco oil concession =

Large oil concession in Colombia

- Location of Tibú, which became the main camp when the oilfield was developed
- Country: Colombia
- Region: Norte de Santander department
- Offshore/onshore: Onshore
- Coordinates: 8.639068°N 72.737099°W
- Operator: Texaco, Socony Vacuum, Ecopetrol

Field history
- Discovery: 1905
- Start of development: 1936
- Start of production: 1939

Production
- Peak of production (oil): 25,000 barrels per day (~1.2×10^{6} t/a)
- Estimated oil in place: 250 million barrels (~3.4×10^{7} t)

The Barco oil concession was one of the main concessions in Colombia during the early development of its petroleum industry, the other being the De Mares concession. Oil was first found in the Norte de Santander department near the border with Venezuela in 1905, but development did not start until 1936. A joint venture between the Texas Corporation and Socony-Vacuum (now Texaco and Mobil) sank the wells and built a 263-mile (423 km) pipeline across the mountains and through swampy jungle to the Caribbean coast at Coveñas. Workers were harassed by Motilone people defending their territory, and several died. The concession began operation in 1939 and continued into the 1960s, when it began to be depleted. Other fields in the region are still productive.

== Location ==
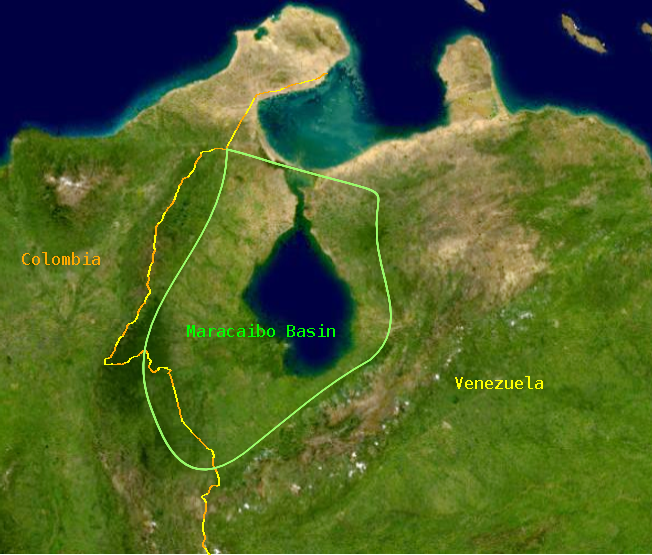
Maracaibo Basin. The Barco concession lies in the southwest portion within Colombia.

The oilfield lies in the Norte de Santander department, in the east of the country, in the Catatumbo River basin. The oilfield is part of the Maracaibo Basin, which spans Colombia and Venezuela. To the west it is bounded by the Santander Massif and the Sierra de Perija, parts of the Cordillera Oriental, a northern extension of the Andes. To the south and southeast, it is bounded by the Mérida Andes, and to the east, by the Venezuelan border. The Venezuelan part of the oilfield has produced several billion barrels of oil. By 2007 the different fields in the Catatumbo sub-basin had produced more than 800 million barrels of oil. The Barco concession is estimated to have held between 250 and 300 million barrels.

The Catatumbo River is 300 kilometres (190 mi) long, of which the first 100 km (62 mi) is in Colombia. About 63% of the river basin lies in Colombian territory. The Catatumbo provides 70% of Lake Maracaibo's fresh water. By the early 2000s the river had become highly polluted, with sewage and industrial waste dumped into the river in Colombia, and pesticides and chemical fertilizers washed into the river further down in Venezuela. Guerilla groups in Colombia had also blown up sections of the oil pipeline, and despite containment efforts, some of the spilled oil had also contaminated the river.

== History ==
=== Early years ===
Virgilio Barco Martinez (Note: Colonel Virgilio Barco was the grandfather of Virgilio Barco Vargas, president of Colombia from 1986 to 1990,) was granted the concession on 16 October 1905 in the Catatumbo region of the Norte de Santander department. Colonel Barco had led victorious forces in the recent Thousand Days civil war, and was given the concession in return. He planned to use it for cattle, until he found that oil was seeping out of the ground. World War I caused delays in developing the field. In 1918 Barco sold the concession to the Carib Syndicate, a concern owned by Americans, who sold 75% of their interest to the Colombian Petroleum Company the next year. This was a subsidiary of Edward L. Doheny's Pan American Petroleum and Transport Company. Doheny was also interested in plans to develop the oil industry in Venezuela, and in building a pipeline from Colombia to Venezuela to make it more economical to export the Barco oil.

The concession was transferred on April 15, 1918 to the Compania Colombiana del Petroleo. Edward L. Doheny was never involved in this. It was Henry Latham Doherty of Cities Service Co. which owned 75% of the Colombian Petroleum Co. (capitalized at $5 million and not necessarily identical to the Compania). The remainder was held by the Carib Syndicate, whose stock was making large gains in October 1919. Cities Service Co. owned the 74.51% interest in Colombian Petroleum Co. (and through it 200,000 shares in the Compania Colombiana) in April 1923 when McBeth claims Doheny was behind Lago Petroleum Co. Pan American Petroleum only came in contact with Lago Petroleum Corp. when a syndicate of Standard Oil of Indiana, Blair & Co and British-Mexican Petroleum acquired a controlling interest on April 1, 1925.

The Colombian Petroleum Company, now a subsidiary of Cities Service, failed to develop the concession and sold out to Gulf Oil in 1926. That year the government of Pedro Nel Ospina Vázquez revoked the concession. In early 1928 new petroleum regulations came into force that required proof of ownership from private concession holders. The United States Department of State interpreted these changes as a move to let British companies acquire oil concessions in Colombia. They had reason, since between 1926 and 1927 the Colombian government had been discussing the Barco Concession with H. Yates of the British Petroleum Company. The State Department sent John Stabler to Bogota to sort out the problem. His tactless criticism of Colombian policy stirred up public hostility. Stabler left the country in mid-1928, having achieved less than nothing.

Gulf Oil was still interested in getting its title reestablished, but the market was temporarily saturated so Gulf wanted to hold the concession in reserve, while Colombia wanted it developed. In 1930 the State Department facilitated discussions between the oil companies and newly elected Liberal president Enrique Olaya Herrera. An agreement was made in early 1931. Under the new arrangement, Gulf regained the concession on condition that it build a pipeline to the sea, and pay royalties on any oil delivered of 6% to the government and 3.5% to colonel Barco's successors. Gulf found oil but was not able to undertake construction. Torkild Rieber of the Texas Corporation, now Texaco, bought the concession in 1936 for $14,550,000. He sold a half interest to Socony-Vacuum, now Mobil. The combined area of the Texaco and Socony Vacuum concessions was 1,000,000 acres (400,000 ha).

=== Construction ===
Concession region and pipeline

The Colombian government would not allow the pipeline to take the easier route to Lake Maracaibo, since about 140 kilometres (87 mi) would pass through Venezuelan territory. Instead the crude oil had to be pumped over the Cordillera Oriental via the 1,000-metre (3,300 ft) Rieber Pass, named after Torkild Rieber. From there the line ran west through the Magdalena River valley, in three places running under the river or one of its tributaries. The 421-kilometre (262 mi) pipeline terminated at the Caribbean port of Coveñas in the Sucre department. It was designed to be able to carry 28,000 barrels per day from the La Petrólea and Tibú fields.

South American Gulf Oil, a subsidiary, built the pipeline. Charley Atwell was in charge of construction. Little was known of the difficult terrain through which the pipeline was to run. Most of the equipment and supplies were carried by air, a total of 5,000,000 kilograms (11,000,000 lb), landed on airstrips hacked out of the jungle. This included a suspension bridge 76 metres long (249 ft) as well as vehicles, power plants, plumbing and food. The welded pipe was wrapped in heavy paper, covered with hot asphalt and then buried. At its peak, 5,000 local workers were employed, supervised by 400 Americans. Eight employees of the oil companies were killed by Motilone people defending their territory.

The oil companies built a road to the concession through the rugged country, which they handed over to the government. 62 wells were operational when the pipeline was opened. The crude was gold-green in color and yielded 49% gasoline on straight-run refining, a very high value. The last weld in the 300 millimetres (12 in) pipe was made by Gladys Crosby Whitney, wife of Cornelius Vanderbilt Whitney. Total costs to develop the field and the pipeline were $40,000,000. The pipeline alone cost $18 million.

=== Operation ===
Oil started flowing on 15 October 1939, and at the start of November began to be pumped into Texaco and Socony Vacuum tankers at Covenas at a rate of 25,000 barrels a day. In July 1940 the oil was flowing at 11,000 barrels a day, at which rate the investment would be recovered within five years. In 1954 there were 2,000 oil workers in Tibú, including 110 Americans, and 200 in Río de Oro. 25,000 barrels per day were being pumped from 200 wells. The operating company was Colpet. Colpet airplanes flew a regular schedule from Cúcuta to company airstrips at the Covenas terminal and the Tibú and Río de Oro camps, with less frequent trips to Bogota and to Petrolia, once the main base. Conditions were tough. A 1954 article in Flying Magazine called the Motilone people "the world's most unfriendly citizens" and said they "have pin-cushioned more than 120 oilfield hands since 1936." Victims of Motilone arrows would be flown out for emergency treatment.

The concession passed back to the Colombian government in 1955. The government-owned Empresa Colombiana de Petróleos (Ecopetrol) took over control, but by the 1960s the concession's wells were depleted. However, oil continues to be extracted in the area. In 2007 PetroSouth Energy Corporation announced it had acquired a 6% working interest in the 64,000-acre (26,000 ha) Carbonera concession. The announcement described some of the oilfields in the region: "Immediately adjacent to the Carbonera Block lie fields such as Tibu, found in 1940 and with 260 million barrels produced to date, Petrolea, discovered in 1934 with 38 million barrels produced to date, and Rio Zulia, dating from 1962 and with 137 million barrels recovered to date."
