= Hernán Behn =

American-Puerto Rican businessman

Hernand Behn was born February 19, 1880, in Saint Thomas, Virgin Islands. He and his family became United States citizens in 1917, when the U.S. acquired the Virgin Islands from Denmark for $30 million. With his brother, he co-founded Puerto Rico Telephone Company, then ITT.

Educated in Corsica and Paris, he was of French, Danish, English and Dutch ancestry. He later became a lieutenant in the U.S. Navy Reserve. With his wife, Helen, he had four children, including a daughter, Elizabeth, and a son, who worked for ITT. Educated at Taft, Hernand Behn carried on his father's name at ITT. His mother and uncle were in attendance at his 1940 wedding at St. Patrick's Cathedral in New York City.

Behn and his brother, Sosthenes, built the Dos Hermanos Bridge (Spanish: Puente Dos Hermanos, English: Two Brothers Bridge), in San Juan. The bridge links the districts of Condado and Old San Juan.

With his brother, he co-founded ITT Inc. in 1920, leading the company as its first president, until 1933, having grown its assets to over $500 million. Sosthenes was a second vice-president, later becoming the company chairman, following Hernand's death in 1933, and growing ITT into an international conglomerate that was later split into three companies, in 1995.

He died October 7, 1933, of "alimentary disorders" in Saint-Jean-de-Luz, France.

== See also ==
- Telecommunications in Puerto Rico
