= International Bell Telephone Company =

Telephone service provider

The International Bell Telephone Company (IBTC) of Brussels, Belgium, was created in 1879 by the Bell Telephone Company of Boston, Massachusetts, a precursor entity to the American Telephone and Telegraph Company (AT&T), initially to sell imported telephones and switchboards in Continental Europe.

IBTC evolved into a notable European telephone service provider and manufacturer, with major operations in several countries.

As a result of anti-trust actions in the U.S., AT&T, its parent, sold its entire European division and IBTC's subsidiaries to the International Telephone & Telegraph Company in 1925, ending a 46-year presence on the continent.

== Organization ==
In 1879 Gardiner Hubbard, father-in-law of Alexander Graham Bell and the first president of the Bell Telephone Company, founded the International Bell Telephone Company for promoting sales of its telephone equipment throughout Europe. During his tour of the continent the Belgian government offered him the greatest financial incentives to establish a European subsidiary's headquarters in their country.

The International Bell Telephone Company (IBTC) shortly evolved into a holding company for various telephone service and production divisions. Its major manufacturing unit was the Bell Telephone Manufacturing Company (BTMC), which was founded in Antwerp, Belgium, on 26 April 1882. BTMC was created as a joint venture by the International Bell Telephone Company of New York City and the Western Electric Company of Chicago. BTMC then established Compagnie belge du téléphone Bell (Bell Telephone Company of Belgium) in the same year as an operating subsidiary, one of several companies that provided telephone services in the country, the others having evolved principally from telegraph carriers.

BTMC came under majority ownership by the telephone manufacturer Western Electric, and also established multiple other divisions as national companies across Continental Europe and Russia. Western Electric was itself later majority-owned by the American Bell Telephone Company, returning control of BTMC back to the Bell organization.

== Bell Telephone Manufacturing Company ==

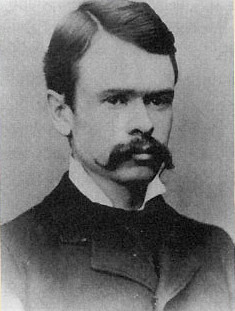
Francis Raymond Welles, c.1880, who became the head of Bell Telephone Manufacturing Company

The Bell Telephone Manufacturing Company (BTMC) was founded on 26 April 1882 as the principal manufacturing business to assist International Bell with its growth throughout Europe, where many countries had nationalistic trade policies favouring domestic suppliers. BTMC was owned 45% by the American Bell Telephone Company, and 55% by Bell's major U.S. supplier, Western Electric, of which Bell was also a majority stakeholder. Western Electric, a U.S. company formed during the era of the telegraph, became American Bell's sole telephone supplier the same year. In a share sale to Western Electric, American Bell later disposed of its ownership of BTMC in 1890 to concentrate on telephone system operations, but since American Bell had been Western Electric's majority shareholder since 1881 it maintained an indirect ownership of IBTC.

The IBTC was created for "...the production, sale, purchase and leasing of equipment for telephony and telegraphy and everything directly or indirectly related to electricity" Later, as demand for services bloomed, the Bell Telephone Company had insufficient operating funds to quickly increase the telephone exchange network, resulting in Western Electric buying out all 45% of the shares held by Bell in 1890.

Ezra Gilliland of Western Electric helped establish the manufacturing arm, at which point a young university educated, multilingual American, Francis R. Welles, took over its leadership, with the title of "Administrateur Delegue". Francis Raymond Welles (b. Athens, Pa., August 18, 1854 – d. Vernet-Les-Bains, France, December 14, 1936), graduated the University of Rochester with an Accelerated bachelor's degree (A.B.) in 1875, and a year later started work as secretary to Enos M. Barton, a co-founder of Western Electric. Barton had earlier sent him to Australia and New Zealand to help with operations there, and Welles was then transferred to Brussels. Welles would lead the overseas BTMC company for the next 30 years assisted by Louis De Groof, a Belgian authorised agent.

IBTC started up subsidiary manufacturing plants in major cities throughout all of Europe, since nationalistic policies favoured local manufacturers. In the year after its founding BTMC employed 35 people, and its workshops were accommodated within a small plant at No. 4 Boudewijnstraat, Antwerp. Its factory was completely rebuilt after a fire in 1882, and by 1885, the Bell Antwerp facility had completed its conversion from importing telephones and switchboards from the U.S., to local manufacturing, with production more than doubling annually as BTMC began to supply their other divisions throughout Europe. By 1900, BTMC was also its new parent's (AT&T) main supplier of telephone systems to Asia, the Middle East and South America, and the facility had increased to a staff of 700 operating from a greatly expanded plant.

The Antwerp facility was largely responsible for introducing the telephone to much of Europe, with its first manual and rotary dial telephone exchanges. In 1884 the very first European intercity line was created between Antwerp and Brussels, and in 1887 the first international line in Europe was opened between Brussels and Paris.

By the end of the nineteenth century European governments moved to nationalize their phone companies, and the telephone service concessions of la Compagnie Belge du Téléphone Bell were allowed to expire or were purchased by the Belgian government.

Francis Welles retired from BTMC in 1913 and returned to the United States shortly before the First World War. Welles and was succeeded by Alexis Mois. The Great War inflicted severe damage to BTMC's operations and production facilities, much of which was destroyed or seized by the invading German army. The company's U.S. managers immediately departed for the United Kingdom or returned home, while many plant employees had been seconded to the Belgian army, or moved to other unoccupied countries. Western Electric's head office contact and control of the company was lost for the duration of the war and almost all engineering development and manufacturing there stopped for the remainder of the war.

In its early existence the Bell Telephone Manufacturing Company of Belgium took on the role of a child of two often squabbling parents, Western Electric and the American Bell Telephone Company (later to become AT&T). Sired by Bell Telephone's Hubbard and Vail it would become the custody of Western Electric through share purchase, which then nurtured and raised it only to see its Belgian concession reclaimed by a nationalistic government. However even through a succession of owners the BTMC has retained its original name, even to the present day. It is currently a unit of Nokia Corporation by the name of Nokia Bell NV.

== Early European expansion ==
=== Belgium ===
The first telephone exchanges in Belgium were opened in 1878. A company was formed in Brussels in 1879, and others followed. Competition was recognised as unsatisfactory, and the various companies were encouraged to amalgamate. The Compagnie Belge du Téléphone Bell (the Bell Telephone Company of Belgium) was formed in 1882, as the Belgian subsidiary of the International Bell Telephone Company of New York. By the end of 1886, the Belgian division had a total 6,900 kilometers of telephone lines, and 3,532 subscribers in seven cities, including Brussels, Antwerp, Charleroi, Ghent, Verviers, and Liège.

The Rotary machine switching system was manufactured in Antwerp from about 1913, and was used by several countries around the world including France, the Netherlands, Norway and New Zealand (but not as hoped by the British Post Office). However manufacture was disrupted by the German invasion in Belgium in 1914.

=== Switzerland ===
The first exchange in Switzerland was opened in Zurich, operated under a license granted by the IBTC to a group of business men on July 24, 1880. During 1881 exchanges were subsequently opened in Geneva, Lausanne, and Winterthur by the government, which shortly after bought out the Zurich exchange. Fourteen exchanges were in operation at the end of 1883, and twice as many a year later.

=== Netherlands ===
The Nederlandsche Bell Telefoon Maatschappij (Dutch Bell Telephone Company) was formed in the Netherlands in 1881. By the end of 1886, the Netherlands division had a total of 3,700 kilometers of telephone line, plus 2,623 subscribers in eight cities, including Amsterdam, Rotterdam, The Hague, Groningen, Haarlem, and Arnhem.

=== Italy ===
In Italy, the company quickly established exchanges in Milan, Turin, and Genoa, and exchanges in a dozen of the other largest cities were started in 1881 by other interests under the auspices of a group of Parisian financiers. By the end of 1886, the Italian division had a total of 8,073 subscribers in twelve cities, plus approximately 12,500 kilometers of telephone lines. The largest exchanges were in Rome (2,022 subscribers), Milan (1,089), Genoa (950) and Naples (873).

=== Sweden and Norway (1881–1908) ===
The International Bell Telephone Company was also responsible for the introduction of the telephone into Norway, and Sweden. In 1881, exchanges were established in Stockholm, Gothenburg, and Malmö.

IBTC established Sweden's first telephone company, Stockholms Bell Telefonaktiebolag, formed with the assistance of three former Swedish PTT superintendents named Lybeck, Bratt and Recin. The new company established their first exchange in the Skandinaviska Kreditaktiebolag Building on Västerlånggatan Street in Stockholm, originally utilizing equipment designed by Alexander Graham Bell and his assistant Thomas Watson, and imported from Bell's supplier in Boston. The first Swedish phones, which had signal coils, ringers and Blake microphones, were available as desk or wall models, connecting to Gilliland type switchboards.

When Bell's Swedish phone exchange formally opened in Stockholm on 1 September 1880, it had 121 subscribers, increasing to 218 later in the year, with the majority of its users belonging to government, business and upper-class homes. The Swedish subsidiary soon opened more exchanges in the Södermalm and Norrmalm sections of the capital within its first year, operating between 9:00 a.m. and 10:00 p.m. daily, but in May 1883 moved to around-the-clock operations, charging subscribers between 160 and 280 Swedish kronor (SEKs) per year depending on their locations within Stockholm (less expensive) or outside of the city proper (more expensive). Bell's fee structure was not notably expensive, as rates were higher in most countries at the time and only lower in a few others.

After 1883 the Bell subsidiary was forced to reduce its fees due to competition from another newly formed phone company, although it was also able to increase its subscriber base. It later had to restrict its operations to the Östermalm section of the city, where it started a new network for private subscribers with lower fees using a different rate plan with a lower number permitted calls per month (its initial rate structure provided unlimited calling). In 1898 the Bell subsidiary contracted with its competitor, SAT, allowing it to operate their facilities, thereby increasing its subscriber base to about 7,000 homes and businesses. Due to government intervention and other reasons, the Bell subsidiaries were eventually legislated out of Sweden and Norway in favour of national firms. Stockholms Bell Telefonaktiebolag ceased its telephone operations completely in 1908, having acquired 15,285 subscribers by that time, in a regulatory environment which had previously permitted unrestricted telephone business competition.

=== Russia ===
The Bell Company introduced the telephone to Russia in 1883 in St. Petersburg and Moscow. By the end of 1886, IBTC's Russian division had a total of 3,440 subscribers in six cities, with 9,550 kilometers of telephone lines. Its largest exchanges were in St. Petersburg (1,080 subscribers), followed by Moscow (690) and Warsaw (533).

Significant trade developed between Belgium and Russia during the Tsarist era, with up to 20,000 Belgians from hundreds of companies working there. However all of the IBTC's Russian investments and plants were subsequently lost during the 1917 Russian Revolution.

== Divestiture ==
At the very close of 1899, the American Bell Telephone Company was acquired, for business purposes, by its own subsidiary, the American Telephone & Telegraph Company (AT&T), which then became the head of the monolithic and monopolistic Bell System.

Significant criticism of AT&T (a monopoly) had emerged in the United States that domestic telephone system rates were higher than they needed to be, and that AT&T was using those revenues to subsidize its European operations. Due to that reason and others, and also due to the U.S. Government's regulatory intervention, AT&T president Walter Gifford divested almost all international interests held by the Bell System in 1925, with the exceptions of the Bell Telephone Company of Canada and Northern Electric.

The European division and its subsidiaries were sold to the International Telephone & Telegraph Company, at the start of that company's meteoric rise in the international telecommunications industry.

== See also ==
- Bell Telephone Company
- Victorian Internet, describing advances in telecommunications during the 19th century, and their effects on society
- Mundaneum, a precursor to the Internet organized in Brussels in 1910
