= Torkild Rieber =

Norwegian-American oil executive (1882–1968)

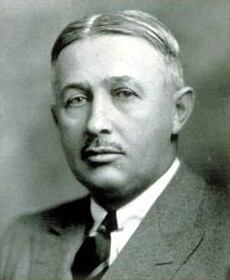
- Time magazine cover, 4 May 1936
- Born: March 13, 1882; Voss Municipality, Norway
- Died: August 10, 1968 (aged 86); Manhattan, New York, United States
- Occupations: Sailor; businessman
- Known for: Chairman of Texaco
- Spouse: Miriam Marbe (m. 1909; died 1938)
- Children: Ruth, Harold

Torkild Rieber (March 13, 1882 – August 10, 1968) was a Norwegian immigrant to the United States who became chairman of the Texas Company (Texaco).

Born in a small town in Norway, Rieber became a seaman at the age of 15. By 1904, he was the master of an oil tanker, which was bought the next year by the newly founded Texas Company, or Texaco. He rose steadily through the ranks to become chairman in 1935. The next year he arranged for Texaco to buy the Barco oil concession in Colombia. Over the next three years he oversaw the major engineering feat of opening the remote oilfield and building a pipeline through rugged and jungle-covered terrain to the Caribbean coast.

Rieber was sympathetic to the fascist regimes in Europe in the 1930s and illegally supplied oil on credit to Francisco Franco's forces during the Spanish Civil War. He also purchased tankers from Germany in exchange for oil. The last tanker was delivered from Hamburg after the outbreak of World War II. For a while, Texaco continued to ship oil to Germany via South America. When Rieber's ties to the Nazis were revealed in August 1940 by British agents in the United States, there was a scandal and he was forced to resign. Rieber continued in the oil industry. Iran nationalized British oil holdings in 1951, but following the 1953 Iranian coup d'état that restored the Shah to power, Rieber negotiated an end to the dispute.

== Early years ==
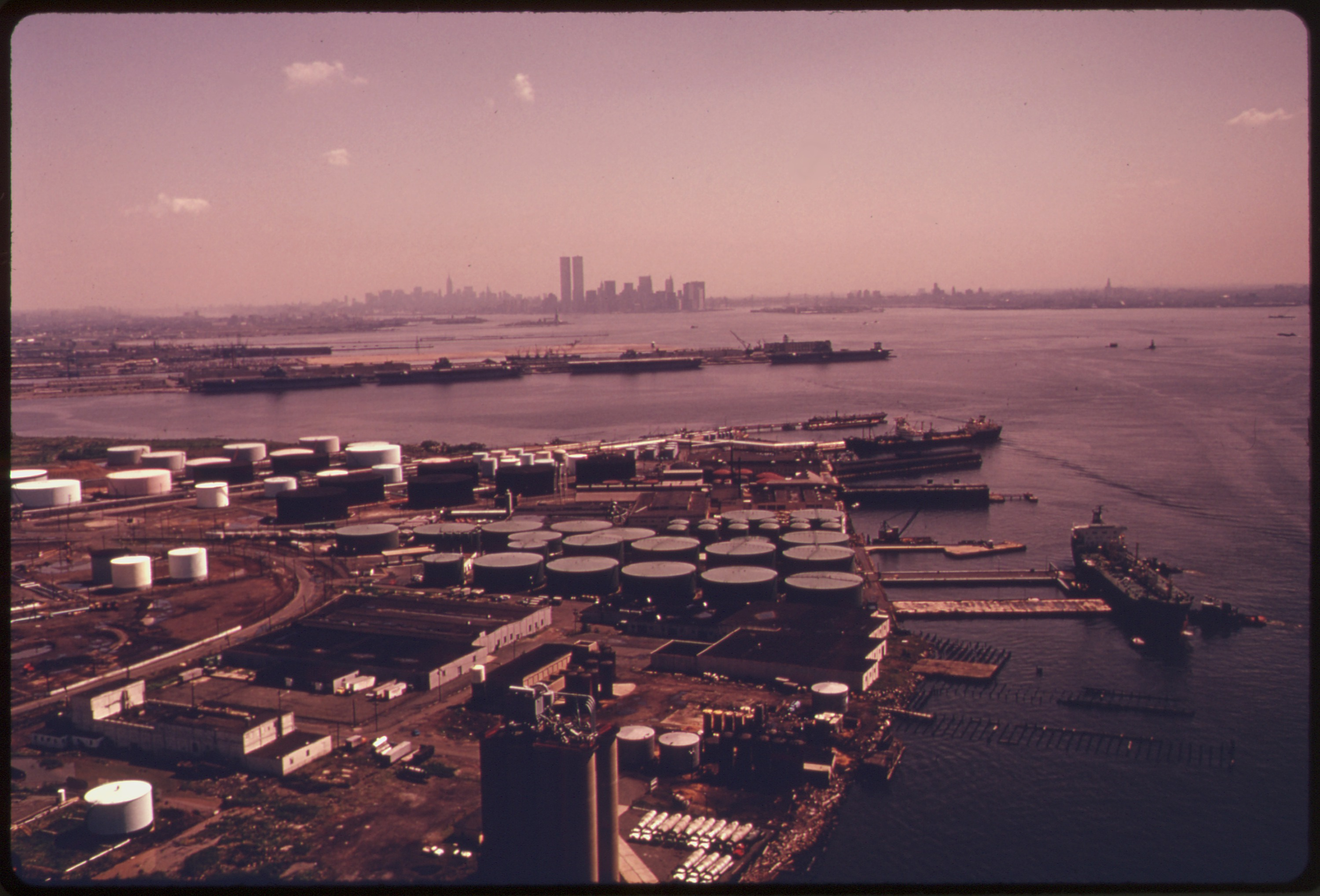
Bayonne oil storage facilities in 1970

Rieber was born in Voss Municipality, Norway, on March 13, 1882, son of the owner of a dye works in a small town about 60 miles (97 km) from Bergen. His family was Lutheran, and he was brought up in an environment where alcohol, dancing and gambling were strictly forbidden. At the age of 15 Rieber left home and joined the full-rigged sailing ship Hiawatha on a six-month voyage around Cape Horn to San Francisco. On return to Norway he attended a school for sailors, and then found work for two years as quartermaster on a barkentine ferrying indentured Indian laborers from Calcutta to British sugar plantations in the West Indies. In 1901, aged 18, he was in command of a French sailing tanker when he was injured in a shipboard fight while docked in Delaware Bay. He was hospitalized and lost his command.

After recovering, Rieber found a position as mate on a Texan oil tanker, the first to leave Texaco's Spindletop facility in Texas. In 1904 he became master of the vessel. Rieber's tanker was bought by the three-year-old Texaco in 1905. After three more years at sea, he was given the job of building a terminal for Texaco at Bayonne, New Jersey. The terminal came into operation before it was complete, and the wooden buildings twice burned down. Rieber arranged for them to be quickly rebuilt. Rieber was then assigned to the company's head office. Rieber married Miriam Marbe in 1909. They had two children, a girl and a boy. Miriam died in 1938. During World War I (1914–1918) he was superintendent of terminals and assistant superintendent of the oil refinery at Port Arthur, Texas.

The first boss of Texaco, Joseph S. Cullinan, fell out with Texaco's directors in 1913 and left to form another oil company, American Republics Corporation. After World War I ended, Rieber left Texaco and became a vice-president at Cullinan's new company. The company struggled to get organized, and in 1927 Rieber accepted an offer to return to Texaco as vice president in charge of exports and marine transportation. He acquired a fleet of new tankers and opened up markets around the world for Texaco. In 1929 and 1930 he tried unsuccessfully to reach an agreement with Heath Eves of the Anglo-Persian Oil Company (later to become British Petroleum) for the two companies to cooperate in Europe or other markets where APOC did not have a partner. In 1935 he was appointed chairman of Texaco, with William Starling Sullivant Rodgers as president. Rieber featured on the cover of Time magazine on 4 May 1936.

== Barco oil concession ==
Barco oil concession and pipeline to Coveñas

In the 1930s Texaco was the fourth largest oil company in the United States, after Standard Oil of New Jersey, Socony-Vacuum and Standard Oil of Indiana, but relied completely on domestic oil fields. Rieber wanted other sources of supply in case the United States banned exports to one or all of Texaco's foreign customers. In 1936 Rieber bought the Barco oil concession in Colombia from Gulf Oil for $14,550,000, and sold a half interest to Socony-Vacuum, now Mobil. The crude oil had to be pumped over the Cordillera Oriental across a 1,000 metres (3,300 ft) pass. From there the line ran west through the low-lying Magdalena River valley, in three places running under the river or one of its tributaries. The 421 kilometres (262 mi) pipeline terminated at the Caribbean port of Coveñas in the Sucre department. The 300 millimetres (12 in) pipe was designed to be able to carry 28,000 barrels per day from the La Petrólea and Tibú fields.

Most of the equipment and supplies were carried by air, a total of 5,000,000 kilograms (11,000,000 lb), landed on airstrips hacked out of the jungle. This included a suspension bridge 76 metres (249 ft) long as well as vehicles, power plants, plumbing and food. At its peak, 5,000 local workers were employed, supervised by 400 Americans. Eight employees of the oil companies were killed by Motilone Indians defending their territory. 62 wells were operational when the pipeline was opened in 1939. The crude was gold-green in color and yielded 49% gasoline on straight-run refining, a very high value. The last weld in the pipeline was made by Gladys Crosby Whitney, wife of Cornelius Vanderbilt Whitney. Total costs to develop the field and the pipeline were $40,000,000.

== Ties to Spanish and German fascists ==
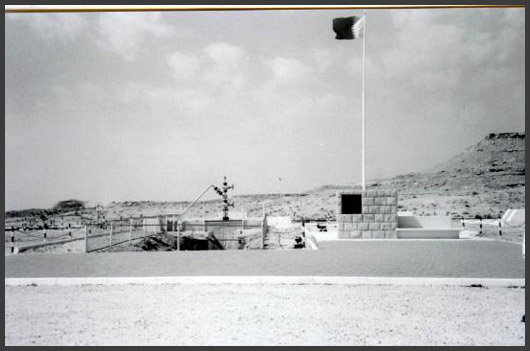
First oil well in Bahrain in 1931

Standard Oil of California had acquired the rights to the Bahrain oilfield in the Persian Gulf and was seeking a partner with market presence in the far east. Rieber made an agreement for joint production with the new California-Texas Oil Company, which also took over Texaco's far eastern market. In 1939, the jointly owned subsidiary returned a total of $12 million to its parents.

In common with many other business leaders, Rieber admired the efficiency of the fascist movements in Europe. The Spanish Civil War erupted in July 1936. Under the January 1937 Neutrality Act, it was illegal to provide credit to either side; Rieber met General Francisco Franco in August 1936 and agreed to supply the Nationalists with oil on credit until the war ended. Neither was it legal for American ships to transport cargo to Spain; yet Texaco ships ostensibly bound for Antwerp, Rotterdam, or Amsterdam were given sealed orders, which diverted them to Spain. The oil was still priced as though Francoist Spain had transported it. Customs agents discovered the scheme, causing a political scandal. In June 1937, President Franklin D. Roosevelt met Rieber and threatened to embargo future shipments. Texaco was fined $22,000. However, Rieber continued the shipments. He directed his associate at the Paris Texaco office, William M. Brewster, to relay to the Nationalists intelligence on the Spanish Republicans, such as fuel amounts, cost, and type. In total, Texaco delivered to the Nationalists 3.5 million tons of oil for a total of $20 million. For his service, Rieber was given the title of Knight of the Grand Cross of the Order of Isabella the Catholic by Franco.

In 1936, Rieber commissioned several oil tankers from the Deutsche Werft shipyard in Hamburg, Germany, in return for oil. The Skandinavia tanker was not complete before the outbreak of World War II in September 1939. Although the United States was neutral, the Germans did not want to release a tanker that could be used to supply their enemies. Rieber flew to Berlin to negotiate with the German naval officials. He was successful, and Admiral Erich Raeder allowed the tanker to sail under the flag of Panama to ship oil to neutral countries. In December 1939, Rieber and Hermann Göring made a tour of factories in Germany. They were flown by Pete Clausen, a Pan American Airlines pilot. Rieber continued to ship Colombian oil to Germany, despite the British embargo. According to a German secret service report, Rieber was "absolutely pro-German ... a sincere admirer of the Führer."

Rieber met Field Marshal Hermann Göring in 1940 and was given a message from Adolf Hitler to President Roosevelt, inviting him to support Berlin's plan for a European Union, led by Germany, which would open its doors to the United States. Roosevelt rejected the offer. Rieber also talked with the German agent Gerhardt Alois Westrick, who was gathering information about American armaments and intentions concerning the European war. After the fall of France, Westrick threw a celebratory party at the Waldorf Astoria New York hotel on 26 June 1940, attended by senior executives of IT&T, General Motors and Ford as well as by Rieber. Westrick posed as a trade official and made much of the huge trade potential with the new German empire once Britain had been defeated, which would soon be accomplished. Westrick also met with Rieber at his head office in the Chrysler Building. The British secret service disclosed this to the American press, causing an uproar.

Publicity about Captain Rieber's pro-Nazi views began to threaten Texaco's sales. After a stormy meeting in August 1940, the Texaco board of directors forced Rieber to resign. In July 1940, Life magazine had published a lengthy profile of Rieber. Reporting his resignation in the 26 August 1940 issue, Life whitewashed his support of the Nazis, portraying him as an innocent victim whose only errors had been to dine with Westrick and lend him a Texas Co. car.

== Later career ==
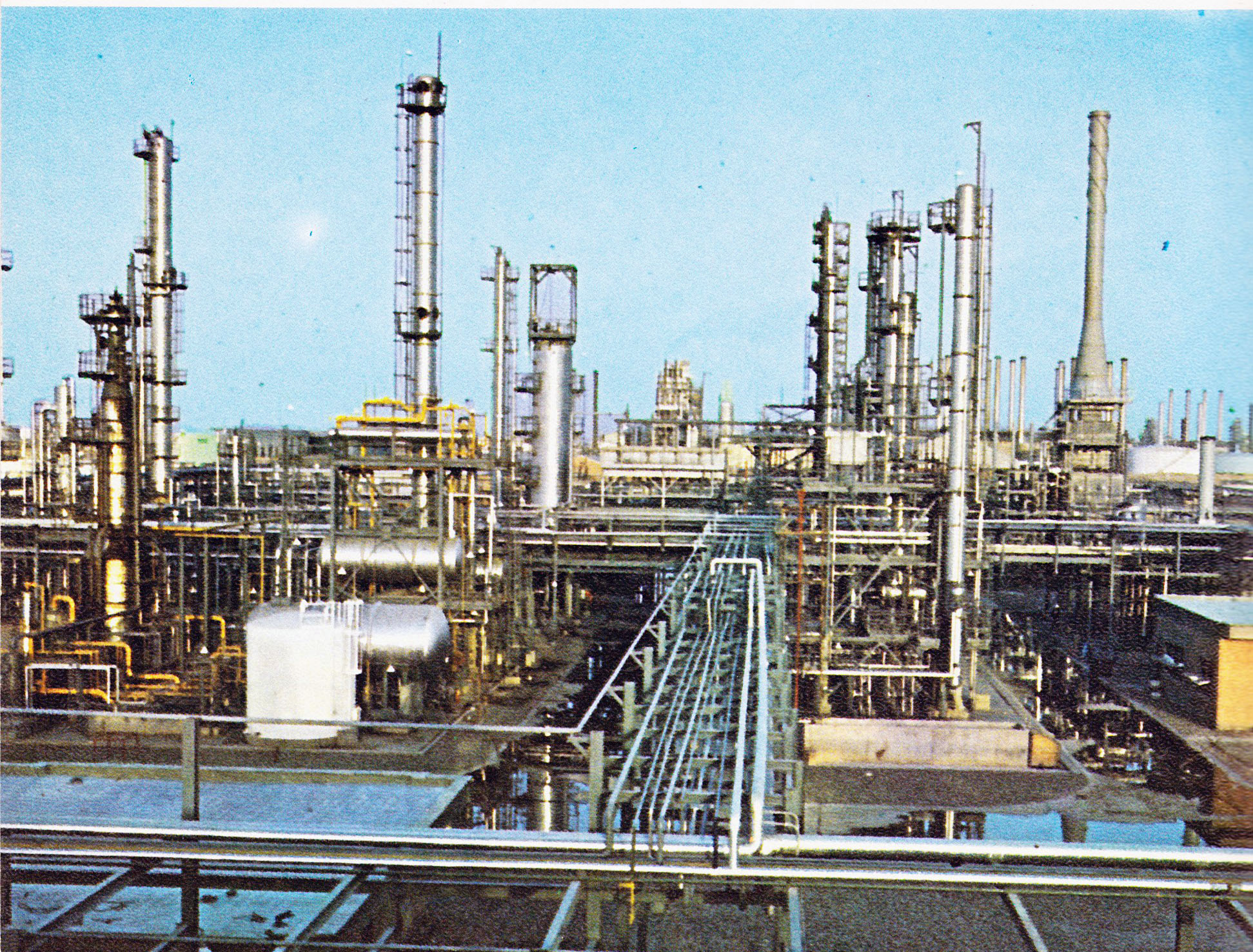
Abadan Petrochemical Complex in 1970

Rieber became president of the independent Barber Oil Company after he left Texaco. In March 1951 the Iranian parliament voted to nationalize the Anglo-Iranian Oil Company (AIOC, renamed from Anglo-Persian Oil Company in 1935), triggering the Abadan Crisis. The AIOC withdrew its employees, and under pressure from Britain other countries embargoed Iranian oil. The Iranians asked for help from the World Bank to resolve the dispute, and the idea was floated that the bank might run the Iranian oil industry in the interim. The World Bank assigned Rieber to assist Hector Prud'homme in examining the oil installations in Iran. The two men arrived in Iran on 31 December 1951 and met prime minister Mohammad Mosaddegh the next day, giving him a message from Robert Garner of the International Bank for Reconstruction and Development before going on to inspect the facilities at Abadan.

In February 1952 Rieber was part of a larger World Bank mission sent to negotiate an arrangement for restarting oil production pending agreement with the British over ownership of the assets. One sticking point was that the Iranians would not allow British oil technicians to return, and it would not be practical to find sufficient technicians from other countries. The main obstacle was the British demand for revenue sharing. In 1953 the British and Americans sponsored a coup that restored the western-oriented but autocratic Shah Mohammad Reza Pahlavi in place of the elected government. Rieber became adviser to the new Iranian government, and assisted them in their negotiations in 1954 with a consortium of Standard Oil of New Jersey, Royal Dutch Shell and the Anglo-Iranian Oil Company. His influence may be seen in the eventual settlement.

In 1963 Rieber attended a fortieth anniversary celebration of Time magazine hosted by the publisher Henry Luce at the Waldorf Astoria, attended by many of the people that had been featured on the magazine's cover over the years. He died in Manhattan on August 10, 1968, aged 86.
