= Claro Puerto Rico =

Puerto Rican telecommunication company

Telecomunicaciones de Puerto Rico, Inc.
- Trade name: Claro
- Native name: Telecomunicaciones de Puerto Rico, Inc.
- Type: Subsidiary of América Móvil
- Industry: Telecommunications
- Predecessor: Puerto Rico Telephone Company (Telefónica de Puerto Rico); Puerto Rico Communications Corporation (Autoridad de Comunicaciones)
- Founded: 1914; 112 years ago
- Headquarters: Guaynabo, Puerto Rico
- Area served: Puerto Rico
- Parent: ITT Corporation (1920–1974); Government-owned corporations of Puerto Rico (1974–1998); General Telephone & Electronics Corporation (1998–2000); Verizon Communications (2000–2007); América Móvil (since 2007)
- Subsidiaries: CoquiNet Corporation, Puerto Rico Telephone Company, Inc.
- Website: claropr.com (in Spanish)

Claro Puerto Rico (Telecomunicaciones de Puerto Rico, Inc., doing business as Claro (formerly TELPRI), is the largest telecommunications service provider in Puerto Rico. It is headquartered in Guaynabo, Puerto Rico, and has operated for almost a century offering voice, data, long distance, broadband, directory publishing and wireless services for the island residents and businesses. It was founded by the Behn brothers, Sosthenes and Hernan in 1914. Originally, Puerto Rico Telephone Company eventually spawned ITT Corporation, which was founded by Sosthenes Behn. The company was a public corporation of the government of Puerto Rico for many years until the majority stakes were acquired by GTE in the mid-1990s. It was a subsidiary of Verizon Communications until it was fully acquired by América Móvil in 2007.

== Present Day ==
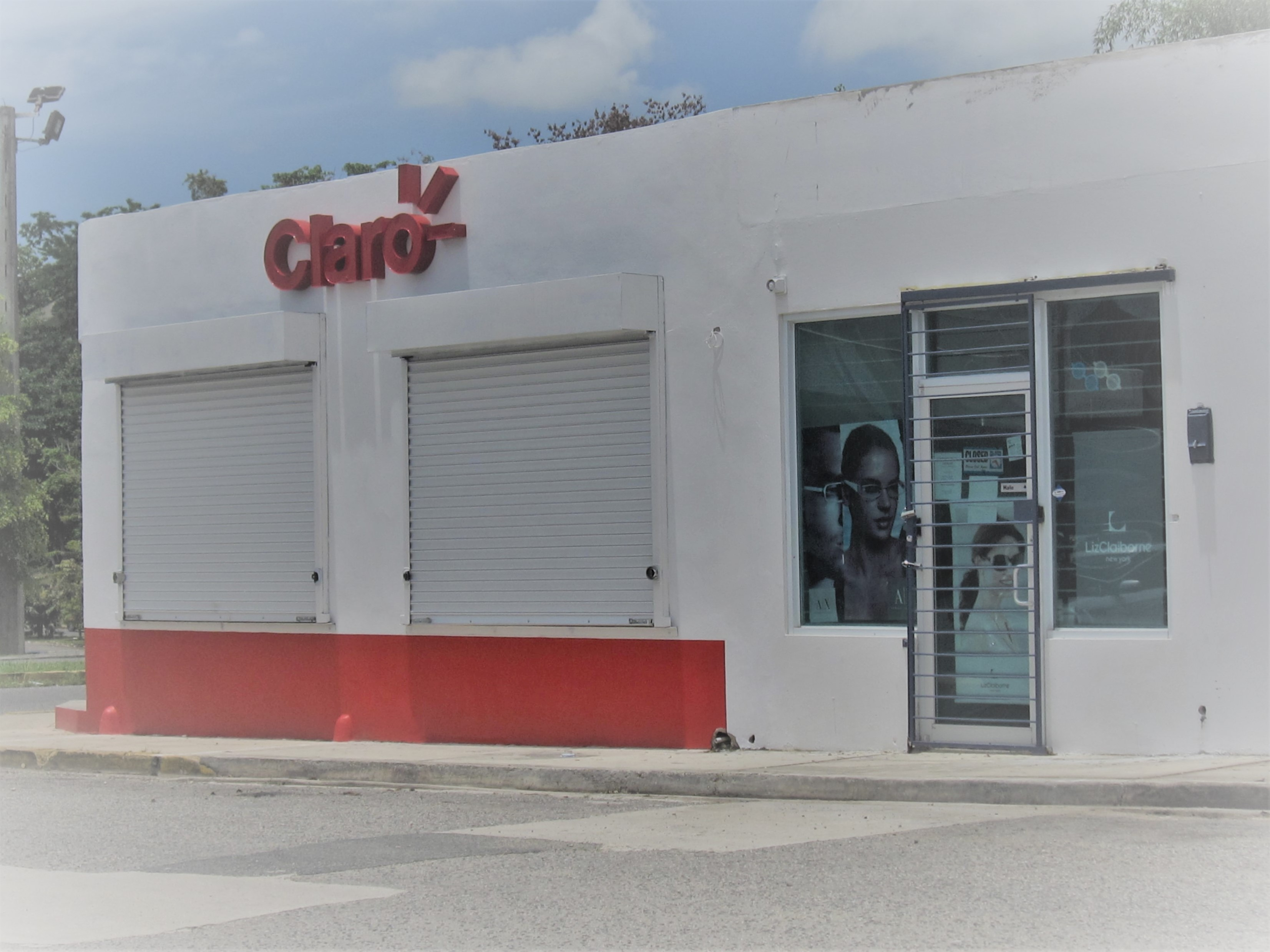
Claro in Morovis, Puerto Rico

On April 3, 2006, Verizon Communications announced it had agreed to sell its stakes in Telecomunicaciones de Puerto Rico, Inc. (TELPRI) and their sole ownership of the main Dominican telephone company Verizon Dominicana, now Claro República Dominicana, to América Móvil of Mexico.

On December 31, 2006, Verizon and América Móvil completed Verizon Dominicana ownership transfer into Mexican hands. After another three months and various litigations upon the Federal Communications Commission, which had advised from the Puerto Rico Telecommunications Board, on March 30, 2007, TELPRI assets were completely acquired by América Móvil. The purchase was closed after an agreement to purchase from Popular, Inc., the government of Puerto Rico and the telephone company employee stock ownership program, the remaining stocks of TELPRI at the same price as Verizon.

Currently, América Móvil is the 100% owner of the company and has rebranded the wireless arm of the company -formerly Verizon Wireless- under their international Claro brand.

As of February 2011, America Móvil has rebranded its wireline (fixed line), broadband DSL, television and dial-up services as Claro. The only services that, for now, remain branded as Claro - Puerto Rico Telephone are business, government or corporate.

Effective March 2013, all Claro Puerto Rico have been rebranded. Services to business, government and enterprises are now offered under the Claro Empresas brand.

== Relationship with Verizon Wireless ==
Until 2014, Claro continued to offer a CDMA network for Verizon Wireless customers as well as legacy Claro customers. The CDMA network appeared as "Extended Network" coverage on Verizon - meaning the majority of Verizon customers were able to use it at no extra charge. Prepaid providers like Page Plus Cellular, however, had to pay roaming in Puerto Rico.

Data access for Verizon customers was at full speed. However, Claro deployed EV-DO before launching its GSM/UMTS network. As a result, Claro had the slowest CDMA coverage on Verizon Wireless at sub-3G 1xRTT speeds, peaking at 144-230 kbit/speed. Roaming customers would not access the EV-DO local network.

Data, like voice, was Extended Network coverage which had per-KB roaming charges on some older plans.

As of 2014, the former Verizon CDMA network has been shut down with Claro now using GSM, UMTS, and LTE exclusively. Verizon has since signed a 2G and 3G CDMA roaming agreement with Open Mobile, where Verizon customers can use its network without charge. Later on, Verizon signed another agreement with Claro to also allow customers to use their LTE network.

== See also ==
- List of United States telephone companies
