= ITT Inc. =

American worldwide manufacturing company

- Formerly: International Telephone and Telegraph Corporation (1920-1983); ITT Corporation (1983-1995); ITT Industries, Inc. (1996-2006); ITT Corporation (2006-2016)
- Type: Public
- Traded as: NYSE: ITT; S&P 400 Component
- Industry: Industrial manufacturer (historically, a telecommunications conglomerate)
- Founded: June 16, 1920; 106 years ago
- Founder: Hernan Behn; Sosthenes Behn
- Headquarters: Stamford, Connecticut, United States
- Area served: Worldwide
- Key people: Luca Savi (CEO and president)
- Products: Aerospace, transportation, energy and industrial components
- Revenue: ▲US$2.988 billion (2022)
- Operating income: ▼US$468.0 million (2022)
- Net income: ▲US$367.0 million (2022)
- Total assets: ▲US$1.8368 billion (2022)
- Total equity: ▲US$2.248 billion (2022)
- Number of employees: >10,000 (2022)
- Divisions: ITT Interconnect Solutions
- Website: itt.com

ITT Inc. is an American manufacturing company based in Stamford, Connecticut. The company produces specialty components for the aerospace, transportation, energy, and industrial markets. ITT's three business units are Industrial Process, Motion Technologies, and Connect and Control Technologies.

ITT has over 10,000 employees in more than 35 countries and serves customers in more than 100 countries. The company's long-standing brands include Goulds Pumps, Cannon connectors, KONI shock absorbers, and Enidine energy absorption components.

The company was founded on June 16, 1920 as International Telephone & Telegraph Corporation (I.T. & T.) in Maryland.

ITT divested its telecommunications assets in 1986. In 1995, ITT split into three separate public companies: ITT Hartford Group Inc., its insurance companies group, which later changed its name to The Hartford Financial Services Group, Inc.; ITT Corp., including Sheraton Hotels and Resorts, which later merged into an expanded Starwood; and ITT Industries, which changed its name in 2006 to ITT Corporation.

In 2011, ITT Corporation spun off its defense businesses into a company named Exelis, and its water technology business into a company named Xylem Inc. ITT Corporation changed its name to ITT Inc. in 2016.

== History ==
=== Beginnings and early acquisitions ===
Following their military service, brothers and former sugar brokers Lt. Hernand Behn and Colonel Sosthenes Behn formed International Telephone & Telegraph (ITT) in 1920. Hernand served as its first president, leading the company until his death in 1933, and growing its assets to over $500 million. Sosthenes served as a second vice-president, and later as chairman.

Previously, the brothers had first acquired the bankrupt Puerto Rico Telephone Company, as settlement for a bad debt, in 1914, along with the Cuban-American Telephone and Telegraph Company and a half-interest in the Cuban Telephone Company. ITT's first major expansion came in 1923, when it consolidated operators in the telecoms market in Spain into what eventually became Telefónica. During the 1920s, ITT acquired European and American telephone companies, including International Western Electric (AT&T's European-based manufacturer of telephonic equipment), in 1925, for $30 million, renaming it International Standard Electric Corp.; All-American Cables, Inc.; Commercial Cable Co.; telegraph company Postal Telegraph and Cable Corp.; and radio company Mackay Radio and Telegraph Co.

In July 1924, the company was awarded the Spanish telephone service contract, and established Compania Telefonica Nacional de Espana SA (CTNE).

In 1925, ITT purchased several companies from Western Electric, as Bell had agreed to "divest" itself of its international operations. They included the Bell Telephone Manufacturing Company (BTM) of Antwerp, Belgium, which manufactured rotary system switching equipment, and the British International Western Electric, which was renamed Standard Telephones and Cables (STC). Compagnie Générale d'Electricité later purchased BTM; Nortel later purchased STC.

In 1930, ITT acquired a German holding company, Standard Elektrizitäts-Gesellschaft (SEG), with its subsidiaries, Ferdinand Schuchardt Berliner Frensprech- und Telegraphenwerk, A. G., Süddeutsche Apparate Fabrik G.m.b.H., Nuremberg and Mix & Genest.

It acquired Romanian telecommunications monopoly Societatea Anonima Română de Telefoane. Its only serious rival was the Theodore Gary & Company conglomerate, which operated a subsidiary, Associated Telephone and Telegraph, with manufacturing plants in Europe.

In the United States, ITT acquired the various companies of the Mackay Companies in 1928 through a specially organized subsidiary corporation, Postal Telegraph & Cable. These companies included the Commercial Cable Company, the Commercial Pacific Cable Company, Postal Telegraph, and the Federal Telegraph Company.

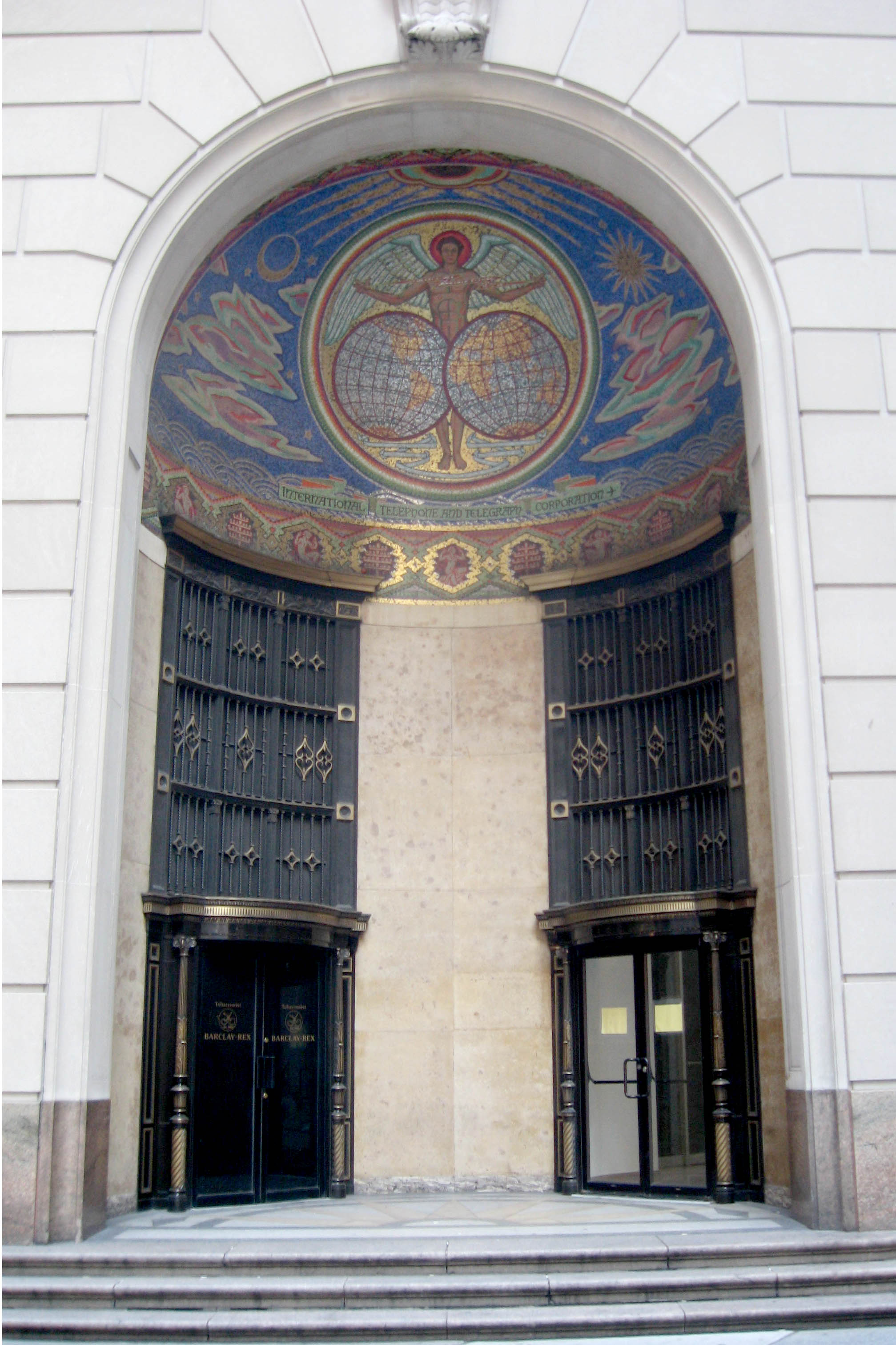
75 Broad Street, Manhattan, former headquarters of ITT

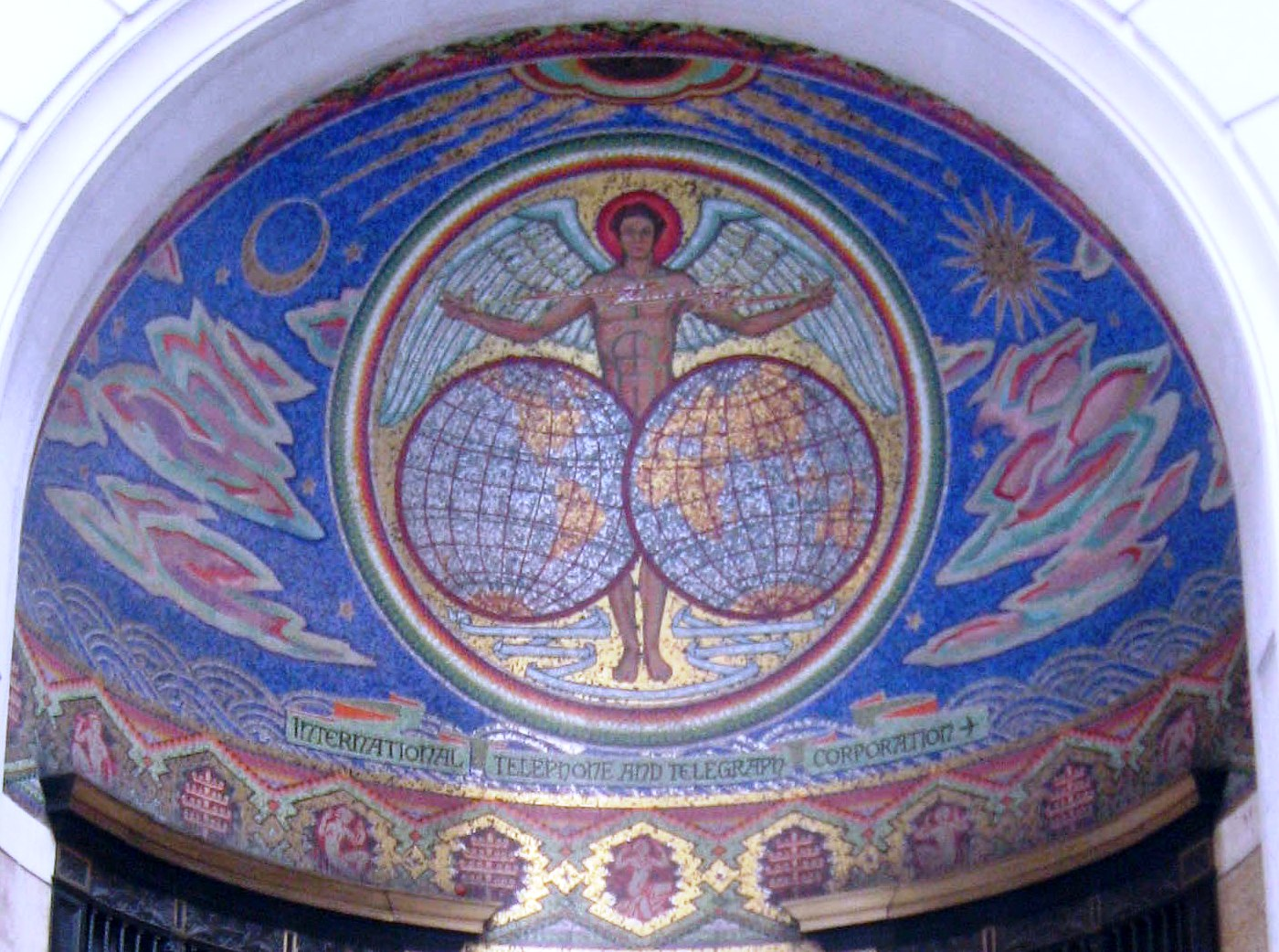
Detail of door

=== German subsidiaries in the Nazi period ===
On August 3, 1933, Adolf Hitler received Sosthenes Behn (then the CEO of ITT) and his German representative, Henry Mann, in one of his first meetings with US businesspeople. Subsequently, Sosthenes Behn came into contact with the Keppler's circle of German bankers and businessmen who formed an inner circle of support for Hitler. Kurt Baron von Schröder and Emil Heinrich Meyer joined the ITT board, with Schröder becoming a conduit of funds from ITT to Heinrich Himmler's SS organization, according to author Antony C. Sutton, in his book, Wall Street and the Rise of Hitler.

ITT subsidiaries reportedly made cash payments to SS leader Himmler. ITT, through its subsidiary C. Lorenz AG, owned 25% of Focke-Wulf, the German aircraft manufacturer and builder of some of the most successful Luftwaffe fighter aircraft. In the 1960s, ITT Corporation won $27 million in compensation for damage inflicted on its share of the Focke-Wulf plant by Allied bombing during World War II. In addition, Sutton's book uncovers that ITT owned shares of Signalbau AG, Dr. Erich F. Huth (Signalbau Huth), which produced for the German Wehrmacht radar equipment and transceivers in Berlin, Hanover (later the Telefunken factory), and other places. While ITT-Focke-Wulf planes were bombing Allied ships and ITT lines were passing information to German submarines, ITT direction-finders were saving other ships from torpedoes. The payments to Himmler were noted in a 1946 banking investigation report by the Office of Military Government, United States.

After merging Federal Telephone and Radio Corporation into ITT Kellogg, in 1940, and combining manufacturing operations, the name again changed to ITT Telecommunications, eventually reverting to ITT Kellogg. That year, Hernand Behn, son of ITT's deceased co-founder, was reported as being transferred to Buenos Aires by the company.

In 1943, ITT became the largest shareholder of Focke-Wulf Flugzeugbau GmbH with 29% and remained so for the duration of the war. This was due to Kaffee HAG's share falling to 27% after the death in May of Kaffee HAG chief Dr. Ludwig Roselius. OMGUS documents reveal that the role of the HAG conglomerate could not be determined during WWII.

=== Post-war activity and acquisitions ===
Major General William H. Harrison served as president from 1948, until his death in 1956, with Colonel Behn as chairman.

In 1951, ITT purchased Philo Farnsworth's television company to break into that market. At the time, Farnsworth was also developing the Fusor fusion reactor, which was funded by ITT until 1967. Also in 1951, ITT bought a majority interest in the Kellogg Switchboard & Supply Company (founded in 1897 as a pioneer in "divided-multiple" telephone switchboards) and bought the remaining shares the next year. ITT changed the company's name to ITT Kellogg.

One prominent subsidiary of this firm was the American Cable and Radio Corporation, which operated the transatlantic cables of the Commercial Cable Company, among other ventures. It bought Philadelphia-based heating and air-conditioning manufacturer John J. Nesbitt Inc.

=== Community development ===
In 1968 ITT acquired timberland company Rayonier which owned over 30,000 acres (46.875 square miles) in Flagler County, Florida. ITT wanted more from their investment than the proceeds of wood pulp from slash pine trees. At the time, thousands of people were migrating to Florida from the Rust Belt, so management at ITT decided to create a destination with both housing and jobs for the transplants. ITT purchased tracts from 35 other owners to total 93,000 acres (145.3 square miles), the size of Cleveland or Detroit. From the start, ITT assumed that their financial resources would solve any problems encountered. There are failed developments all over Florida, but most are because of money problems.

That same year, ITT purchased homebuilder Levitt & Sons for a reported $91 million and established Palm Coast Construction Company, which built half the residences in the development. Dr. Norman Young led Levitt's marketing group, who planned the project and suggested the name, Palm Coast. The development was conceived by ITT's Community Development Corporation (ITT-CDC) in the 1960s as a master-planned community to transform 90,000 acres of wetlands and pine forest into a residential golf-centered city of 600,000 or 750,000.

Sheraton Hotels and Resorts were acquired by ITT in 1968 for $200M in stock. ITT built the Sheraton Palm Coast Resort in the early 1970s to house potential buyers for the Palm Coast development. It was a small hotel with 106 rooms, not a typical Sheraton property, and it was later demolished.

=== International telecommunications ===
International telecommunications manufacturing subsidiaries included Standard Telephones and Cables in the United Kingdom and Australia, Indosat in Indonesia, Standard Elektrik Lorenz (today part of Nokia Germany) and Intermetall Gesellschaft für Metallurgie und Elektronik mbH (acquired from Clevite in 1965; now TDK-Micronas) in Germany, BTM in Belgium, and CGCT and LMT in France. These companies manufactured equipment according to ITT designs, including the (1960s) Pentaconta crossbar switch and (1970s) Metaconta D, L, and 10c Stored Program Control exchanges, mostly for sale to their respective national telephone administrations. This equipment was also produced under license in Poznań (Poland) and in Yugoslavia and elsewhere. ITT was the largest owner of the LM Ericsson company in Sweden but sold out in 1960.

Alec Reeves, an ITT employee in France in the 1930s, developed pulse-code modulation (PCM) innovations, upon which future digital voice communication was based. Charles K. Kao, working at STC in the UK, pioneered the use of optical fiber from 1966, for which he was awarded the 2009 Nobel Prize in Physics.

=== Harold Geneen's appointment ===
In 1959, Harold Geneen became CEO. Using leveraged buyouts, he turned the minor acquisitions of the 1950s into major growth during the 1960s. In 1965, ITT attempted to purchase the ABC television network for $700 million. The deal was halted by federal antitrust regulators who feared ITT was growing too large. ITT moved to acquire companies outside the telecommunications industry to continue its growth without violating antitrust legislation. Under Geneen's leadership, ITT acquired over 300 companies in the 1960s, with some of these acquisitions being hostile takeovers. The deals included well-known businesses like the Sheraton hotel chain, Wonder Bread maker Continental Baking, and Avis Rent-a-Car. ITT also absorbed smaller operations in auto parts, energy, books, semiconductors, and cosmetics. In 1966, ITT acquired Educational Services, Inc., an operator of for-profit schools, which became ITT/ESI. When ITT attempted to acquire The Hartford insurance company in 1970, the US Justice Department filed suit, and ITT agreed to divest assets equal to those of Hartford's, including Avis.

During the 1960s and 1970s, under Geneen's leadership, ITT rose to prominence as the archetypal conglomerate, deriving its growth from hundreds of acquisitions in diversified industries. Sales grew from about $700 million in 1960 to about $8 billion in 1970, and profit from $29 million to $550 million. However, when increased interest rates started eating away at profits in the late 1960s, growth slowed considerably.

In the late 1960s, the British electronics manufacturer Kolster-Brandes Limited, KB for short, had run into trouble with its color television manufacturing and turned to ITT for help; ITT bought out the company, and for a while, UK products were badged "ITT KB" then eventually just ITT. By the late 1970s, ITT had a substantial presence on the UK domestic electrical market in television, audio, and portable radio products.

In 1972 the KONI Group, manufacturer of shock absorbers, was added to the list of ITT's acquisitions.

=== Brazilian expropriation in 1962 ===
In February 1962, during the presidency of João Goulart, the State Governor of Rio Grande do Sul, Leonel Brizola, decided to expropriate a Brazilian subsidiary of ITT, the Companhia Telefônica Nacional. During the following years of Goulart's presidency, the expropriation was one of the most debated Brazilian political issues. The action from the state governor to expropriate the company was never supported by the Brazilian president at the time and had severe implications for Brazil–United States relations. Some historians even say that the expropriation was one of the reasons for the federal government of the United States supporting the 1964 Brazilian coup d'état.

=== 1972 Republican National Convention ===
ITT became involved in a scandal related to the 1972 Republican National Convention. In May 1971, ITT president Geneen pledged $400,000 to support a proposal to hold the convention in San Diego; only $100,000 of the contribution was publicly disclosed. The Republican National Committee selected San Diego as the site in July 1971.

However, on February 29, 1972, newspaper columnist Jack Anderson disclosed an interoffice memo from ITT lobbyist Dita Beard to ITT vice president Bill Merriam, dated June 25, 1971. The memo appeared to draw a connection between ITT's contribution to the convention and the favorable settlement of a United States Department of Justice Antitrust Division lawsuit. The resulting scandal, including a Senate investigation and the threat of criminal charges, caused ITT to withdraw its support for the San Diego convention. That, combined with a shortage of hotel space and problems with the proposed venue, led the RNC to move the convention to Miami. Special prosecutor Leon Jaworski investigated the case but ultimately concluded there was no evidence of criminal conduct by ITT.

Nixon aides such as John Dean and Jeb Stuart Magruder have alleged that the Watergate break-in was motivated by the Committee for the Re-Election of the President's suspicion that the Democratic National Committee was making similar deals to fund its 1972 convention. This theory is supported by conversations and exchanges between President Richard Nixon and his chief of staff H. R. Haldeman before and after the break-in, as well as by testimony by E. Howard Hunt. However, this theory has also been disputed by others involved in the break-in, such as G. Gordon Liddy.

=== Involvement in 1973 Pinochet coup in Chile ===
In 1970, ITT owned 70% of CTC (the Chilean Telephone Company, now Movistar Chile) and funded El Mercurio, a Chilean right-wing newspaper. ITT also had some $200 million worth of investments in Chile. Under Geneen's leadership, ITT funneled $350,000 to Allende's opponent, Jorge Alessandri. When Allende won the presidential election, ITT offered the CIA $1,000,000 to defeat Allende, though the offer was rejected. Declassified documents released by the U.S. Central Intelligence Agency in 2000 reveal that the company financially helped opponents of Salvador Allende's government prepare a military coup. On September 28, 1973, an ITT building in New York City was bombed by the Weather Underground for involvement in the coup d'état.

=== Post-Geneen: Hamilton and Araskog ===
In March 1977, Lyman C. Hamilton was appointed CEO, and Geneen became chairman of the board. In June 1979, while Hamilton was in Asia, Geneen became aware of Hamilton's plans to divest ITT's European consumer goods business and lobbied his fellow board members to dismiss him. In July 1979, Rand Araskog became CEO. Shortly thereafter, Araskog insisted that the board remove Geneen as chairman, though Geneen remained on the board for four more years.

Araskog over the next two decades dismantled much of ITT, selling most of its holdings.

Starting in 1977, ITT set out to develop an ambitious new Digital Telephone Exchange, System 1240 (later System 12), which reportedly cost US$1 billion. According to Fortune's Myron Magnet in 1985, Araskog directed the company's efforts towards a relentless pursuit of developing and promoting System 12, while channeling profits from successful ventures into fulfilling System 12's voracious demands. System 12 was intended to operate in all markets and in all modes, from local switches to long distance. The design was done at the Advanced Technology Center (Stamford, Connecticut, and then Shelton, Connecticut). Manufacturing was by ITT's subsidiaries, such as BTM in Belgium, where the first production system was installed at Brecht in August 1982. Initial sales, particularly in Europe and Mexico, were strong, but the new system took longer than expected to integrate, with further losses. Against the advice of headquarters, ITT Telecommunications (ITT Kellogg) in Raleigh, North Carolina, undertook the conversion in the US market, and although sales were announced in 1984 and 1985, the attempt ultimately failed in early 1986.

ITT divested its global telecommunications product ventures, such as ITT Kellogg, to Alcatel Alsthom, a subsidiary of Compagnie Générale d'Electricité (CGE), resulting in the establishment of Alcatel N.V. (Netherlands) in 1986. This transaction positioned Alcatel N.V. as the world's second-largest telecommunications company at that time. Initially, ITT retained a 37% ownership stake, but in March 1992, it proceeded to sell off its remaining 30%, effectively ceasing its participation in the telephone industry. In 2006, Alcatel Alsthom S.A. merged with Lucent to form Alcatel-Lucent.

ITT Educational Services, Inc. (ESI) was spun off through an IPO in 1994, with ITT as an 83% shareholder (in September 2016, ESI announced plans to close all of its 130 technical institutes in 38 states because their students were no longer eligible for federal aid). ITT merged its long-distance division with Metromedia Long Distance in March 1989, creating Metromedia-ITT. Long Distance Discount Services, Inc. (LDDS) eventually acquired Metromedia-ITT in 1993. Subsequently, LDDS would rename itself WorldCom in 1995.

=== 1995 breakup ===
In 1995, with Araskog still at the helm, ITT split into three separate public companies:

- ITT Hartford Group Inc. The insurance companies group dropped ITT from its name in 1997, becoming The Hartford Financial Services Group, Inc.
- ITT Industries. ITT operated under this name until 2006 and is a major manufacturing and defense contractor business.
  - On July 1, 2006, ITT Industries changed its name to ITT Corporation as a result of its shareholders' vote on May 9, 2006.
- ITT Corp. In 1997, ITT Corp. completed a merger with Starwood, which wanted to acquire Sheraton Hotels and Resorts. Starwood sold ITT World Directories to VNU. ITT completely divested from ITT/ESI by 1999 but continued to license the ITT Technical Institute name to ESI until its demise in 2016. Also in 1999, ITT Corp. dropped the ITT name in favor of Starwood.

=== Criminal prosecution ===
In March 2007, ITT Corporation became the first major defense contractor to be convicted for criminal violations of the U.S. Arms Export Control Act. The fines resulted from ITT's outsourcing program, in which they transferred night vision goggles and classified information about countermeasures against laser weapons, including light interference filters, to engineers in Singapore, the People's Republic of China, and the United Kingdom. They were fined US$100 million although they were also given the option of spending half of that sum on research and development of new night vision technology. The United States government will assume rights to the resulting intellectual property.

In its investigation and subsequent ruling, the United States Department of Justice found that the corporation went to significant lengths to circumvent rules regarding the exports, including setting up a front company. According to U.S. Attorney John L. Brownlee, the company fought the investigation in order "to essentially run out the clock on the statute of limitations."

=== 2011 restructuring as three public companies ===
On January 12, 2011, ITT announced a transformation to separate the remaining company into three publicly traded independent companies. On July 14, 2011, ITT announced the names of the three companies:

- The Industrial Process & Flow Control division would retain the name ITT Corporation.
  - ITT Corporation changed its name to ITT Inc. in 2016.
- The Water & Wastewater division was renamed Xylem Inc., with the stock symbol XYL, which refers to xylem tissue in plants.
- The Defense division became Exelis Inc., symbol XLS. Exelis was acquired by Harris Corporation in 2015.

Then-ITT stockholders subsequently owned shares in all three companies following the spinoff.

=== 21st century acquisitions ===
On June 26, 2007, ITT reached an agreement to acquire the privately held International Motion Control (IMC) for $395 million. The transaction was finalized in September 2007. Subsequently, on September 14, 2010, an announcement was made to close the Cleveland site.

An agreement was reached on September 18, 2007, for ITT to buy EDO Corporation for $1.7 billion. After EDO shareholders' approval, the deal was closed and finalized on December 20, 2007.

On April 16, 2009, ITT announced it had signed a definitive agreement to acquire Laing GmbH of Germany, a privately held leading producer of energy-efficient circulator pumps primarily used in residential and commercial plumbing and heating, ventilating, and air conditioning (HVAC) systems.

In December 2025, ITT agreed to a $4.8 billion acquisition of SPX Flow from Lone Star Funds.

== Headquarters ==
In 1929, ITT's headquarters were at (75) 67 Broad Street, Manhattan, New York, New York. "During World War II the building was a hub for communications with American submarines operating in the Atlantic Ocean."

From 1961 to 1989, ITT's headquarters were at 320 Park Ave., New York.

1330 Sixth Avenue in Manhattan, New York City, which was ITT's corporate headquarters prior to its merger with Starwood, was originally owned by the American Broadcasting Company (ABC), which ITT attempted to acquire in 1963. After a financial downturn, ABC moved out of the building known as "Brown Rock" and sold it to a Japanese conglomerate, which then in turn leased a beneficial portion out to ITT Corporation.

In 2022, ITT's global headquarters relocated from White Plains, New York to Harbor Point in Stamford, Connecticut.

== ITT Avionics ==
ITT Avionics was a division of ITT Corporation in Nutley, New Jersey. A 300-foot research tower at ITT Avionics just off Washington Ave. (Nutley, New Jersey) was built in 1947 for scientists to research microwave communication systems. Research at the tower had stopped in the 1970s. On the morning of April 4, 1996, at 10:00 am, the tower was demolished with explosives to prepare the site for sale.

In October 1989, the Naval Air Systems Command (NAVAIR) awarded a contract to ITT Avionics for production of an Airborne Self-Protection Jammer (ASPJ), and a similar contract was issued to Westinghouse Electric Corporation. Westinghouse and ITT had worked together with the U.S. government to develop the ASPJ. The contract was later terminated by the government for convenience because the ASPJ failed independent operational test and evaluation (OPEVAL) procedures.

In 1991, the company won a $19.6 million contract from the United States Air Force to develop the "intraflight data link," a communications system for "tactical airborne forces". In 2004, they were awarded a $24.9 million contract from the Naval Air Systems Command Weapons Division for engineering software support services provided to the Tactical Aircraft Electronic Warfare Integrated Program Team at Point Mugu, California and China Lake, California.

== Consumer electronics ==
ITT brand logo

Through their then subsidiary Schaub Elektrik Lorenz, ITT manufactured consumer products under the ITT Schaub-Lorenz brand, such as Touring radio receivers and Ideal Color television sets employing Heliochrom picture tubes.

Some television models feature the Ideal-Computer cartridge system, featuring a slot suitable for housing an ultrasonic remote control (acting as front panel buttons while docked), a teletext decoder, or Tele-Match video game dedicated consoles (unrelated to the "ITT Telematch Processor" console, a rebrand of the Fairchild Channel F); the Ideal-Computer system was licensed to other German producers of its time.

ITT Schaub-Lorenz was also behind the Digivision, the first television employing digital signal processing of the image.

For a comparable time span, ITT had also controlled and then fully absorbed English radio and television manufacturer Kolster-Brandes.

In 1986, throughout the following year, the ITT Telecommunications division (which included Schaub-Lorenz and Kolster-Brandes) was transferred to Alcatel through the French CGE, then in 1988, the consumer electronics division was further spun off and sold to Nokia, who sold some products under the ITT Nokia brand. Nokia closed their German TV factories in 1996, although their use of the ITT brand may have been discontinued earlier.

Since 2006, the ITT brand and logo have been licensed to the Karcher corporation, which is not part of the ITT group.

== Customers and programs ==
=== Federal Aviation Administration NextGen ===
In 2007, ITT was awarded a $207 million initial contract by the Federal Aviation Administration (FAA) to lead a team to develop and deploy the Automatic Dependent Surveillance – Broadcast (ADS-B) system. ADS-B is a key component of the FAA's NextGen air traffic control modernization program intended to increase safety and efficiency to meet the growing needs of air transportation. ITT is responsible for overall system integration and engineering and under contract options will operate and maintain the system after deployment through September 2025. The ITT team includes its partners AT&T, Thales North America, WSI, SAIC, PricewaterhouseCoopers, Aerospace Engineering, Sunhillo, Comsearch, MCS of Tampa, Pragmatics, Washington Consulting Group, Aviation Communications and Surveillance Systems (ACSS), Sandia Aerospace, and NCR Corporation.

=== GeoEye-1 ===
On September 6, 2008, the ITT-built imaging payload was launched aboard the GeoEye-1 satellite to provide high-resolution earth imaging. The satellite has the ability to collect images at 0.41-meter panchromatic (black and white) and 1.65-meter multispectral (color) resolution. GeoEye-1 can precisely locate an object to within three meters of its true location on the Earth's surface. The satellite will also be able to collect up to 700,000 square kilometers of panchromatic imagery per day.

== See also ==
- ITT Visual Information Solutions
- ITT Interconnect Solutions
- Top 100 US Federal Contractors
