= Condado Beach =

Beach in Puerto Rico

Coordinates: 18°27′36″N 66°4′41″W

Condado Beach Playa del Condado
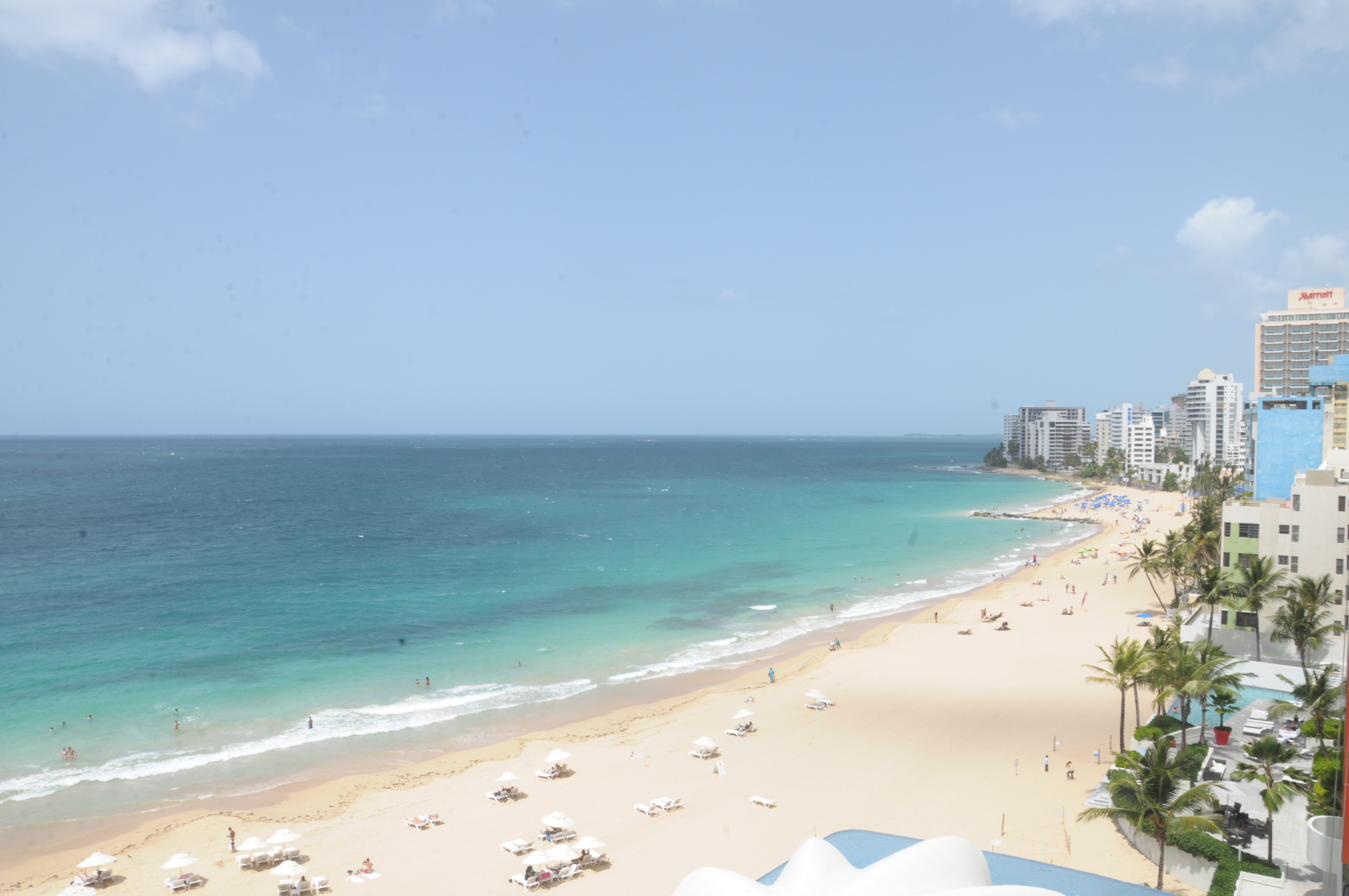
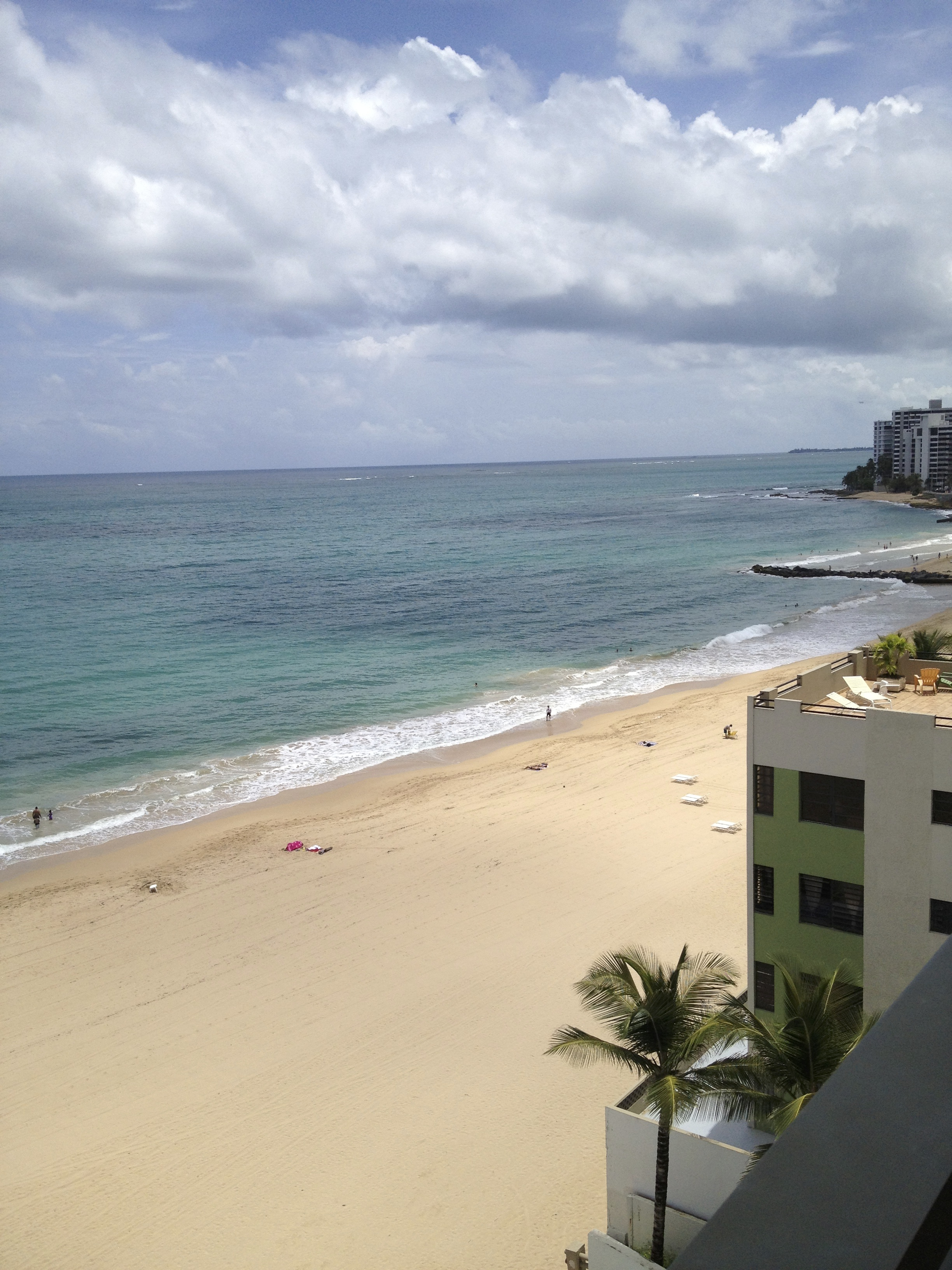
- Condado Beach from Vanderbilt and La Concha hotels
- Interactive map of Condado Beach
- Location in Puerto Rico
- Commonwealth: Puerto Rico
- Municipality: San Juan

Condado Beach (Spanish: Playa del Condado) is a large public-access beach located in Condado, a resort and residential district in the barrio of Santurce in the capital municipality of San Juan in Puerto Rico.

== Description ==
Condado Beach is located along the Atlantic coast of the San Juan barrio (district) of Santurce. The beach is named after Condado, itself a constituting subbarrio (sector) of Santurce, found directly to the east of the Islet of San Juan. The beach itself extends from La Ventana al Mar Park on Ashford Avenue in the west to Punta Piedrita in the east. Ocean Park Beach is located further east. A smaller beach, called Playita del Condado (Spanish for "Condado's small beach"), is located at the western edge of Condado, directly facing El Boquerón. It is considered an unpredictable beach with strong undercurrents, making it dangerous for swimmers who venture into deep water. In early 2022, the governor stated steps had to be taken to address the issue of multiple drownings there.

== Nearby locations ==
Condado Beach is located in a prime area for tourism and recreation. The beach is bordered by renown casinos and hotels such as La Concha Resort, the San Juan Marriott, and the historic Vanderbilt Hotel. Ashford Avenue, often referred to as the "Puerto Rican Fifth Avenue", hosts world-renowned brands such as Cartier, Louis Vuitton, Gucci and Salvatore Ferragamo, and Puerto Rican brands and high-end boutiques such as Nono Maldonado, Lisa Thon, Harry Robles and Ecliptica. The area also has numerous restaurants of different varieties, gift shops, and smaller inns. The part of the beach found at the end of Vendig Street is considered a popular gay neighborhood of El Condado.

== Gallery ==
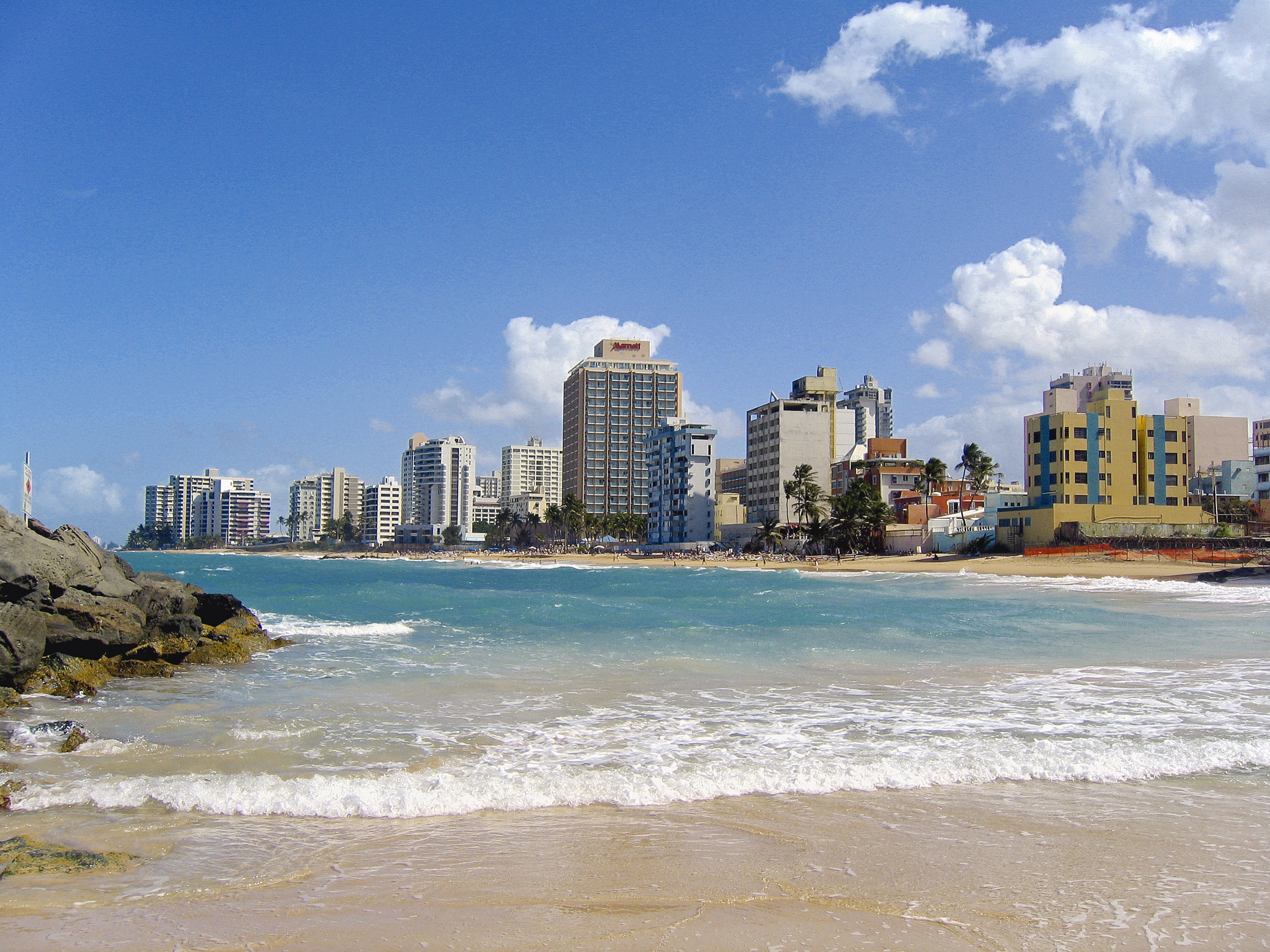
Western end of the beach from Ventana al Mar.

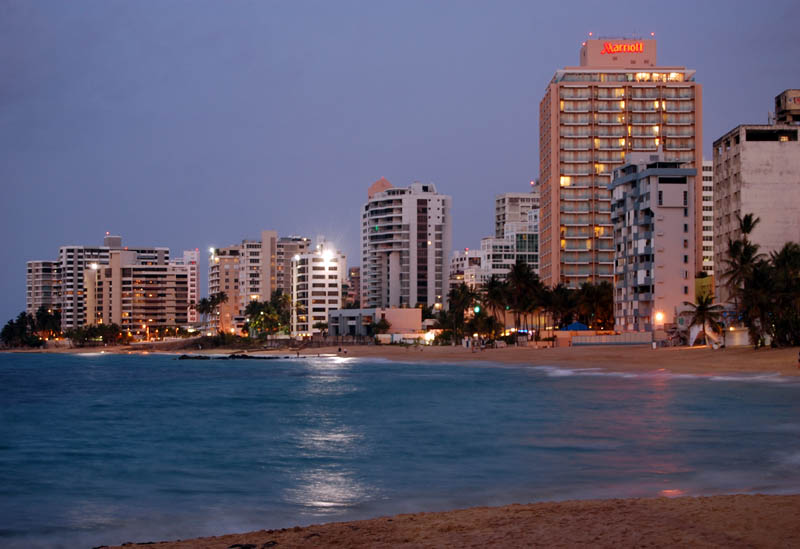
Condado Beach at night.

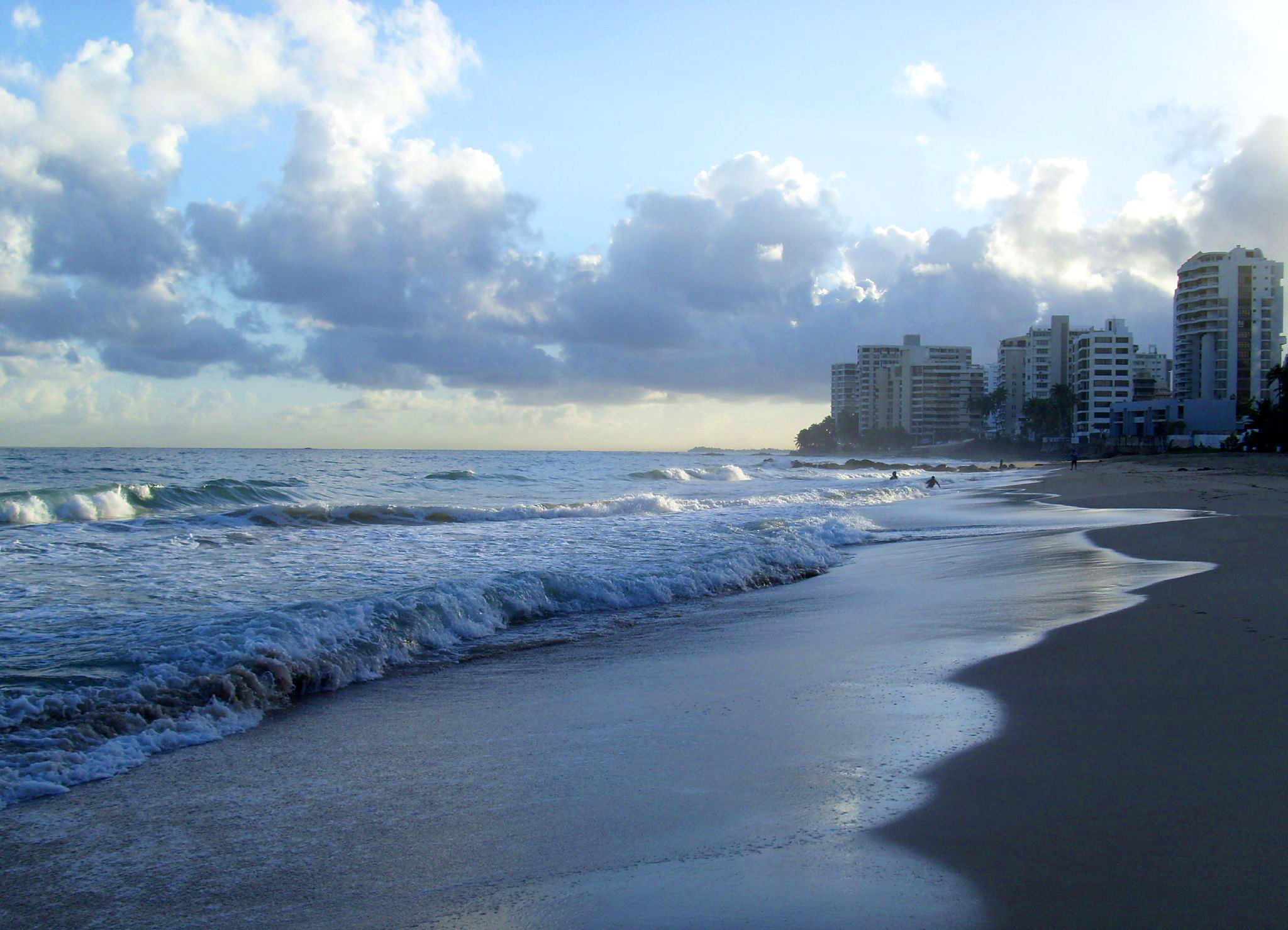
Eastern end of the beach.

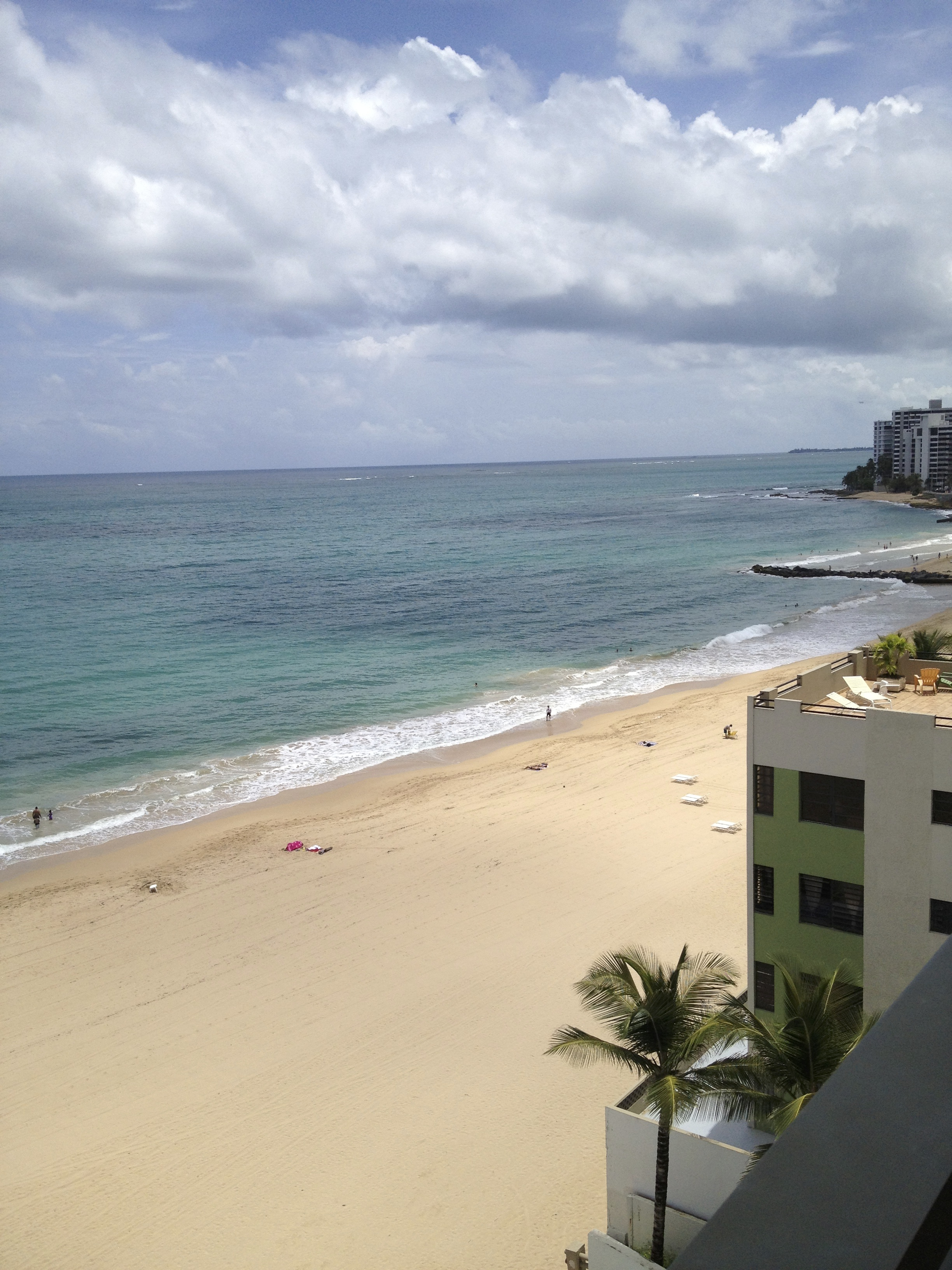
Condado Beach from one of the hotel towers.

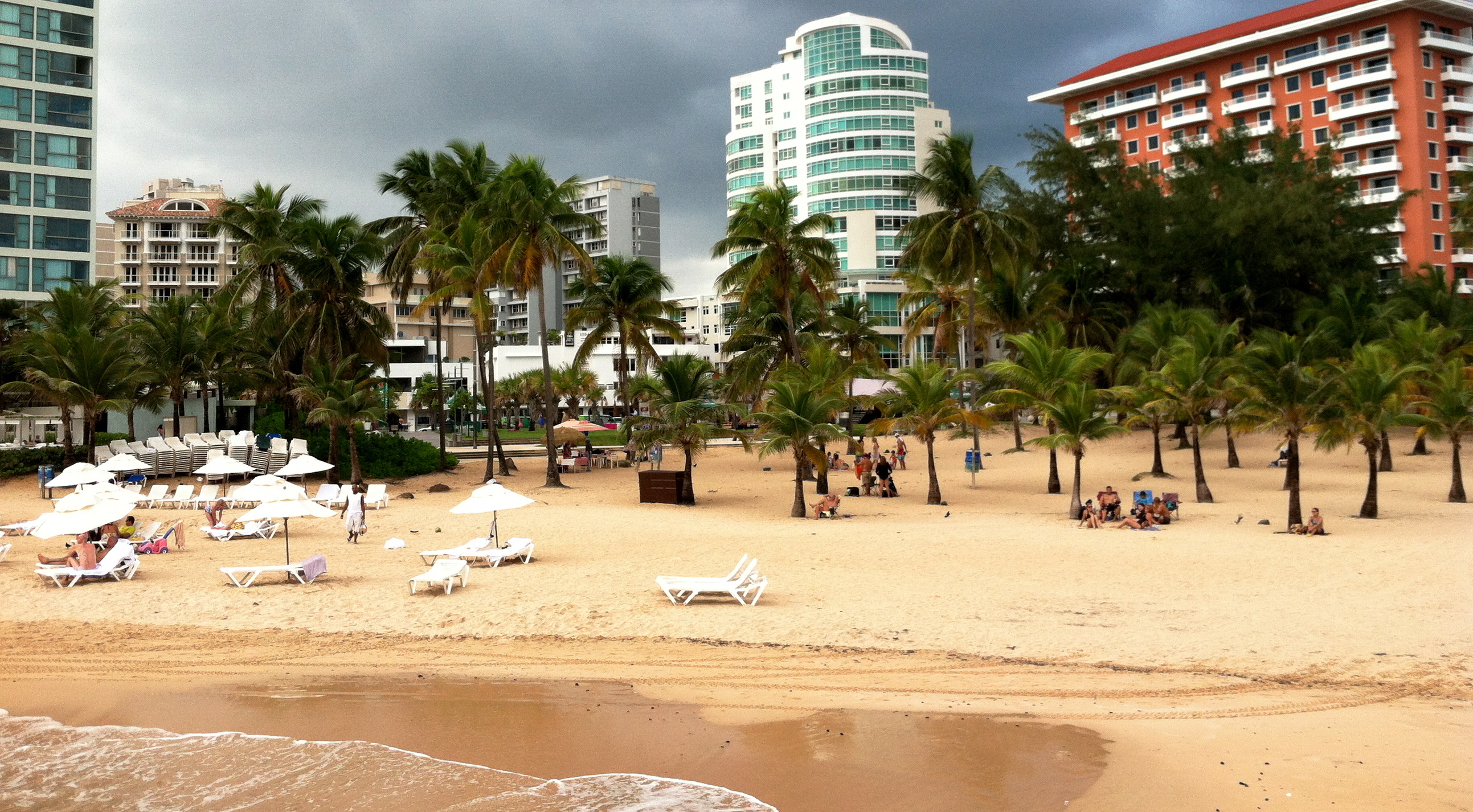
Beachfront by the Condado Vanderbilt.

== See also ==
- List of beaches in Puerto Rico
