= Condado (Santurce) =

Subbarrio of Santurce in San Juan, Puerto Rico

- Subbarrio
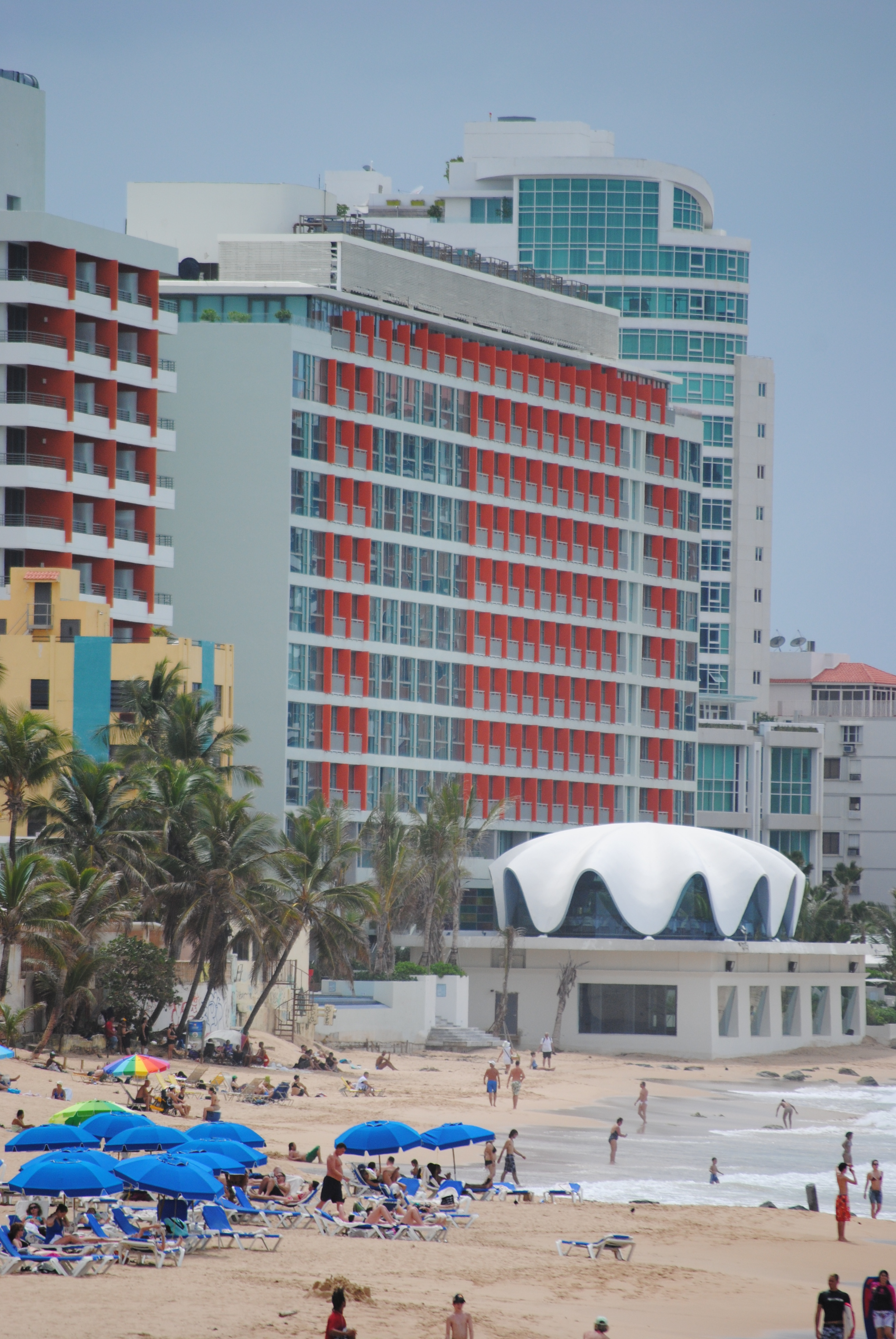
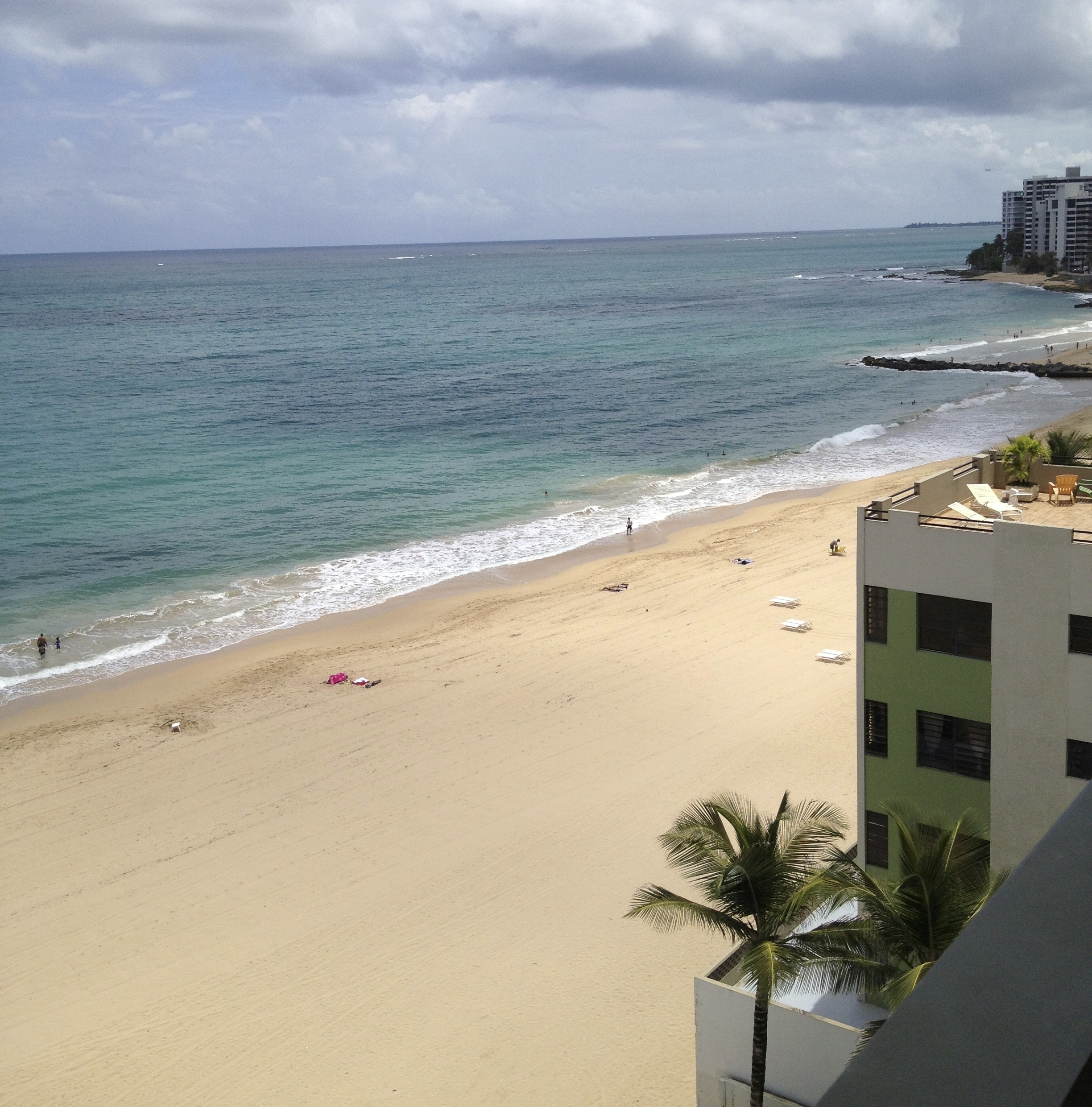
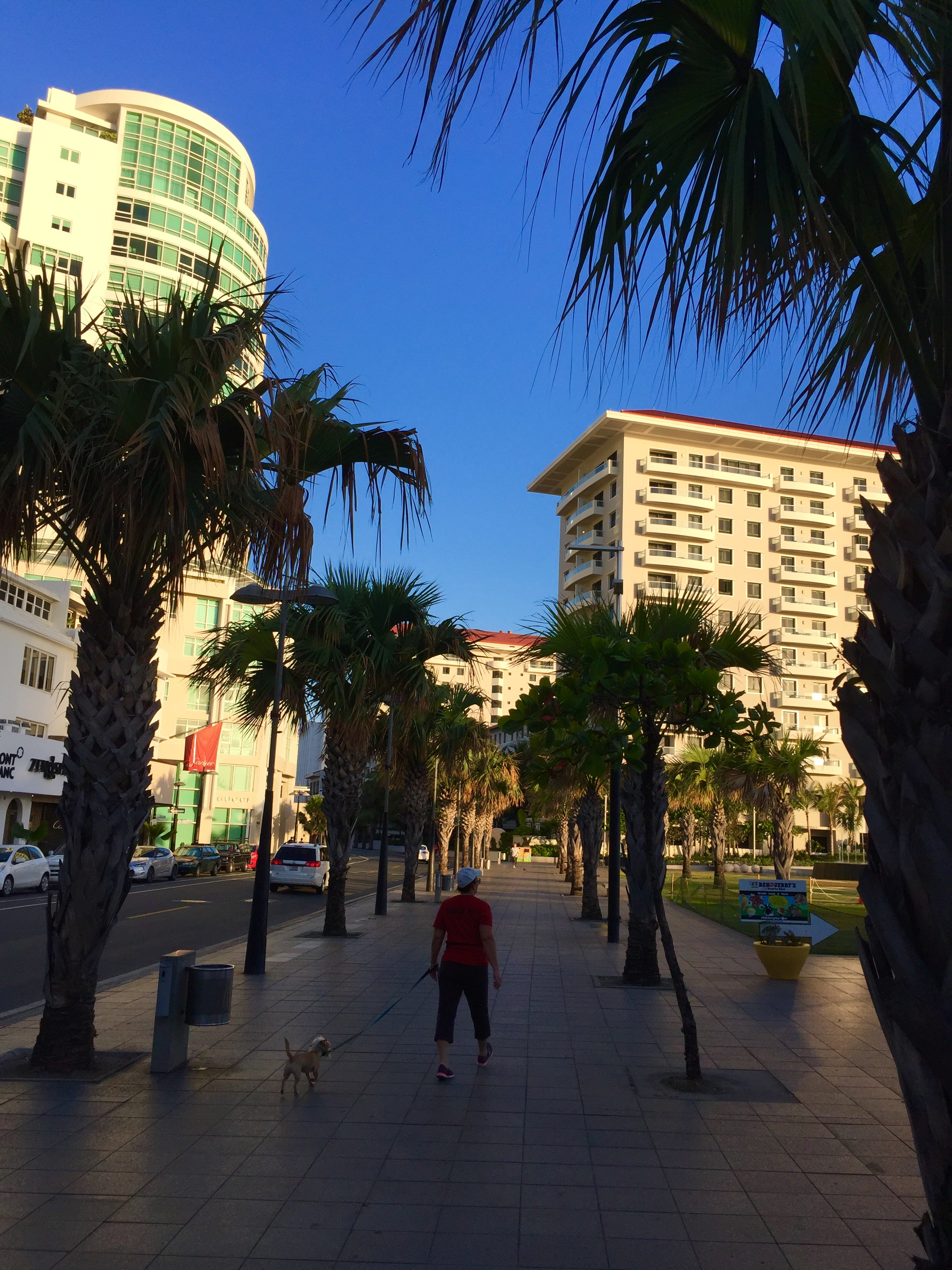
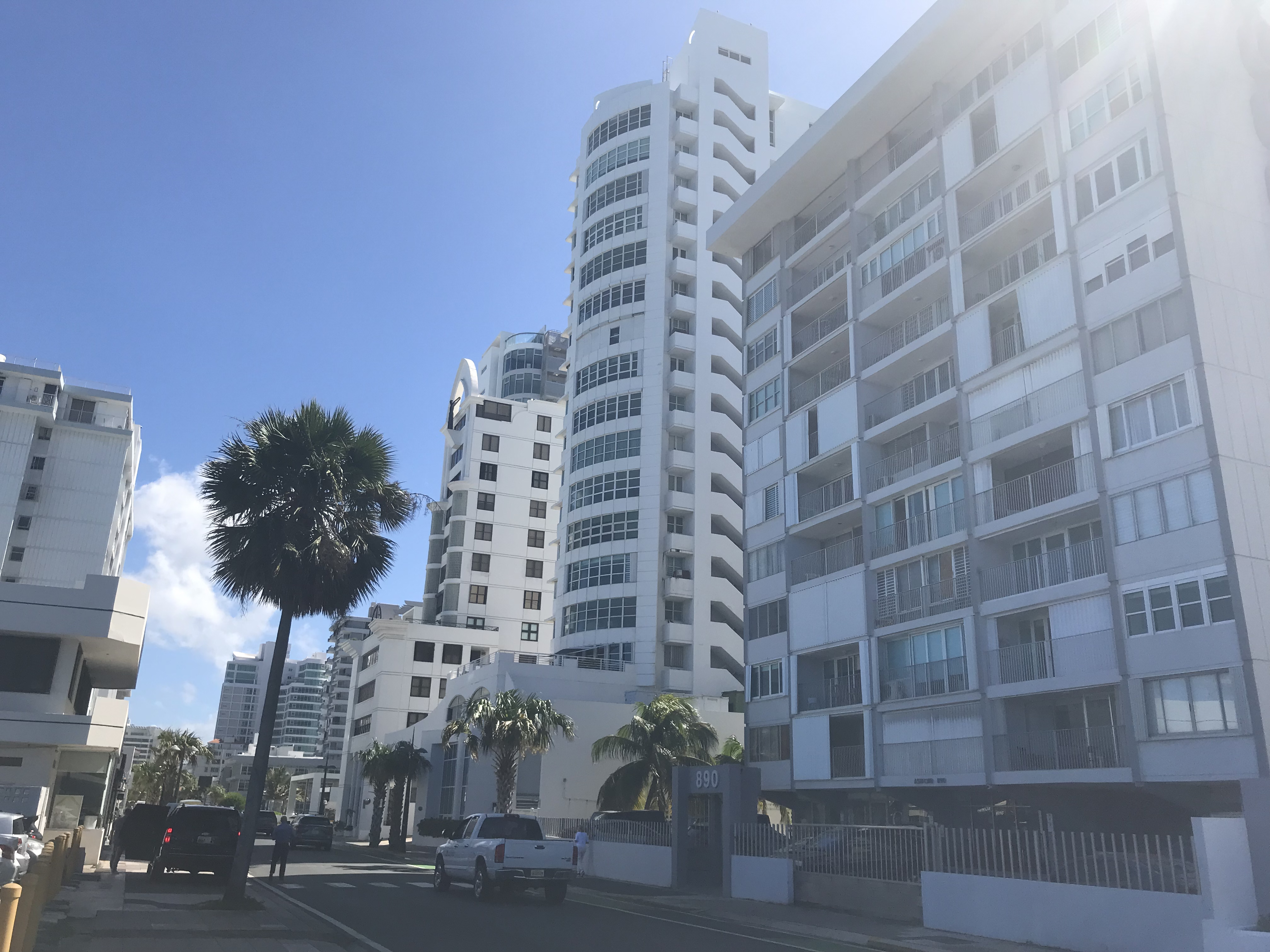
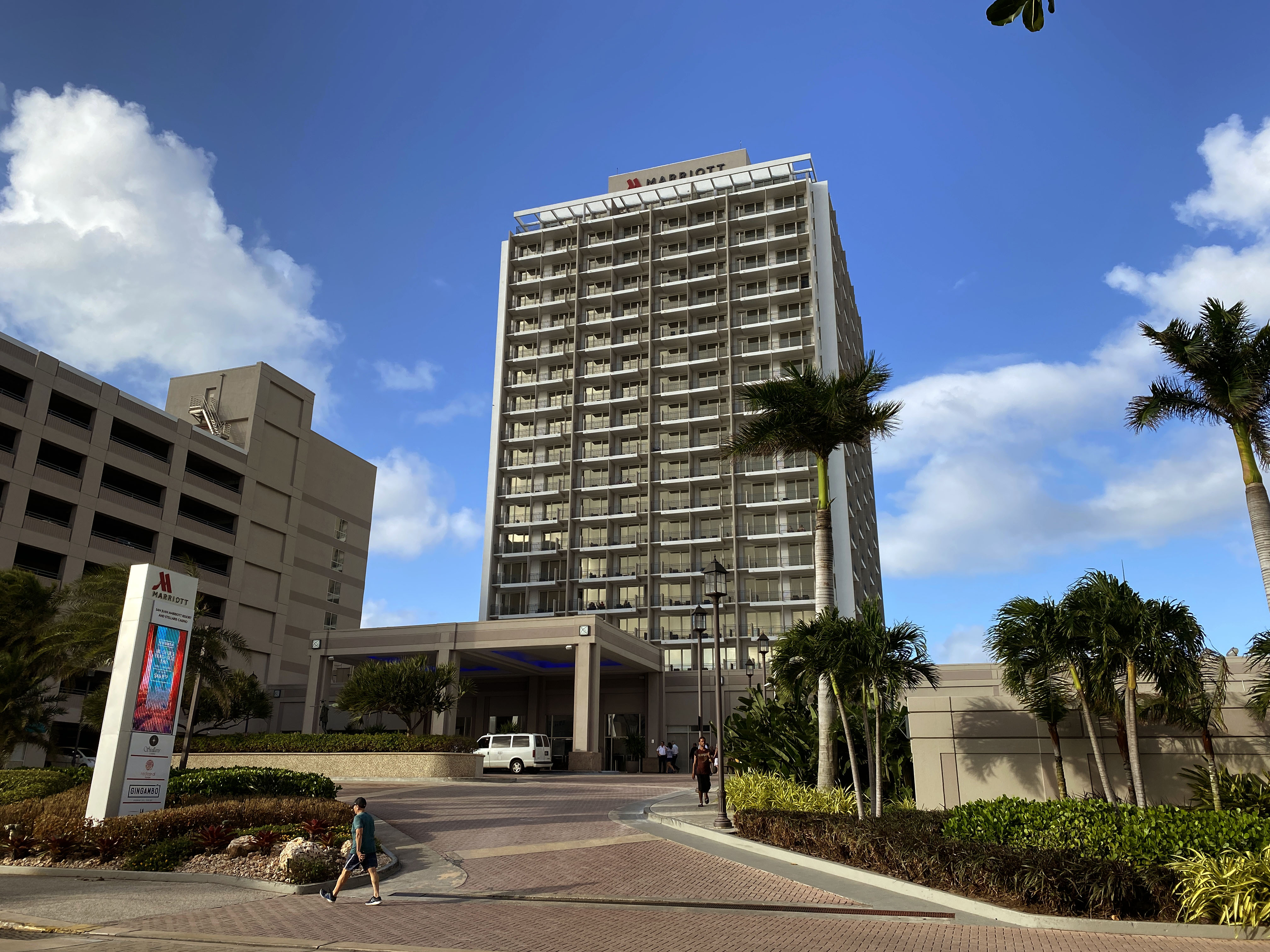
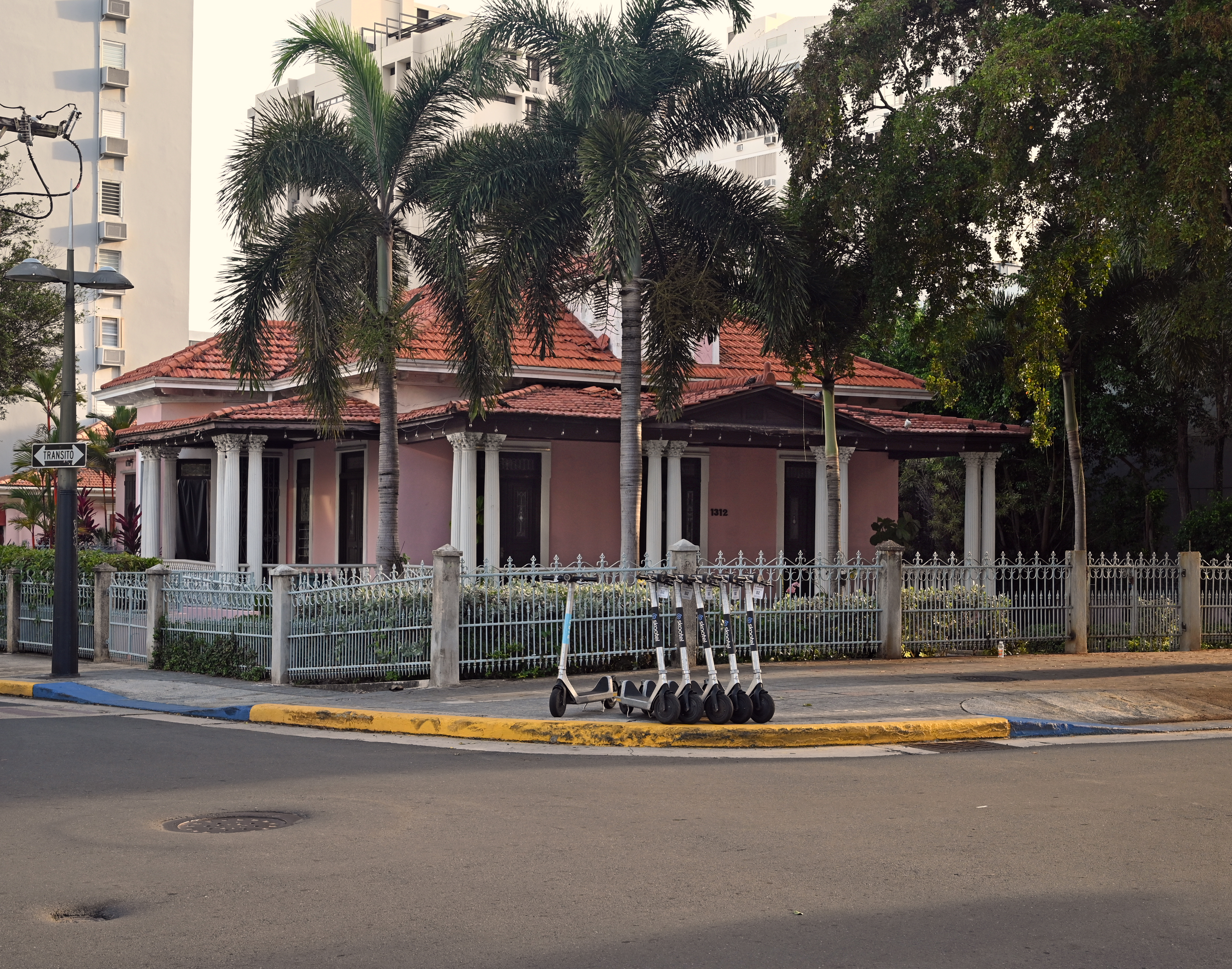
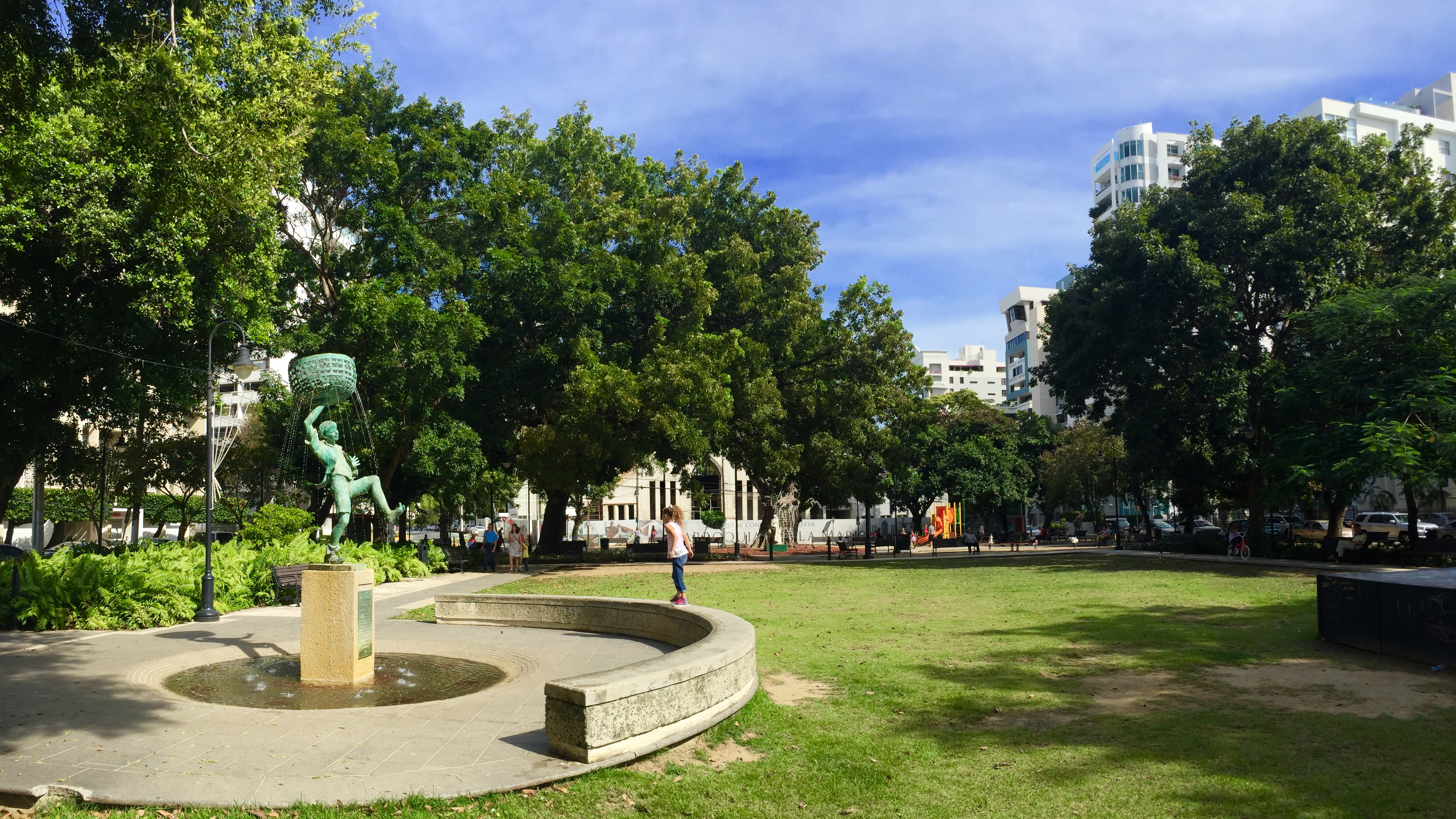
- Condado skyline from Caribe Hilton Hotel and San Gerónimo fort in San Juan Islet La Concha Resort Condado; Beach Vanderbilt Hotel (right) Condominiums Marriott Resort Ashford House Plaza Antonia Quiñones

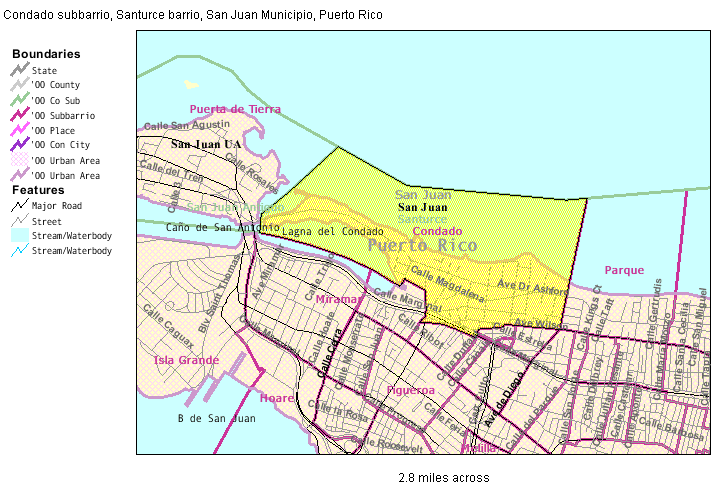
- Condado limits within Santurce barrio
- Interactive map of Condado
- Coordinates: 18°27′20″N 66°04′16″W
- Commonwealth: Puerto Rico
- Municipality: San Juan
- Barrio: Santurce

Area
  - Total: .79 sq mi (2.0 km^{2})
  - Land: .48 sq mi (1.2 km^{2})
  - Water: .31 sq mi (0.80 km^{2})
- Elevation: 0 ft (0 m)

Population (2010)
  - Total: 4,908
  - Density: 15,832.3/sq mi (6,112.9/km^{2})
- Source: 2010 Census
- Time zone: UTC−4 (AST)

Condado (Spanish for ''county'') is a highly urbanized beachfront resort, commercial, and residential district with various upscale hotels, restaurants, boutique shops, and condos in the barrio of Santurce in San Juan, the capital city and municipality of Puerto Rico. Located about 2 to 6 miles (3.2 to 9.7 km) from the Old San Juan historic quarter, San Juan Cruise Port, Isla Verde resort area, Hato Rey business center, and SJU airport, the district is centered around Ashford Avenue, which extends east–west for about 1.77 miles (2.85 km) from the Parque and Ocean Park residential areas to Dos Hermanos Bridge in San Juan Islet, where Old San Juan is situated.

Situated in an area known as Condado since the 18th century, Condado remained largely vacant until the turn of the 20th century. Its real estate development began with the construction of the Ashford Presbyterian Community Hospital in 1904 by Grace Williams Atkins, Casa Mora (Moor House) in 1909 and Dos Hermanos Bridge in 1910 by Hernand and Sosthenes Behn, "Condado" passenger electric tramway in 1911 by Porto Rico Railway, Light & Power Co. (PRRL&P), Ashford House in 1912 by Bailey Ashford, and Vanderbilt Hotel in 1919 by Frederick Vanderbilt.

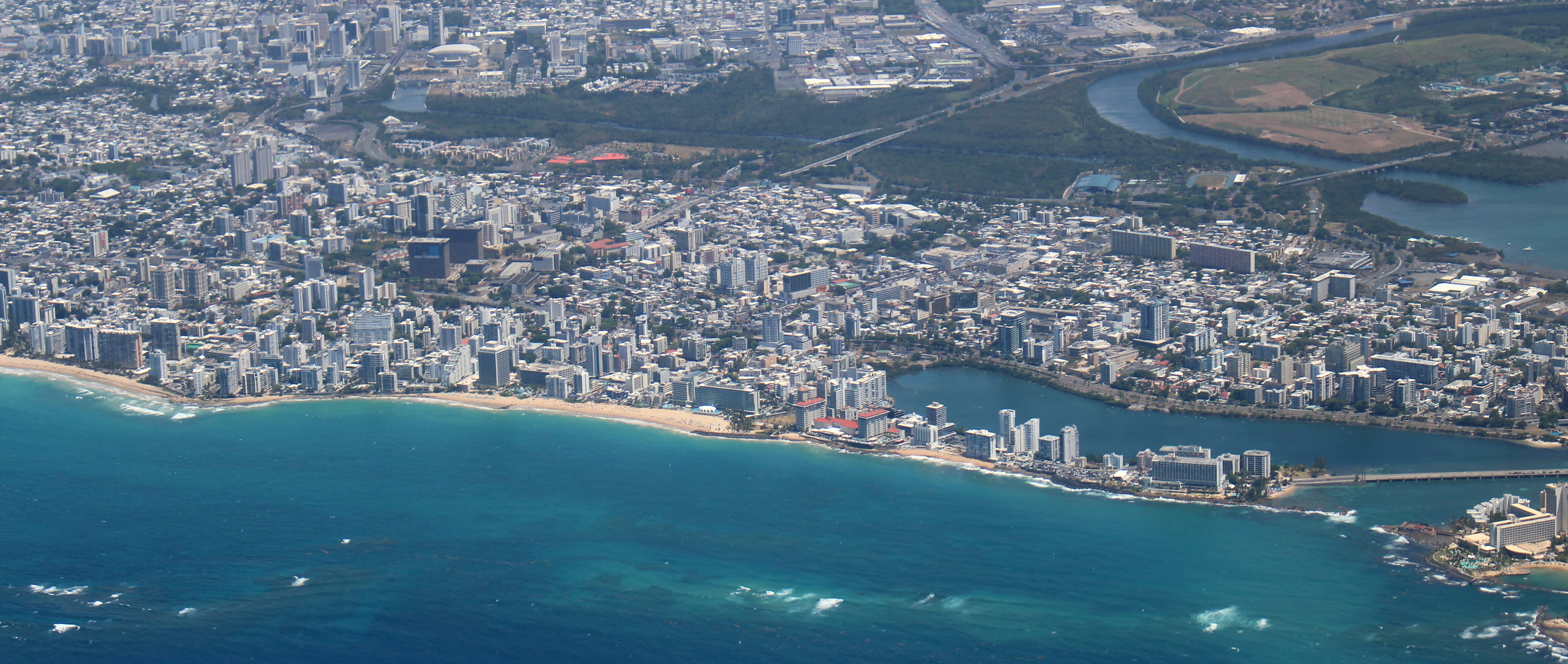
Condado (foreground) from San Juan Islet (right) to Parque district (left), 2016

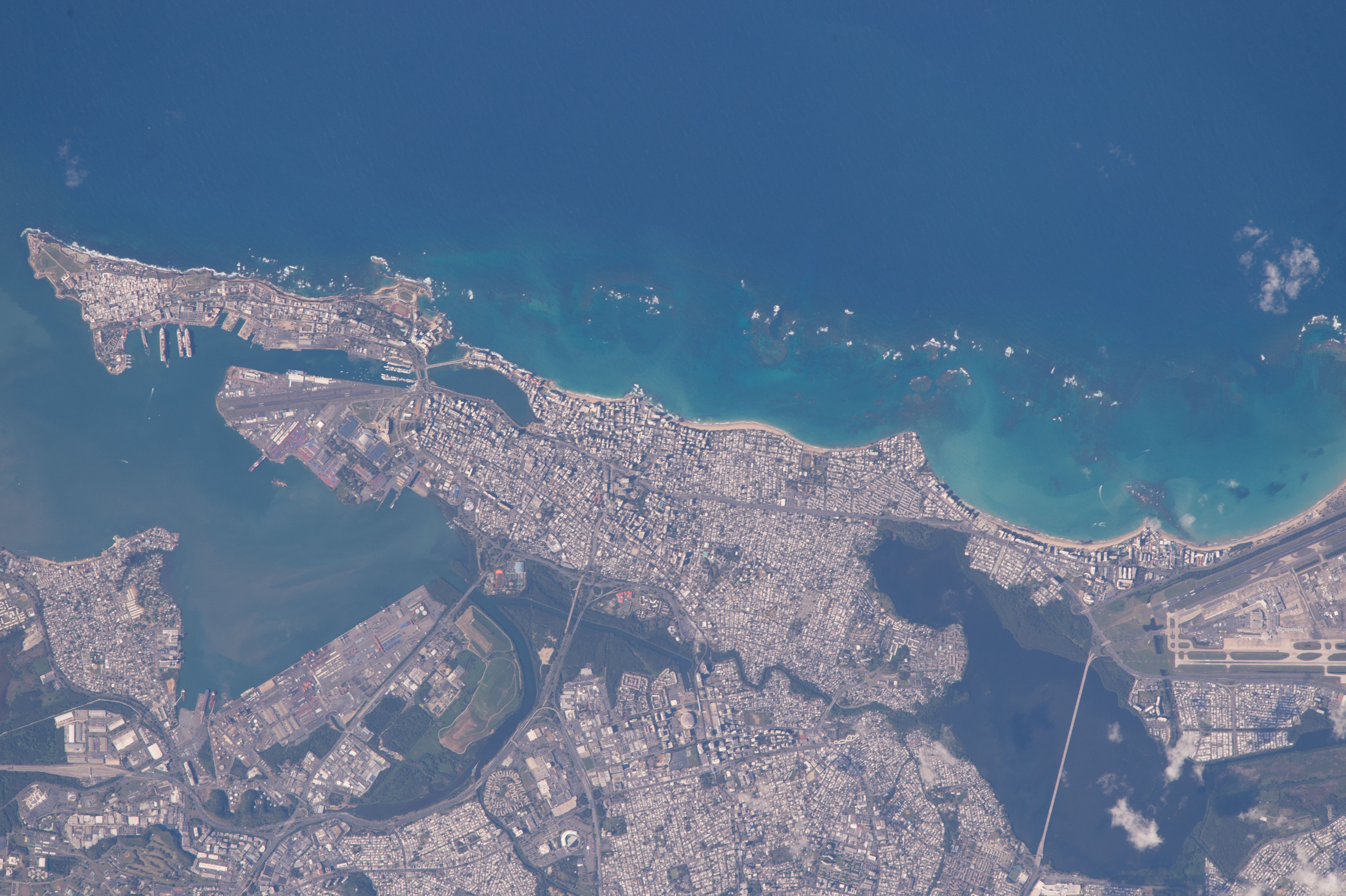
Satellite view from Old San Juan historic quarter (upper left) in San Juan Islet in the San Juan capital municipality to Isla Verde resort area (upper right) in the Carolina municipality with Condado visible (upper right-center), 2016

== Location ==
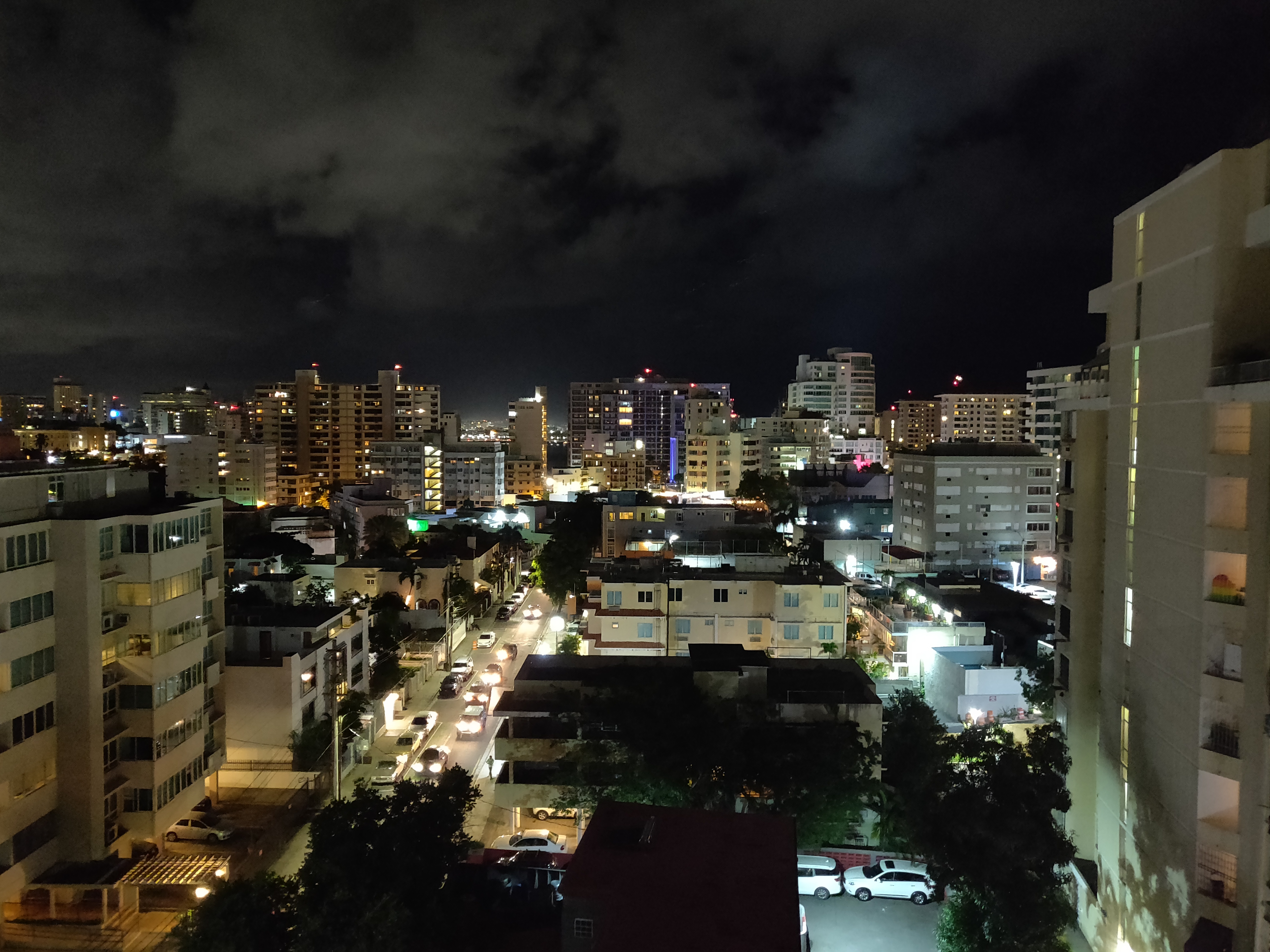
Inner Condado skyline at night, 2020

Condado is an upscale neighborhood located on the beach. It lies 2 miles (3.2 km) east of the historic district of Old San Juan, which is situated on San Juan Islet. It is one of the 40 subbarrios of Santurce. The land area measures 203.81 acres (82.48 ha) with a resident population of 6,170 according to the 2000 United States census.

The eastern border is marked by De Diego Avenue and its straight extension towards the Atlantic coast. On the south, the subbarrio is bounded by Wilson Street, Aldea Street, Baldorioty de Castro Expressway, Piccioni Street and Delcasse Street, and by the Condado Lagoon (from east to west). At the westernmost point is the Dos Hermanos Bridge, where Ashford Avenue ends and leads into Old San Juan. In the north are the beaches of the Atlantic Ocean next to hotels and other attractions such as nightclubs, casinos, shops and restaurants. Condado is one of the island's primary tourist destinations.

== History ==
=== 20th century ===
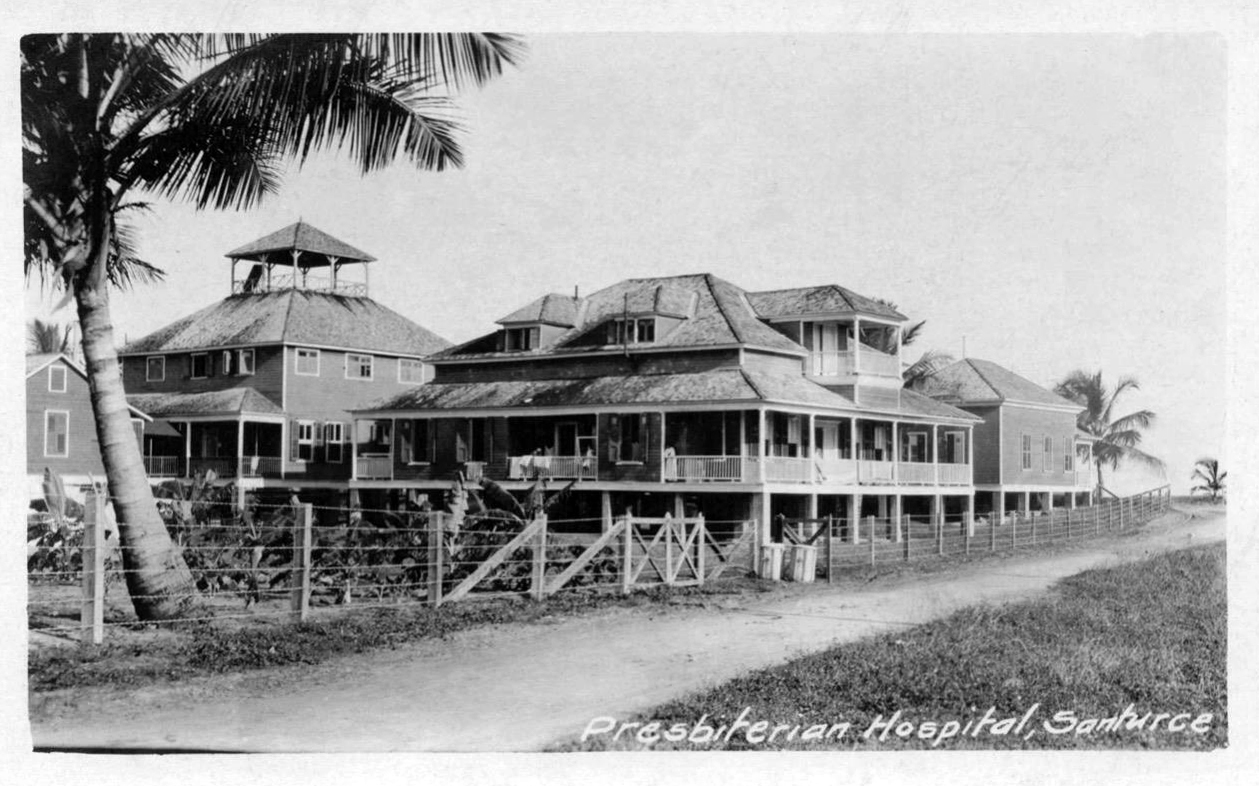
Presbyterian Hospital, today the Ashford Presbyterian Community Hospital, c. 1915

Condado began its process of urbanization in 1908 by two American industrialists, Hernan and Sosthenes, also known as the Behn Brothers. The quarter became a typical streetcar suburb to the traditional urban center of Old San Juan. Its growth and development was mostly shaped by a transportation influenced suburbanization developed on a grid plan.

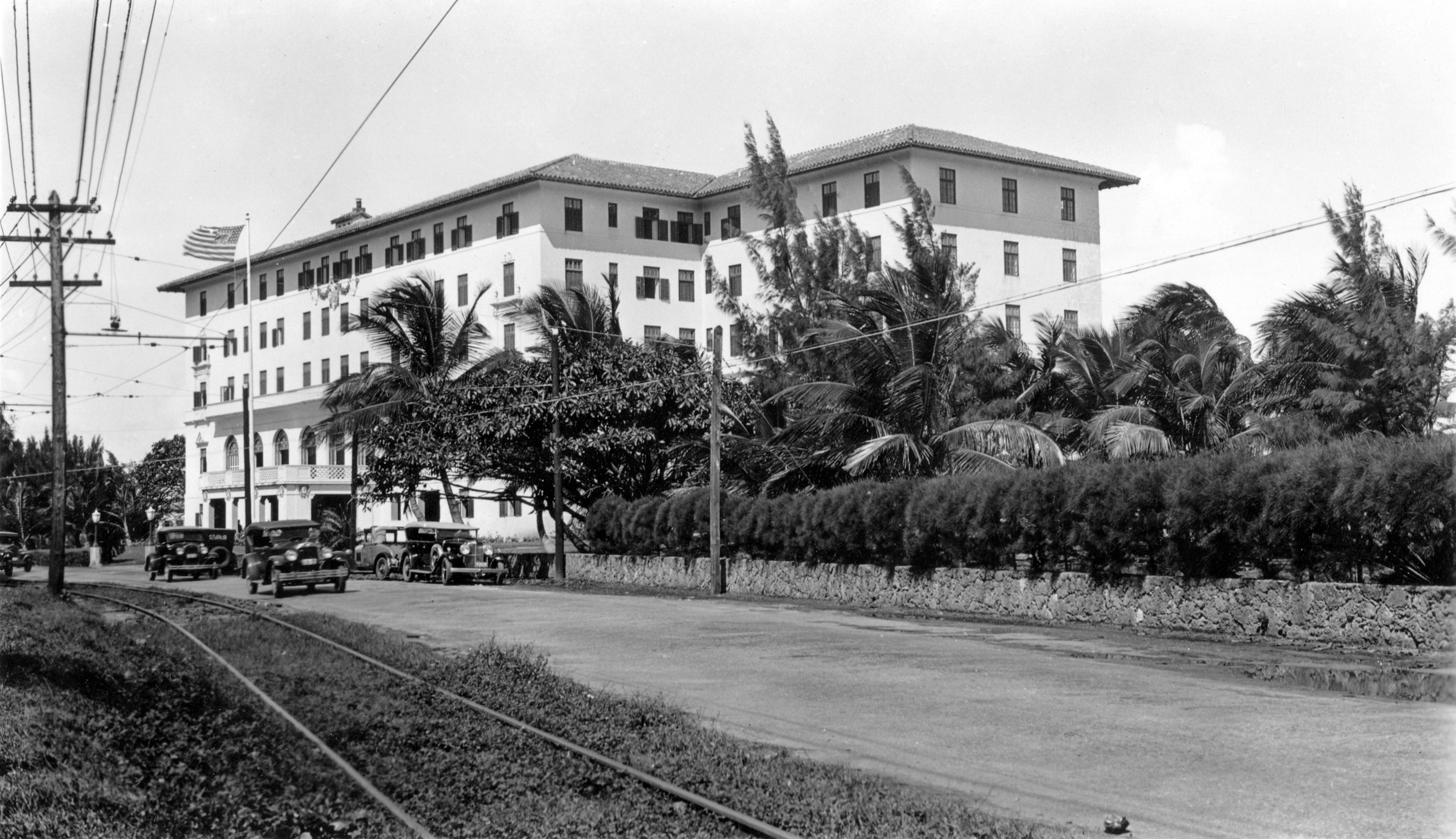
The Condado Vanderbilt Hotel from "Condado" passenger electric tramway, 1932

The neighborhood experienced an economic boom in the first decades of the 20th century when some of the wealthiest families built their homes in the area. The Vanderbilts built a summer home in 1919 which today has been converted into the luxurious Condado Vanderbilt Hotel. The Behn Brothers also built their home in Condado and to their memory, Puente Dos Hermanos (or "Two Brothers Bridge" in English) is named in their honor as founders of Puerto Rico Telephone and the new electric tramway line that linked the county to Old San Juan.

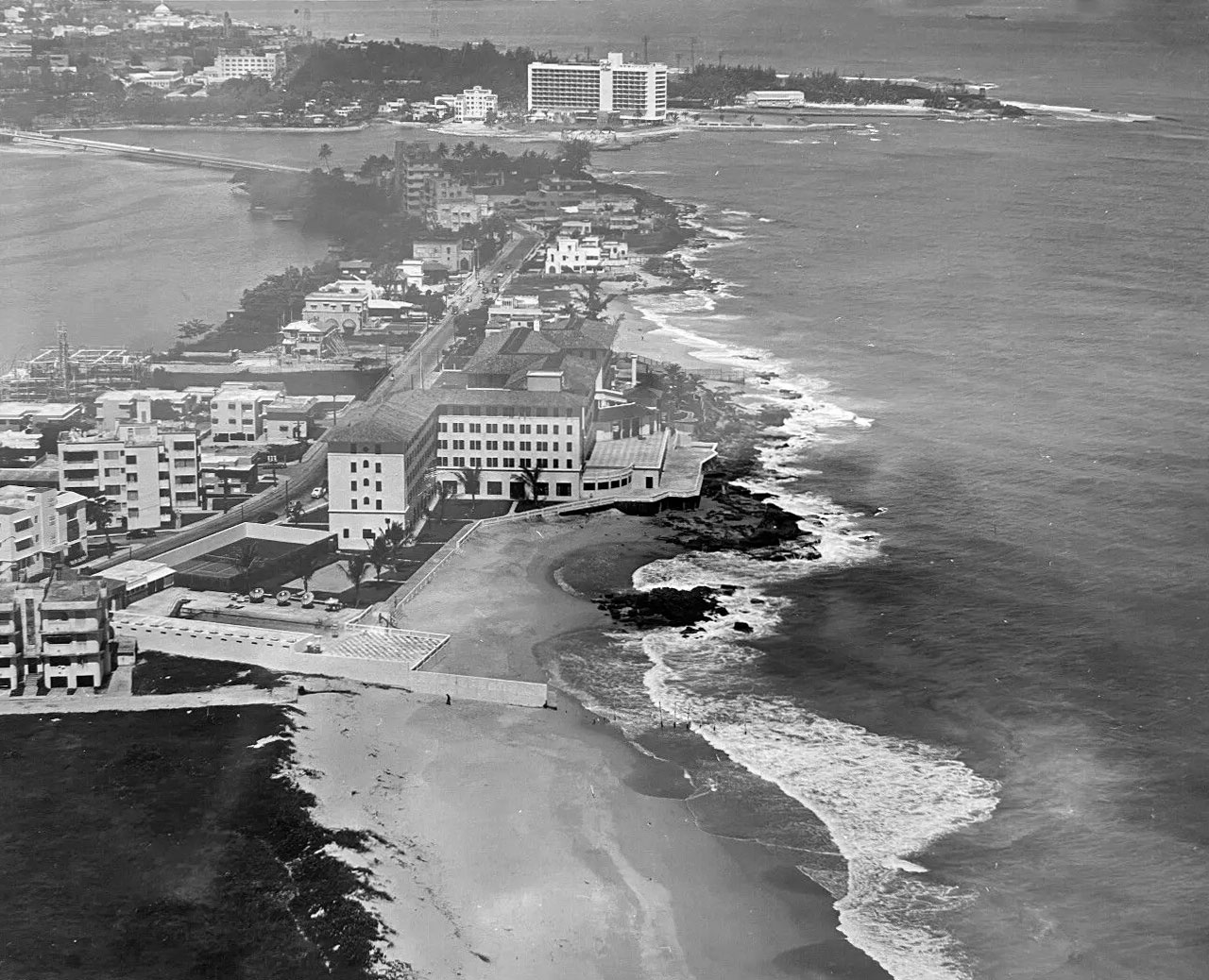
Western end of Condado towards San Juan Islet with Condado Vanderbilt (foreground) and Caribe Hilton (background) Hotels visible, c. 1950

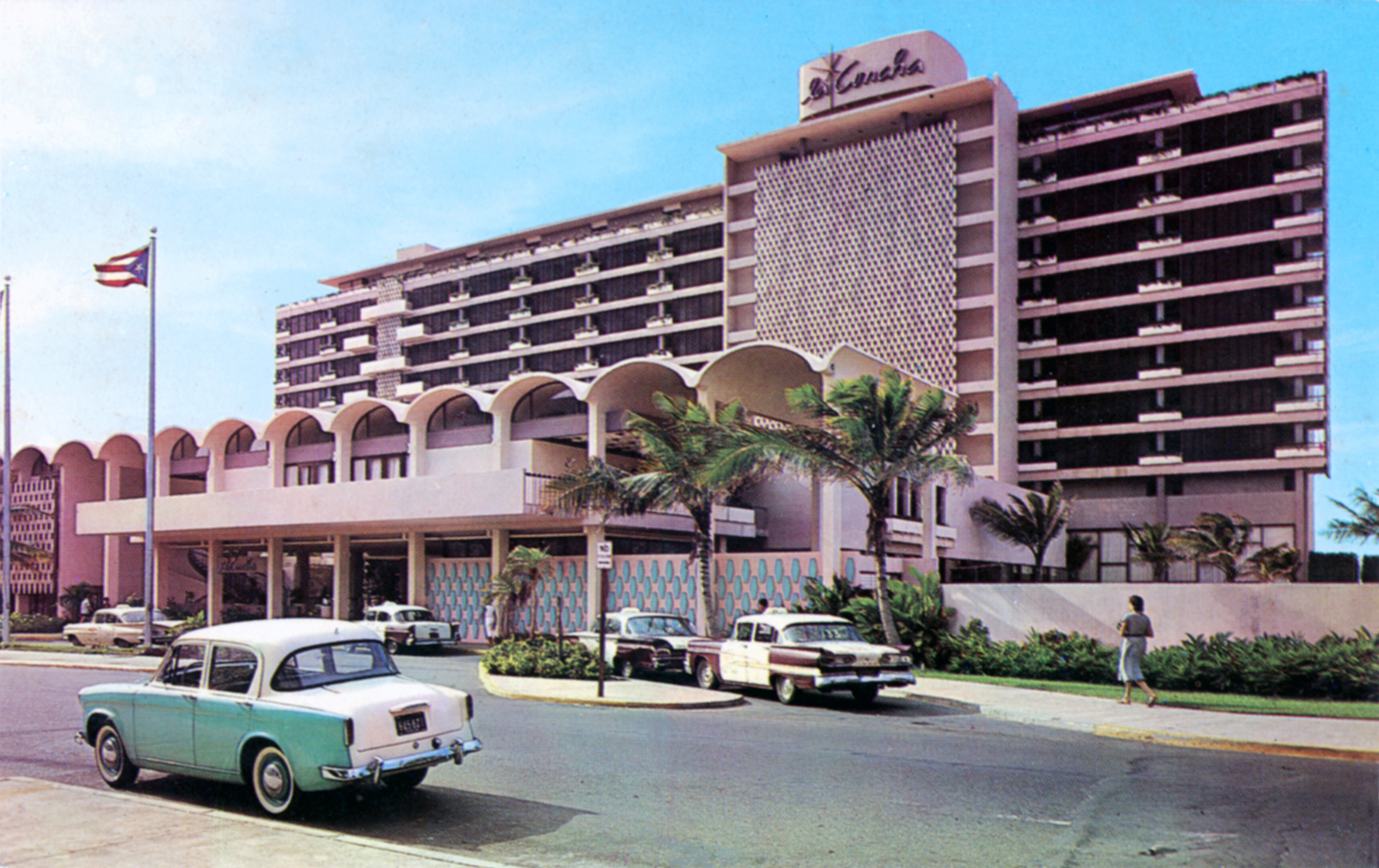
La Concha Hotel, today La Concha Resort, next to Condado Vanderbilt Hotel, c. 1959

The 1950s-60s era saw another boom in Condado, with the rapid industrialization of Puerto Rico, this flamboyant locale was becoming a popular tourist destination. Large hotels like the Caribe Hilton Hotel and La Concha Resort were built as part of a government sponsorship program under the Operation Bootstrap brand. A convention center was built to host activities while many families began to move in during the development of high-end and high-rise apartment buildings. In fact, Ashford Avenue was named after another well-known Condado resident Dr. Bailey Ashford. It runs through the subbarrio and leads toward the Puente Dos Hermanos.

=== 21st century ===
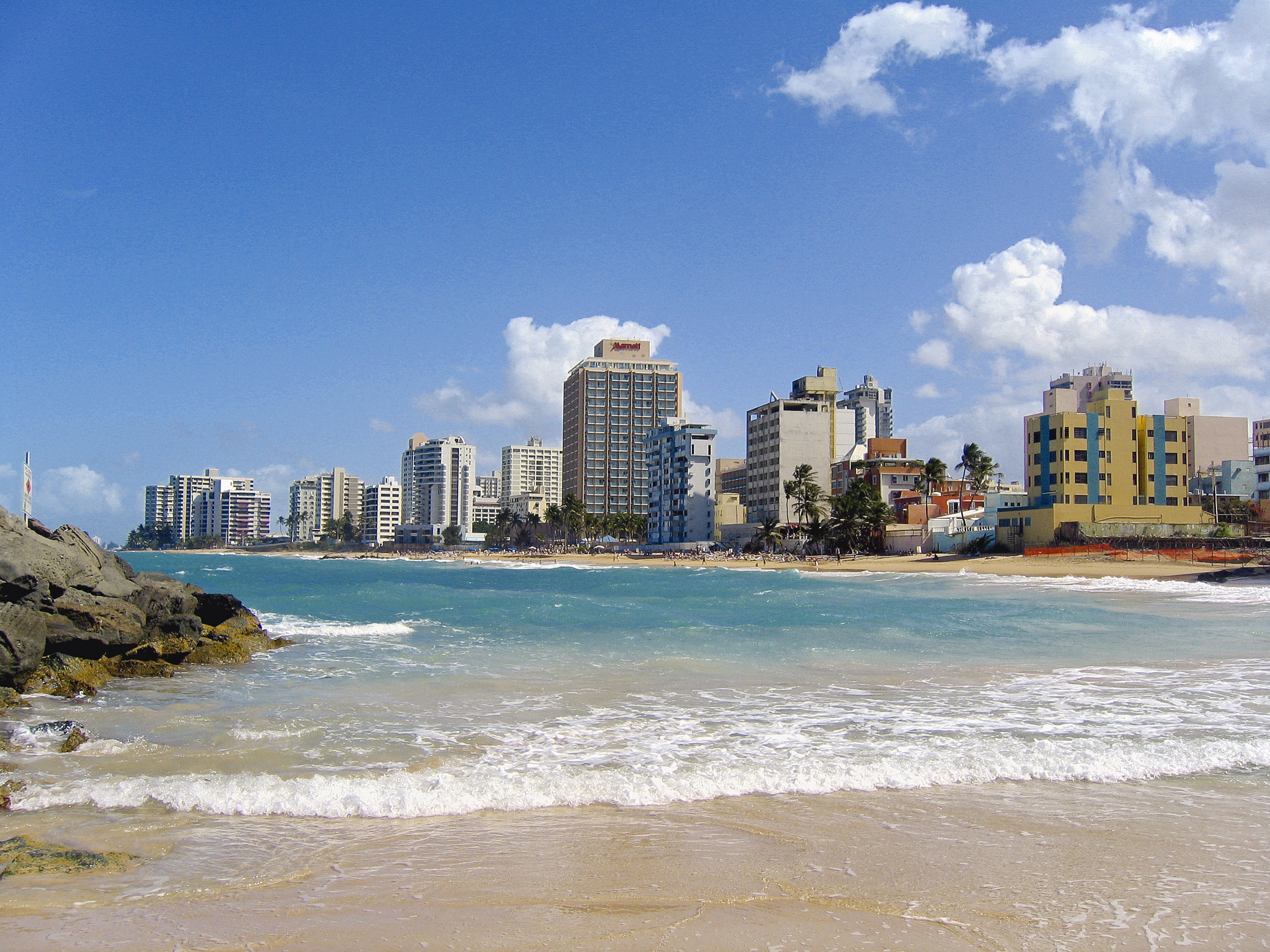
Condado beachfront skyline, 2004

Condado looks quite different from what it did at the turn of the century. Some of the luxurious homes which still remain nestled between the high-rise condominiums have been converted into small inns, shops, museums or restaurants. Dr. Bailey Ashford's home has been remodeled and there are plans to turn it into a museum. Condado's main public space is La Ventana al Mar, designed by architect and urbanist Andrés Mignucci. The park is flanked by two of Condado's landmark hotels: to the west by the Condado Vanderbilt Hotel (1919), designed by Warren and Whitmore, and to the east by the La Concha Hotel (1957), designed by Toro Ferrer. One of the first schools constructed by the United States is in Condado. Designed by Antonin Nechodoma, it was designated as a historic site in November 2020 by the Puerto Rico Planning Board.

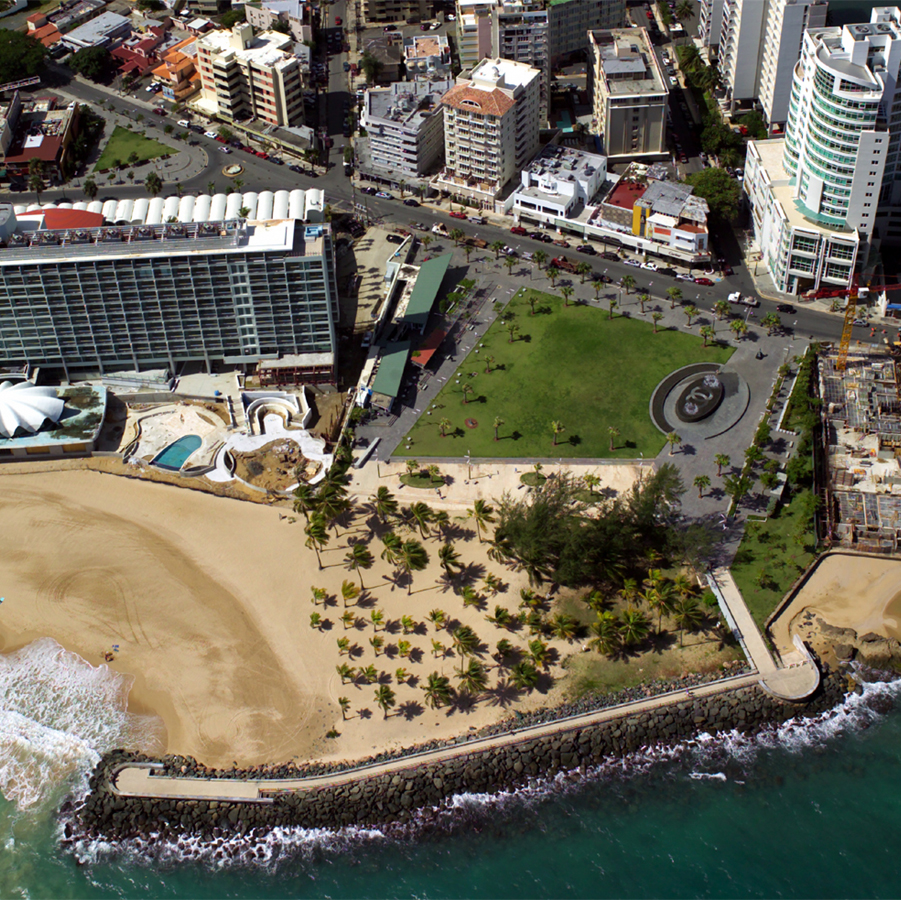
La Ventana al Mar public square, 2007

In recent years, Condado has developed into one of San Juan's higher-priced residential and commercial districts. Property values in the area are generally higher than in many other parts of Puerto Rico, reflecting limited availability and strong demand.

== Demographics ==
In 2010, Condado had a population of 4,908 and a population density of 15,832.3 persons per square mile.

Historical population
Census	Pop.	Note	%±
1940	2,470		—
1950	3,336		35.1%
1960	3,371		1.0%
1970	4,605		36.6%
1980	5,575		21.1%
1990	5,582		0.1%
2000	6,170		10.5%
2010	4,908		−20.5%
U.S. Decennial Census; 1930-1950 1980-2000 2010

== Infrastructure ==
=== Public transportation ===
Condado is served by the Puerto Rico Metropolitan Bus Authority with two bus routes: T21 and D53.

== Gallery ==
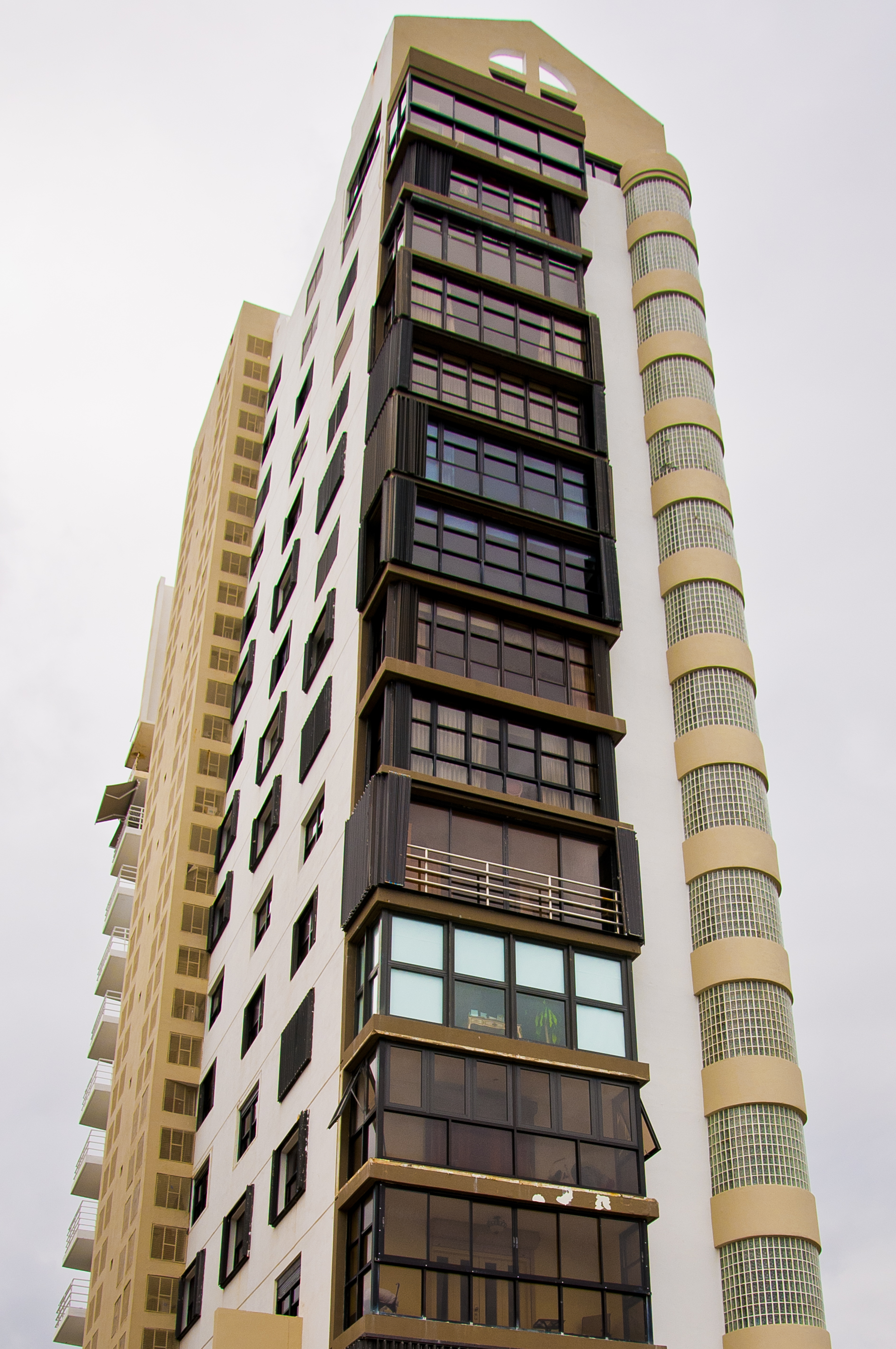
Building on Ashford Avenue

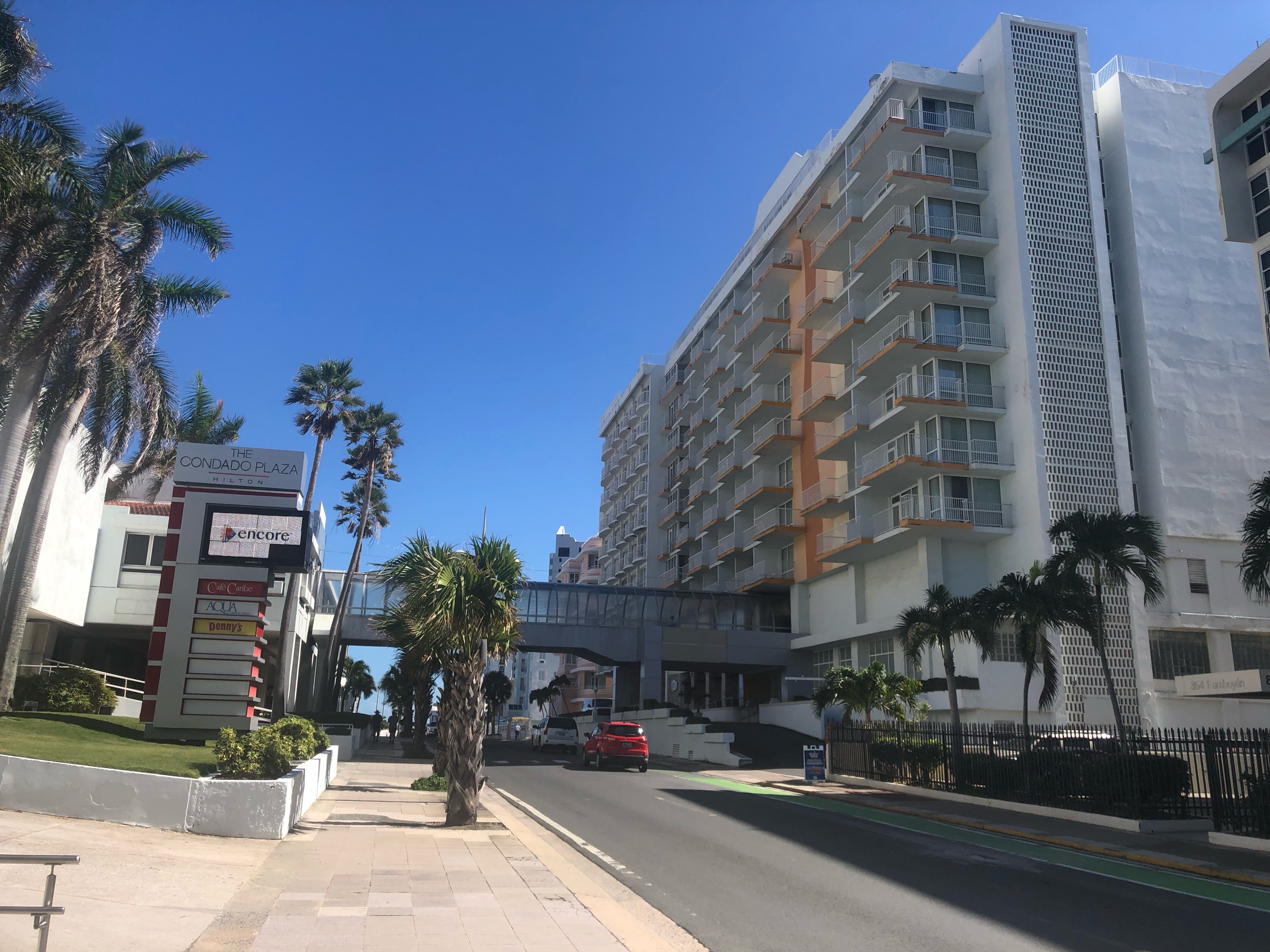
Condado Plaza Hotel (left) and Hilton Garden Inn (right) on Ashford Avenue

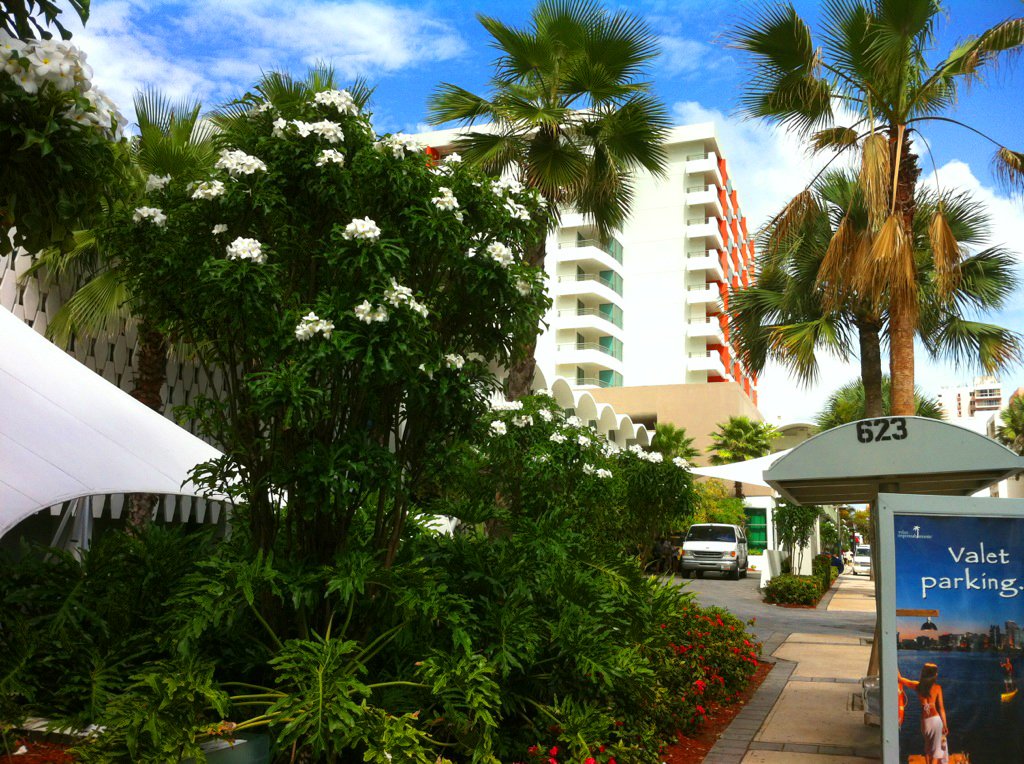
La Concha Hotel

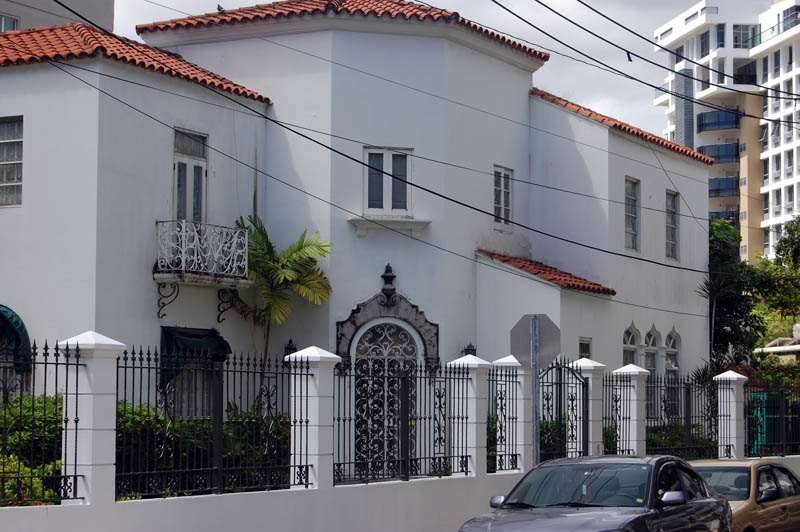
Home in Condado

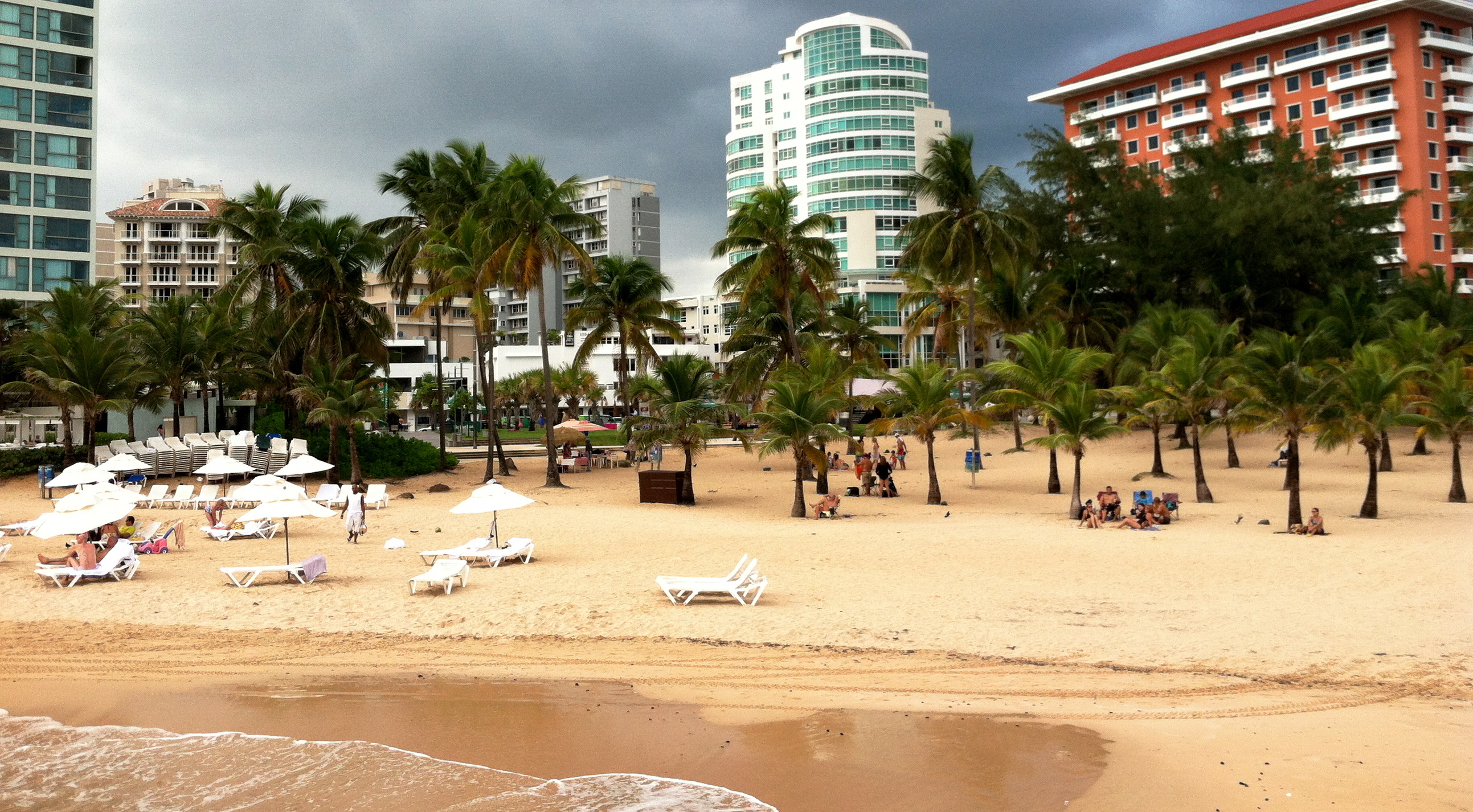
Condado Beach at La Concha Hotel

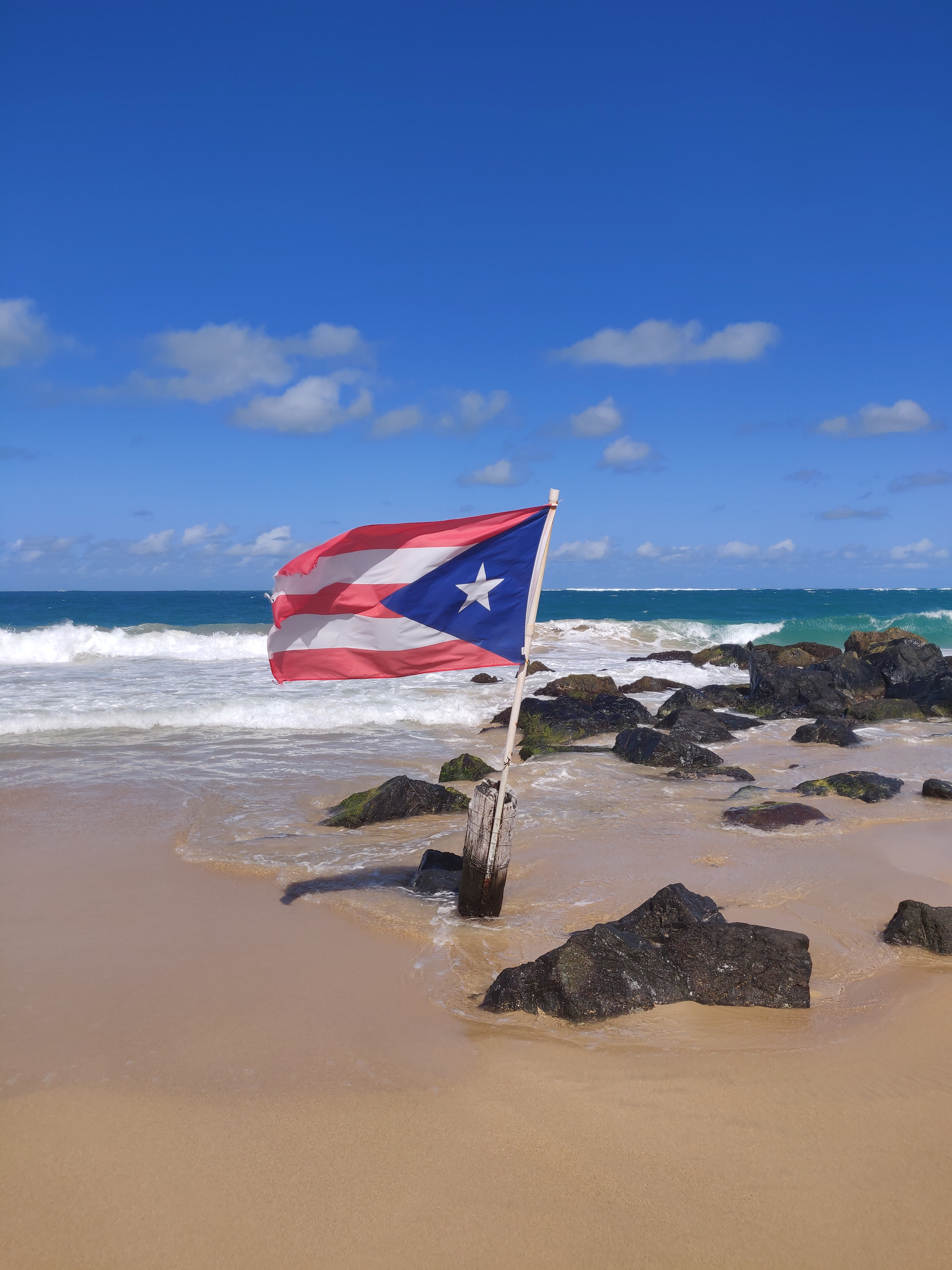
Flag of Puerto Rico on Condado Beach

== See also ==
- Condado Beach
- List of communities in Puerto Rico
