= Mario Salvadori =

American engineer and architect

Mario G. Salvadori
- Born: March 19, 1907; Rome, Italy
- Died: June 25, 1997 (aged 90); Manhattan, New York, U.S.
- Education: University of Rome (doctorates in civil engineering, mathematics)
- Spouse(s): Giuseppina Tagliacozzo, Carol Bookman
- Children: Vieri Salvadori (son); Michael Kazin (stepson)
- Parent(s): Riccardo Salvadori, Ermelinda Alatri
- Engineering career
- Discipline: Civil engineering Structural engineering Forensic engineering
- Institutions: Columbia University; Salvadori Center
- Awards: Hoover Medal (1993); Founders Award (1997, National Academy of Engineering)

Mario G. Salvadori (March 19, 1907 – June 25, 1997) was an American structural engineer and professor of both civil engineering and architecture at Columbia University.

== Early life ==
Salvadori was born in Rome, Italy in 1907. His father, Riccardo, an engineer who worked for the telephone company, became the chief engineer of the city of Genoa when the phone company merged with their French counterpart. Salvadori's father later became the head of the gas and electric company in Spain. His mother, Ermelinda Alatri, belonged to a rich Jewish family. Following his father's activities, Salvadori spent many years of his youth in Madrid and only returned to Italy in 1923. Two years later, when he was 18, he started what was the first student jazz band in Italy; one of his youthful dreams was to become a concert conductor, although his parents did not encourage this. He was also a skillful mountain climber; he found several new climbing routes on Dolomites.

He earned doctoral degrees in both civil engineering and mathematics from the University of Rome in 1930 and 1933, respectively. Then he served as an instructor at Engineering department of the University of Rome and as consultant for Istituto Nazionale per le Applicazioni del Calcolo (INAC), directed by Mauro Picone, his mathematics teacher. Thanks to a grant, he went to London and in the next two years he did graduate research in photoelasticity at University College London, where he was in contact with Jews escaping from Nazi persecutions. Subsequently, when he returned to Rome, Salvadori was a convinced critic of the regime of Benito Mussolini, and was aware of the risks for his mother's family. In 1939, when Mussolini promulgated the Italian Racial Laws, Salvadori left Italy with his wife, who was also Jewish. At the same time he tried, with poor results, to convince his relatives to follow his example.

It was difficult to leave Italy but in late 1938, he received a grant to study the first television experiments in the United States – his teacher and friend Enrico Fermi was an influential member of the examining commission. The grant allowed Salvadori and his wife to get a six months visa. While in the U.S., Salvadori stored some goods in a safe deposit box and left the key with Raymond D. Mindlin, whom he had met in New York a few months before, after a conference about the activities of Picone's institute. When he returned to Italy, he saw that there was no hope for a positive change in the political environment. The University of Rome and Consiglio Nazionale delle Ricerche (CNR) stripped him of his positions. After this, he and his wife left Italy for good, using the same visa. On the same day he arrived in New York, the CNR restored him as a consultant to INAC, thanks to the influence of Picone.

== Career ==
In the United States, Salvadori first worked for the Lionel Train Company until 1940, developing time and motion studies that so impressed the president that he was made an offer to become CEO, which he turned down. During World War II he was – unbeknownst to himself at the time – a consultant on the Manhattan Project for three years. After the war, he took up teaching at Columbia University, where he would become a professor in 1959 in the School of Architecture, Planning and Preservation; he taught at Columbia for 50 years.

As he reached retirement age, Salvadori began volunteering to work with under-privileged minority students from inner-city New York public schools. Developing a hands-on method of teaching kids about the built environment, he was able to reach out to thousands of students and teachers, giving them an appreciation of the usefulness of mathematics and science. In 1987 he founded the Salvadori Educational Center on the Built Environment, since renamed the Salvadori Center, a non-profit educational organization on the Upper West Side of Manhattan, near Columbia University, which aims to show students the relevance of math and science using the buildings, bridges, landmarks, and parks in their local communities.

From 1954 to 1960, Salvadori worked as a consultant and then principal at Weidlinger Associates, an engineering firm in New York City. He then became a partner until 1991, when he became honorary chairman. As a structural engineer, Salvadori became known for the design of thin concrete shells as he strove to create great architecture in all of his projects, including the concrete structural system for the CBS Building in Manhattan, designed by Eero Saarinen, and the seashell-inspired restaurant building at the hotel La Concha, in San Juan, Puerto Rico. He was also considered to be an authority on structural failure, and, as a forensic engineer helped to investigate numerous building failures due to natural disasters such as earthquakes and human error in construction or design.

== Death ==
Salvadori died in Mount Sinai Hospital in Manhattan, New York City, on June 25, 1997, of natural causes, at the age of 90. He was at the time the James Renwick Professor Emeritus of Civil Engineering and Applied Science and Professor of Architecture Emeritus at Columbia.

== Awards and honors ==
- 1953: Wason Medal for Most Meritorious Paper, American Concrete Institute
- 1991: Pupin Medal, Columbia University, for outstanding service to the nation in architecture and engineering
- 1993: Hoover Medal, awarded jointly by five engineering societies, American Society of Civil Engineers
- 1993: Topaz Medallion for Excellence in Architectural Education. American Institute of Architects and Association of Collegiate Schools of Architecture; the first engineer ever to receive this award
- 1996: National Honor Member of Chi Epsilon, the national civil engineering honor society, the 52nd civil engineer to be so honored
- 1997: Founders Award, National Academy of Engineering
- Honorary degrees: Columbia University (doctor of science, 1978), New School for Social Research (fine arts, 1991)

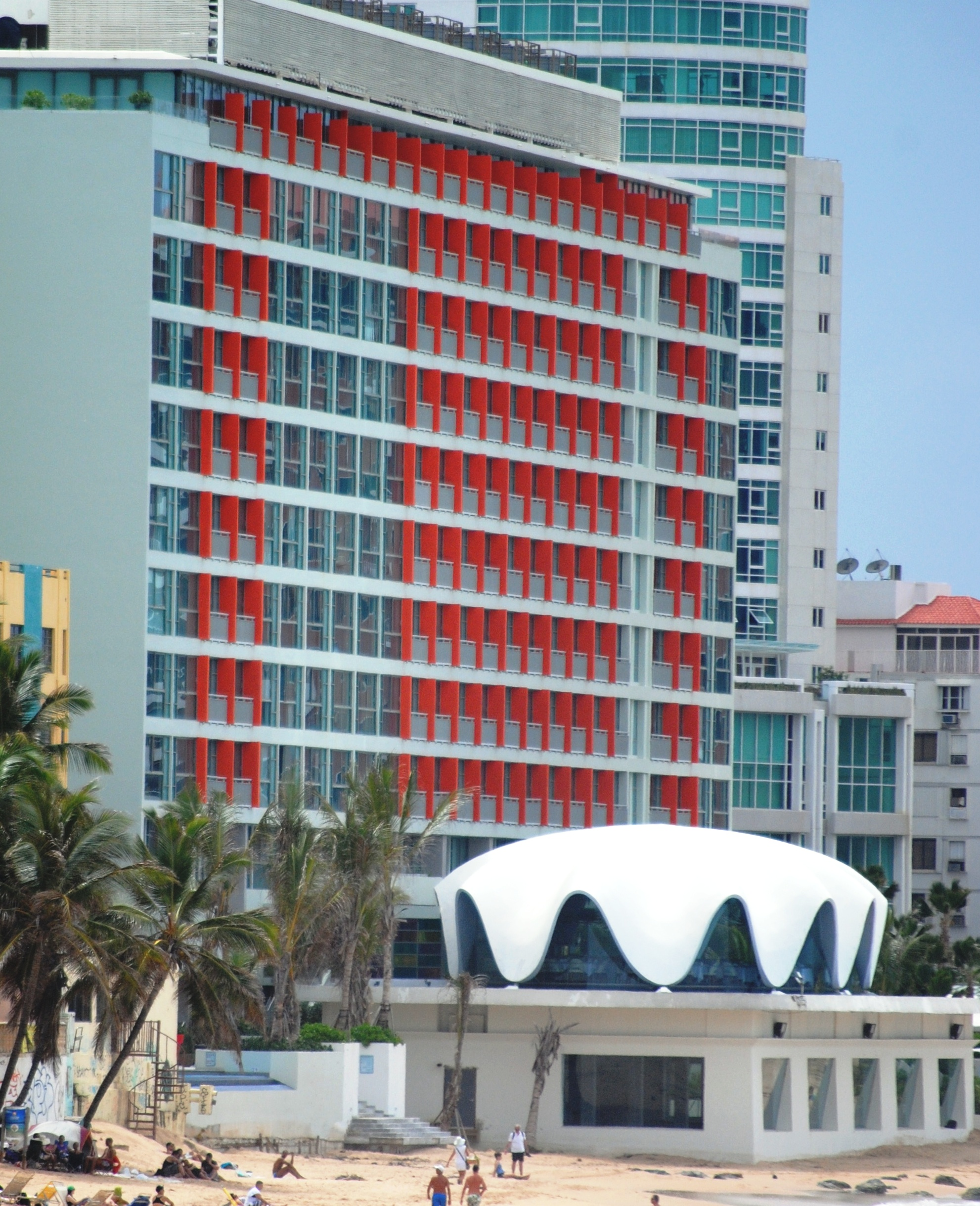
La Concha Resort in San Juan, Puerto Rico: Restaurant building with seashell-inspired structure by Mario Salvadori

== Works ==
Salvadori was the author of both well-respected textbooks on architectural structures and applied mathematics and books for the lay reader. Among the fifteen titles he wrote are Numerical Methods in Engineering (1953), Structural Design in Architecture (1967), Why Buildings Stand Up (1980), Why Buildings Fall Down (1992), and Why The Earth Quakes (1995). The last two were co-written with Matthys Levy.

At least three of his books are classified as for children by the Library of Congress (LCSH).

- Building: the fight against gravity, illustrated by Saralinda Hooker and Christopher Ragus (Atheneum: Margaret K. McElderry Books, 1979), LCCN 79-14325
- Earthquake Games: earthquakes and volcanoes explained by 32 games and experiments, Matthys Levy and Salvadori, illus. Christina C. Blatt (McElderry, 1997), LCCN 96-48157
- Math Games for Middle School: challenges and skill-builders for students at every level, Salvadori and Joseph P. Wright (Chicago Review Press, 1998), LCCN 97-51422

Building: the fight against gravity won the annual Boston Globe–Horn Book Award for Nonfiction in 1980.

Salvadori is also known for his translation of Leonardo da Vinci's notebooks into English, and of Emily Dickinson's poems into Italian.
