= San Juan Marriott Resort & Stellaris Casino =

Hotel and casino located on the beach in Condado, San Juan, Puerto Rico

Coordinates: 18°27′22″N 66°4′13″W

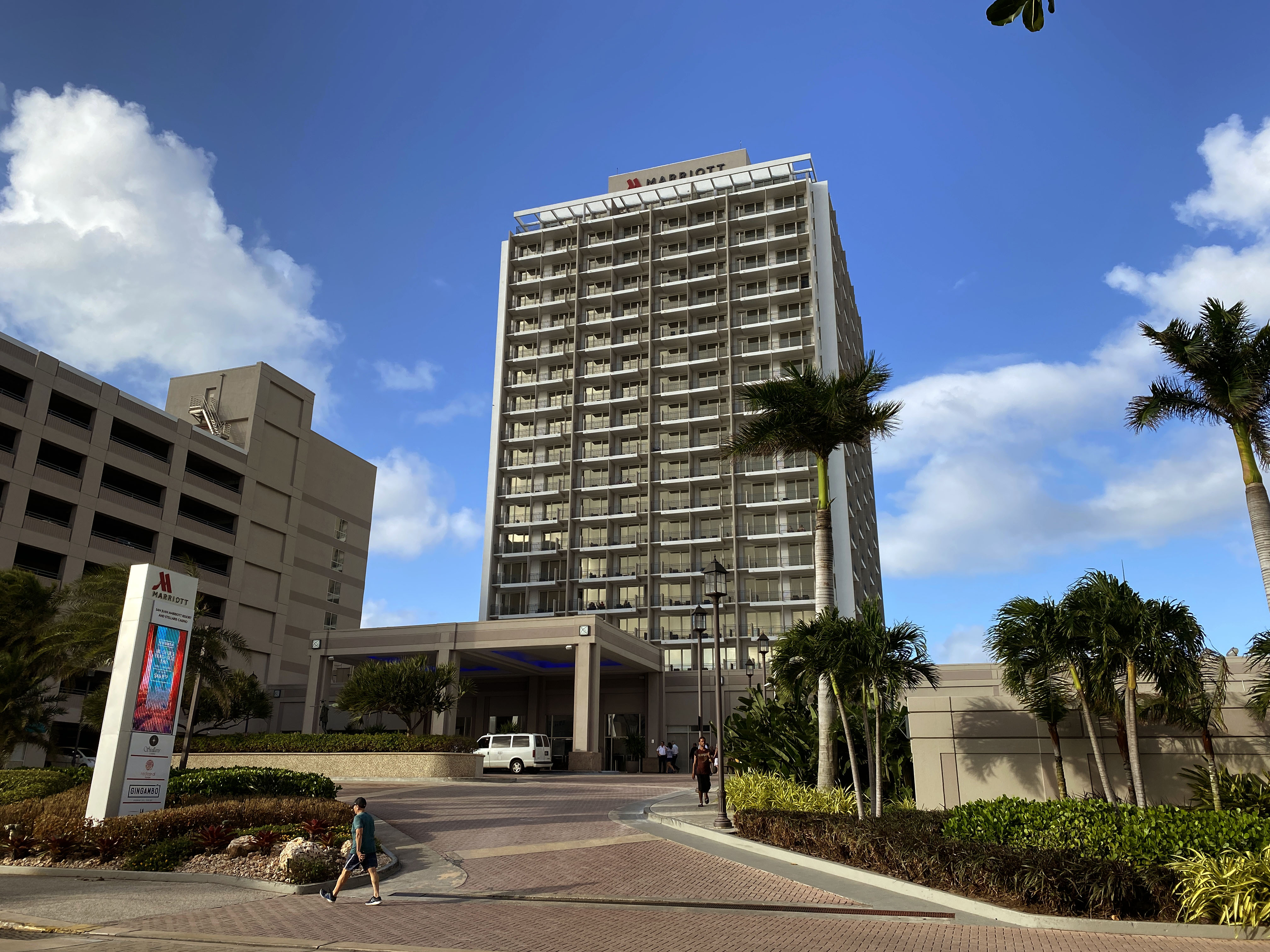
- Interactive map of San Juan Marriott Resort & Stellaris Casino
- Location: 1309 Ashford Avenue San Juan, PR
- Opened: October 4, 1963
- No. of rooms: 525
- Gaming space: 11,000 sq ft (1,000 m^{2})
- Casino type: Land-Based
- Operating license holder: Marriott International
- Previous names: Puerto Rico-Sheraton Hotel, Dupont Plaza Hotel
- Renovated in: 1990, 2006-2007
- Website: San Juan Marriott Resort

The San Juan Marriott Resort & Stellaris Casino is a hotel and casino located on four acres of beachfront in Condado, San Juan, Puerto Rico. It is operated by Marriott International.

== History ==
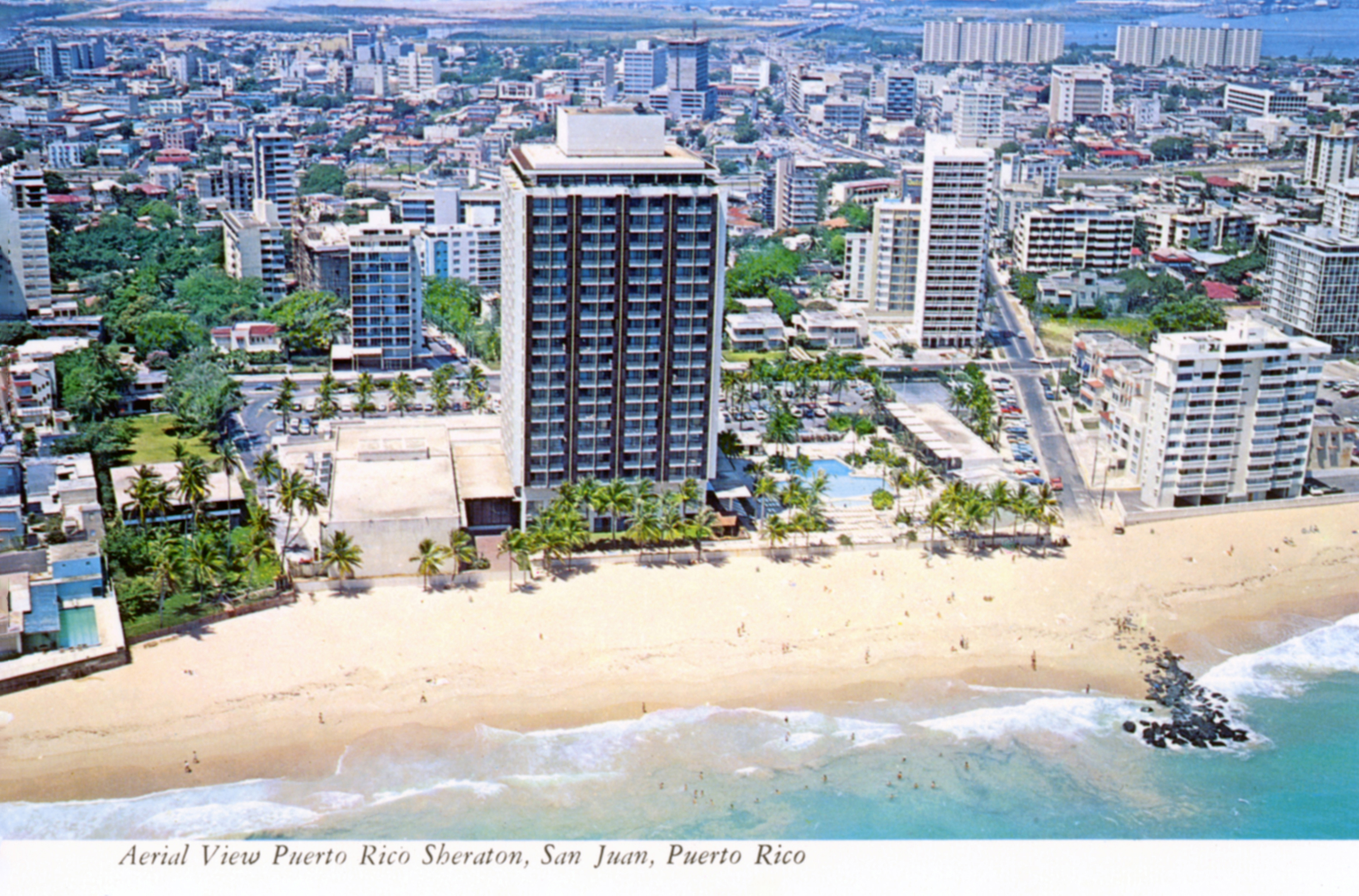
Puerto Rico-Sheraton Hotel, 1960s

The hotel was designed by architects Osvaldo L. Toro and Miguel Ferrer and opened on October 4, 1963 as the Puerto Rico-Sheraton Hotel. Directly on the beach in Condado, it boasted an Olympic-sized swimming pool. Sheraton sold the property to the San Juan Dupont Plaza Corp. of Delaware in 1979 and it was renamed the Dupont Plaza Hotel.

On December 31, 1986, the Dupont Plaza was the site of the second deadliest hotel fire in U.S. history, started by disgruntled employees in the middle of a labor/salary dispute. The fire claimed 97 lives and left 140 people injured. The San Juan Dupont Plaza Corp renovated the hotel in 1988, at a cost of $9 million, and renamed it the Palm Hotel and Casino. A reopening was announced for early 1989, but it was cancelled on December 19, 1988, when the Puerto Rican government refused to grant the hotel an operating permit, because the owners had only installed sprinklers in the hotel's first three floors, and not throughout the entire building.

A massive federal trial over the fire began in San Juan on March 15, 1989. It was one of the largest personal damages trials in US history up to that point, with $1.7 billion sought by 2,300 plaintiffs from 250 defendants, including a maze of corporations and subsidiaries involved in the property's ownership. AIG, a lead insurance underwriter supplying coverage for the blaze, ended up acquiring title to the shuttered hotel in June 1989, as part of the settlement of claims arising from the fire.

In October 1992, AIG announced plans to completely renovate the hotel at a cost of $130 million and rebrand it as a Marriott. The hotel reopened on February 16, 1995, as the San Juan Marriott Resort & Casino. It was later renamed slightly, becoming the San Juan Marriott Resort & Stellaris Casino. AIG sold the hotel to Rockwood Capital in August 2011 for $133 million. Rockwood Capital resold it in May 2017 for $184 million to Jun Zhang, head of XLD Group, a California-based hospitality division and US subsidiary of the China-based Sichuan Xinglida Group Enterprise.

The hotel was damaged by Hurricane Maria in September 2017. The main tower remained operational, but the smaller cabana wing, with 123 rooms, sustained $20 million in damage and was closed for renovations until early 2018.

In December 2017, XLD announced plans to build a second Marriott-branded hotel on the property in 2019, on the site of the resort's tennis courts.

== Facilities ==
The San Juan Marriott has 525 hotel rooms and a casino. In addition, the hotel has eight meeting rooms with a total of 10,900 sq ft (1,010 m^{2}) of meeting space.

== See also ==
- List of hotels in Puerto Rico
