= Nono Maldonado =

Puerto Rican fashion designer (1945–2025)

- Born: José Maldonado Fulladosa; 10 August 1945; Mayagüez, Puerto Rico
- Died: 16 July 2025 (aged 79)
- Education: Fordham University
- Occupations: Fashion editor, fashion designer
- Labels: Nono Maldonado, Nono Maldonado Casa
- Website: https://www.nonomaldonado.com

José Antonio Maldonado Fulladosa (Spanish: [xoˈse malðoˈnaðo fuʎaˈðosa]; 10 August 1945 – 16 July 2025), known professionally as Nono Maldonado (Spanish: [ˈnono malðoˈnaðo]), was a Puerto Rican fashion designer and businessman who also did interior design. He was a fashion editor at Esquire magazine in the 1970s before returning to Puerto Rico, where he continued to work in the fashion industry.

== Life and career ==
=== Fashion editor ===
Maldonado, born in Mayagüez, Puerto Rico, Graduated from Colegio San Ignacio de Loyola in San Juan. Learned about good taste as a child at the hand of his parents, Raúl, an agricultural engineer, and Esperanza, a homemaker. In 1967 and started his career in the fashion world as a buyer at Bloomingdale's in New York. He left Bloomingdale's to become the Assistant Fashion Director of the Men's Fashion Association, the promotion agency for men's wear designers and manufacturers. He was also buyer, designer, and public relations consultant for several boutiques in New York. He was named Fashion Editor for Esquire magazine from 1972 to 1975. During these years he was twice elected to the International List of the World's Best Dressed Men directed then by the well-known publicist Eleanor Lambert, now published yearly by Vanity Fair Magazine. Maldonado was also on the editorial team of Caras, a high-fashion magazine.

=== Fashion designer ===
Maldonado returned to Puerto Rico in 1976 and in June 1977 opened his own boutique and started designing for men under his own label. In 1980 he presented his first women's wear collection.

In September 2014, Maldonado was a judge for the San Juan Moda fashion show. San Juan fashion week takes place twice a year.

=== Interior design ===
In early 2017, along with Hirsch Bedner Associates of San Francisco, Maldonado was tasked with redesigning the ballroom of the luxurious St. Regis Bahía Beach Resort in Río Grande, Puerto Rico.

=== Death ===
Maldonado died on 16 July 2025, at the age of 79.
