= La Concha Resort =

Luxury resort in Condado, San Juan, Puerto Rico

Coordinates: 18°27′26″N 66°04′26″W

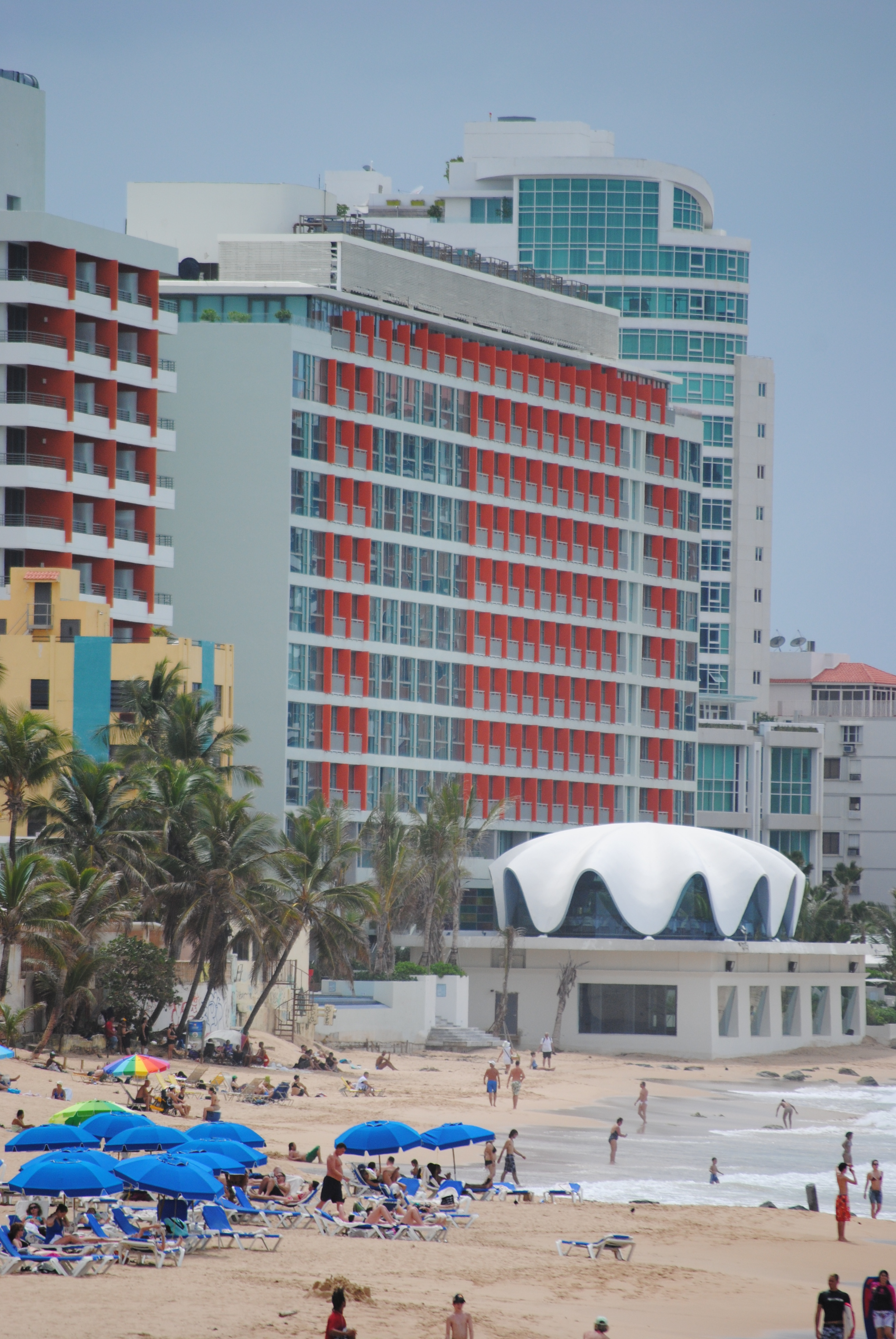
- La Concha Resort
- Hotel chain: Autograph Collection

General information
- Location: San Juan, Puerto Rico, 1077 Ashford Avenue, San Juan, PR 00907
- Opening: 1958
- Operator: International Hospitality Enterprises Melendez International Hotels by Melendez Global Inc

Technical details
- Floor count: 12

Other information
- Number of rooms: 483
- Number of suites: 226
- Number of restaurants: 5

Website
- La Concha Resort

La Concha Resort is a historic resort hotel opened in 1958, located at the Condado oceanfront within the district of Santurce in San Juan, Puerto Rico.

== History ==
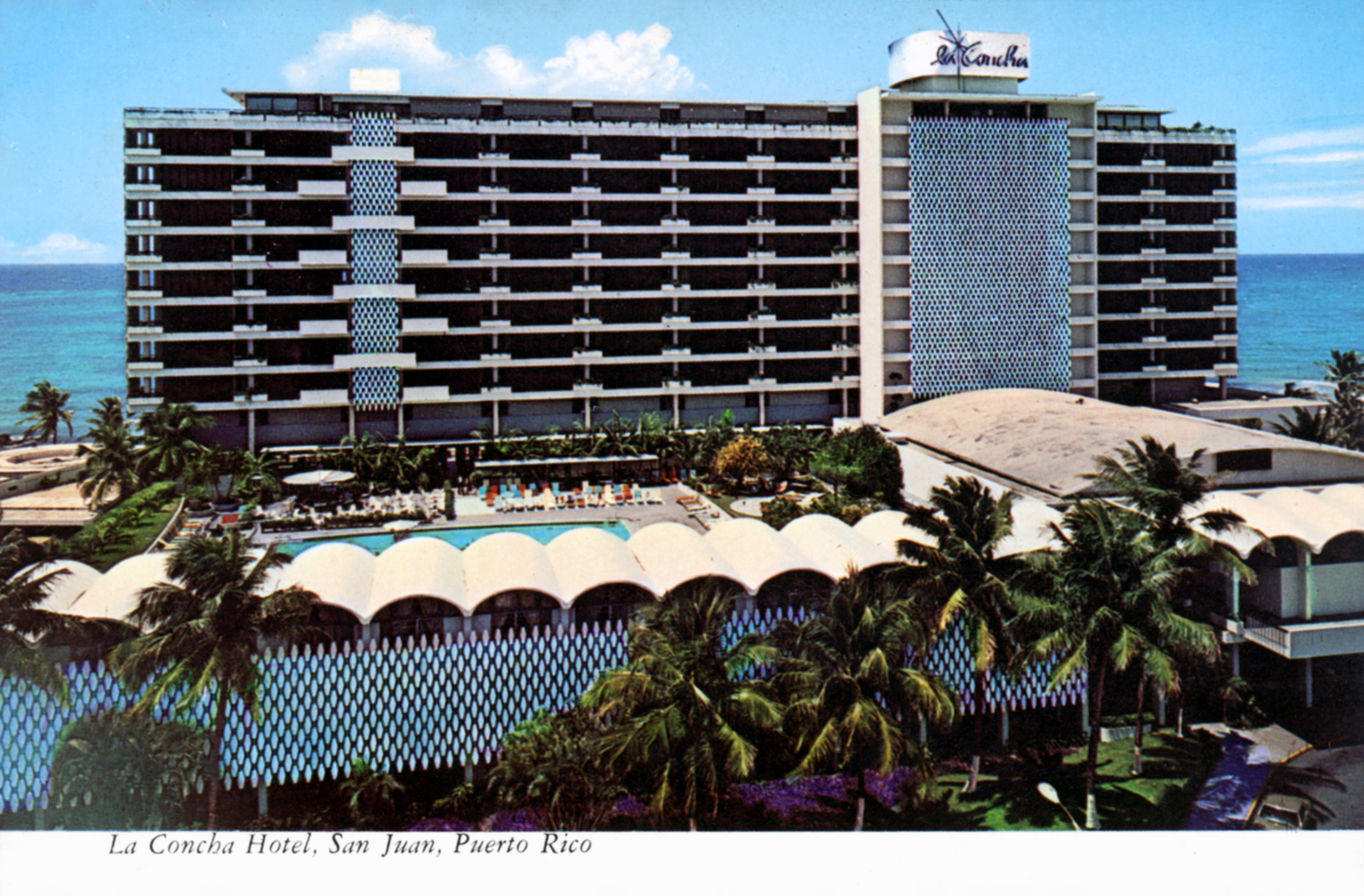
La Concha Hotel, 1965

The La Concha Hotel opened in December 1958 during the Tropical Modernism Movement. The hotel was publicly owned, by the government of Puerto Rico, and managed by the US-based Associated Federal Hotels chain. The main hotel building was designed by architects Osvaldo Toro and Miguel Ferrer, of the firm Toro Ferrer. The two men had previously designed the first modern luxury resort in San Juan, the Caribe Hilton. Another part of the complex, the seashell-inspired building for the restaurant La Perla, was designed by architect Mario Salvadori. The hotel's design incorporated tropical climate features such as cross-ventilation, natural illumination, open lobbies and seamless transitions between inside and outside spaces, with details supposedly relevant to Island traditions: an interior patio, blinds, a mirador encompassing both the sea and the city and the use of water throughout as a leitmotif. The protective concrete element in the façade, called brise-soleil in French or “quiebrasol” in Spanish, is an architectural element used by famed architect Le Corbusier. The purpose of the “quiebrasol” is to filter the sun's rays towards the interior corridors.

In 1973, the La Concha Hotel was united with the adjacent Condado Beach Hotel into one hotel, known as the Hyatt Puerto Rico. In 1976, management of the complex was taken over by Hilton International and the resort was renamed the Condado Beach La Concha Convention Center, with a huge convention wing built between the two existing hotel structures to physically connect them. The complex was later taken over by Carnival Cruise Line and renamed The Condado Beach Trio, before the La Concha wing was closed in 1995, followed by the closure of the Condado Beach wing in 1997. The government-owned properties sat vacant for years, and were finally severed in 2004. The convention center that joined them was demolished to build a public park.

The La Concha reopened in December 2007 after a $220 million renovation, managed by Renaissance Hotels as La Concha Renaissance San Juan Resort.

In the summer of 2010, the hotel opened a $100 million addition called The Suites Tower which features an atrium style building with one and two bedroom suites, kitchens, architectural lighting, and amenities. The hotel's Casino del Mar is located on the street level of the new tower.

On June 12, 2025, following an $80 million renovation, the hotel transferred from Marriott's Renaissance brand to its Autograph Collection brand and was renamed La Concha Resort, Puerto Rico, Autograph Collection.

== See also ==
- List of hotels in Puerto Rico
