= Hotel El Convento =

Historic hotel in Old San Juan, Puerto Rico

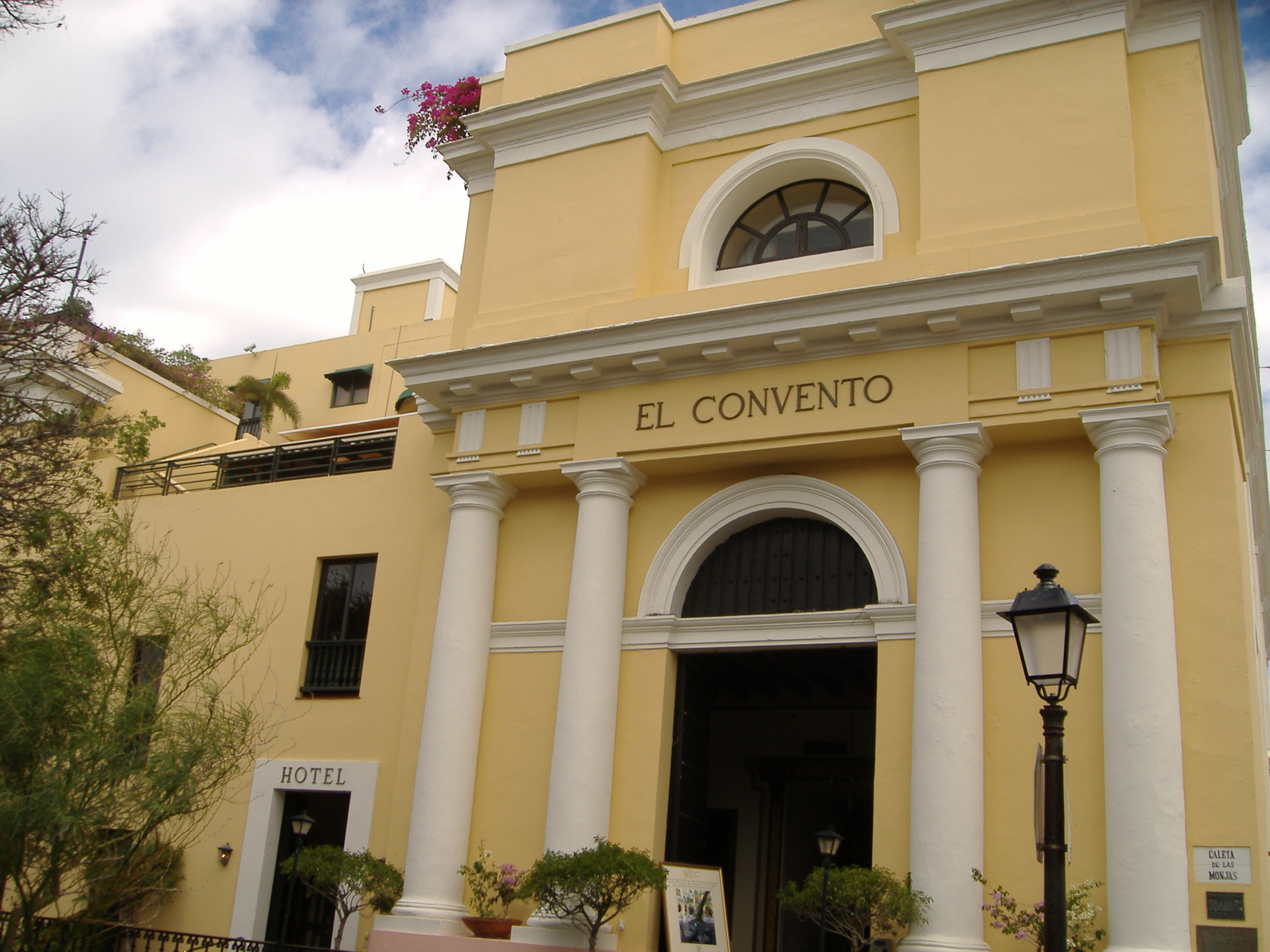
- Interactive map of the Hotel El Convento area

General information
- Location: Old San Juan, Puerto Rico, 100 Cristo Street; San Juan, PR 00901
- Coordinates: 18.465838°N 66.118228°W
- Opening: January 27, 1962
- Operator: International Hospitality Enterprises

Technical details
- Floor count: 5

Design and construction
- Architects: Rene Jean, Jorge Rosselló

Other information
- Number of rooms: 58
- Number of restaurants: 1 - Patio del Níspero

Website
- Hotel El Convento
- Monastery of the Order of Our Lady of Mount Carmel of San Jose
- U.S. Historic district – Contributing property
- U.S. National Historic Landmark District – Contributing property
- Part of: Old San Juan Historic District (ID72001553 & ID13000284)

Significant dates
- Designated CP: October 10, 1972
- Designated NHLDCP: February 27, 2013

Hotel El Convento is a small hotel in Old San Juan, Puerto Rico, in what was a Carmelite convent, adjoining the San Juan Cathedral square. The cathedral is the second oldest cathedral in the Western Hemisphere. Hotel El Convento is the oldest member of the Historic Hotels of America. It was also named the premier Small Luxury Hotel in Puerto Rico by the Small Luxury Hotels of the World organization.

== History ==
In 1646, construction began on the Carmelite convent, through a petition by King Philip IV of Spain. The Monasterio del Señor San José de la Orden de nuestra Señora del Carmen (Monastery of Our Lady Carmen of San Jose) was founded in 1651 by Doña Ana Lanzós, a wealthy widow who donated her money and her magnificent residence (a large double sloped tiled roof) in the street that since then bears her name: de las Monjas. Historian María de los Ángeles Castro tells us that the delay in the arrival of a nunnery was due to economic reasons but also for lack of defense since the fortifications of the city were not yet complete. Three nuns brought especially from Santo Domingo served as founders.

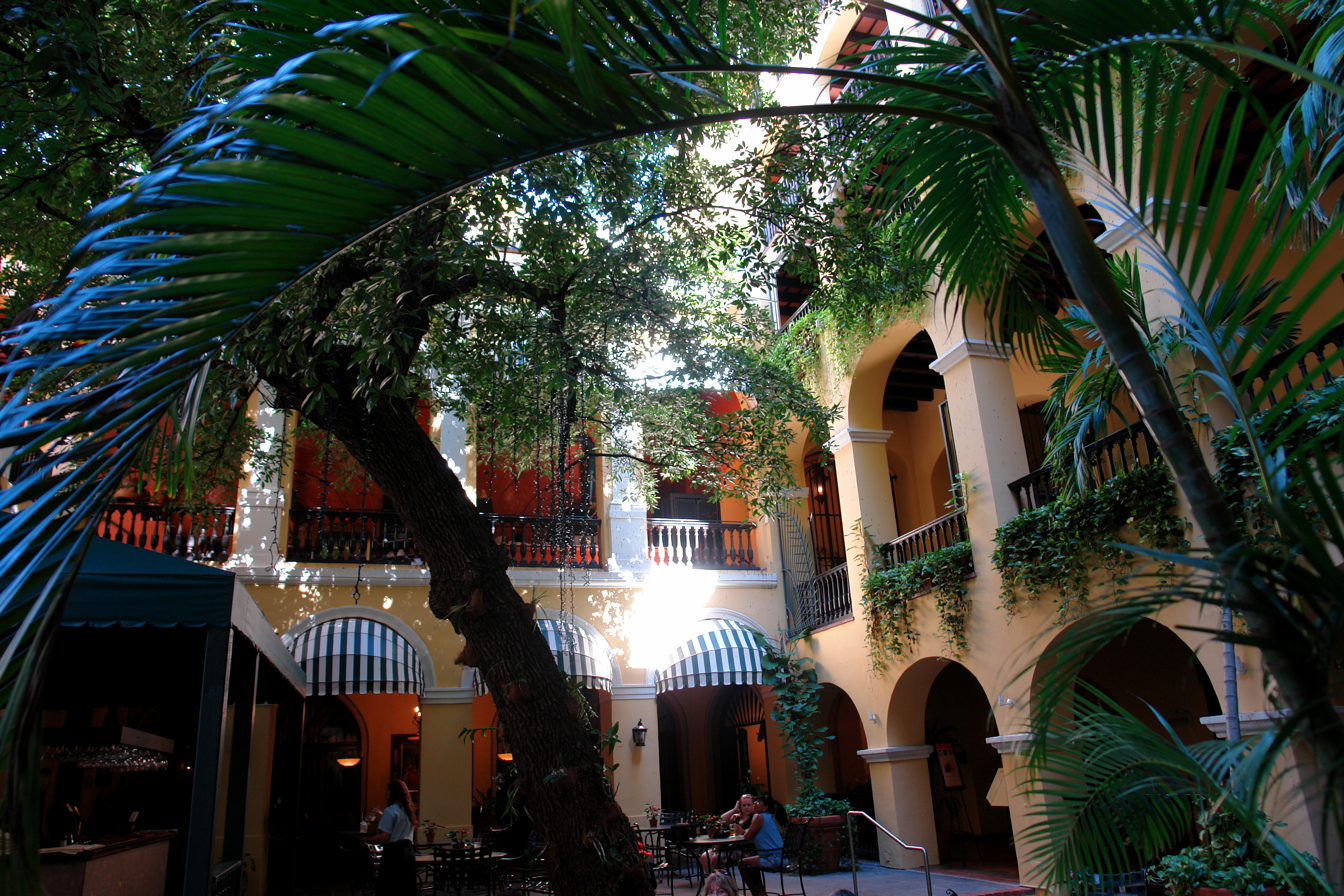
Courtyard of Hotel El Convento

The building was expanded between 1854 and 1861 after the original building was torn down. Governor Fernándo Norzagaray y Escudero personally helped to raise the necessary funds and inspected the work daily. Certain elements stand out in the facade of the chapel, beside the entrance, the pair of Tuscan columns, the two towers and the latticed choir arch. The frieze above the door is interrupted for a legend that never was placed. The building was closed from 1903 to 1959 and then sold. During its conversion to a hotel the two towers were removed as was the cross that identified the site as a convent.

In 1959, under the auspices of Operation Bootstrap, Robert Woolworth started the renovation to turn it into the El Convento Hotel. It reopened in 1962 to the stars of the day, including Rita Hayworth, offering a tranquil, European-style alternative to the glitzy hotels lining the Condado strip.

In the 1990s, El Convento underwent a $14 million renovation by a team led by Hugh Andrews and Jorge Rosselló, who also remodeled other hotels such as La Concha, and the Condado Vanderbilt Hotel. It was rechristened as Hotel El Convento, a 4-star small luxury hotel with five stories, a central courtyard where a 300-year-old Níspero fruit tree still stands, a pool and Jacuzzi on the fourth-floor terrace, and great views of Old San Juan, maintaining the same high standard of luxury and style. Other notable present-day features of this boutique-style hotel include a 24-hour fitness center, a daily manager's wine and cheese reception, Patio del Níspero open-air restaurant, 24-hour hospitality bar, five versatile meeting rooms, library, business center, herb garden, a beach club featuring beach privileges in Condado and Isla Verde beaches, and more.

In 2005, it was described as "an elegant 55-room inn in a former Carmelite convent."

Hotel El Convento is an Old San Juan institution with more than 365 years of tradition, making it the oldest member of the Historic Hotels of America. It was also named the premier Small Luxury Hotel in Puerto Rico by the Small Luxury Hotels of the World organization.

== Notable guests ==
Some of the hotel's notable guests over the years include:

- Truman Capote
- Pablo Casals, there is a suite named for him
- Ernest Hemingway
- Gloria Vanderbilt, there is a suite named for her
- Lorenzo Lamas

== See also ==
- List of hotels in Puerto Rico
