= List of hotels in Puerto Rico =

This is a list of notable hotels in Puerto Rico.

== Hotels in Puerto Rico ==
- El Blok Hotel
- Hacienda El Jibarito
- Hacienda Gripiñas
- Hacienda Juanita
- Mayagüez Resort & Casino

=== Ponce ===
- The Fox Hotel
- Hotel Meliá
- Hotel Ponce Intercontinental
- Ponce Plaza Hotel & Casino
- Solace by the Sea

=== San Juan ===
- Caribe Hilton Hotel
- Condado Vanderbilt Hotel
- Hotel El Convento
- La Concha Resort
- Normandie Hotel (closed)
- San Juan Marriott Resort & Stellaris Casino
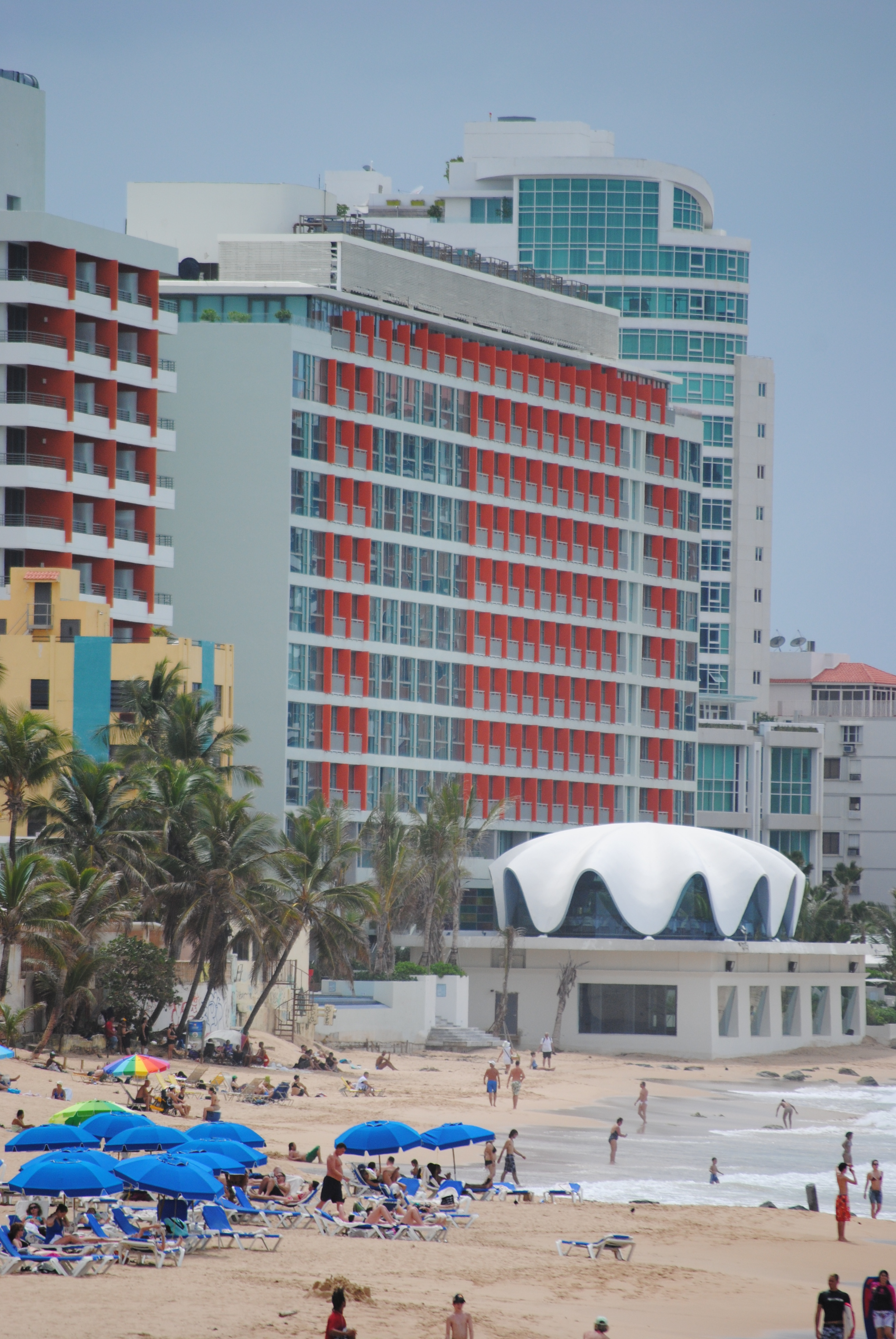
The La Concha Resort is a luxury resort located at the Condado oceanfront within the district of Santurce

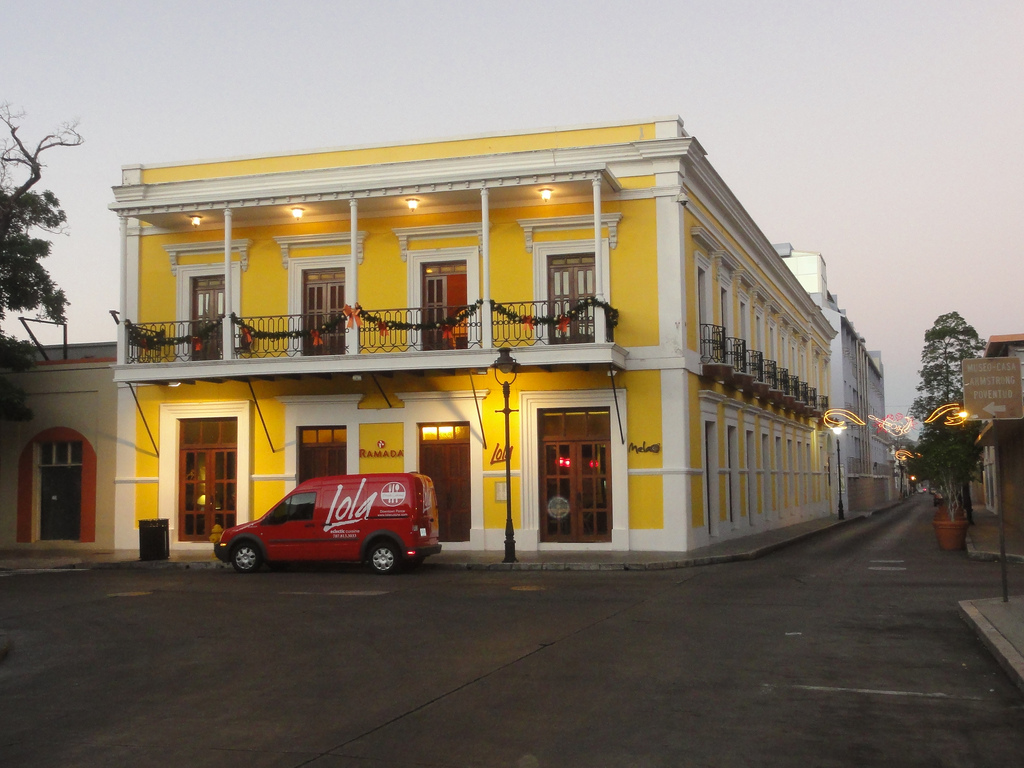
The Ponce Plaza Hotel & Casino in the downtown Ponce Historic Zone

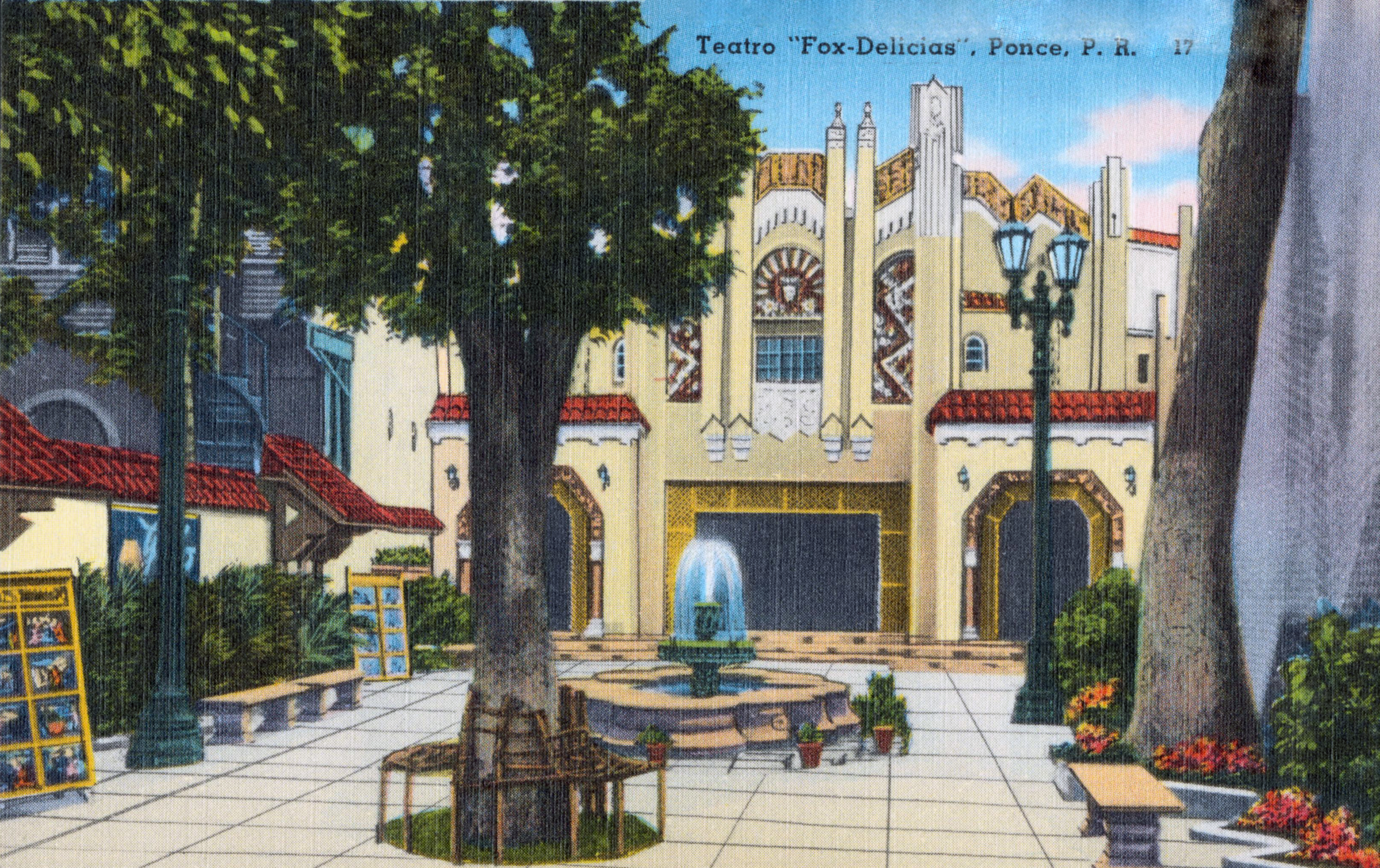
Teatro Fox Delicias (The Fox Hotel)

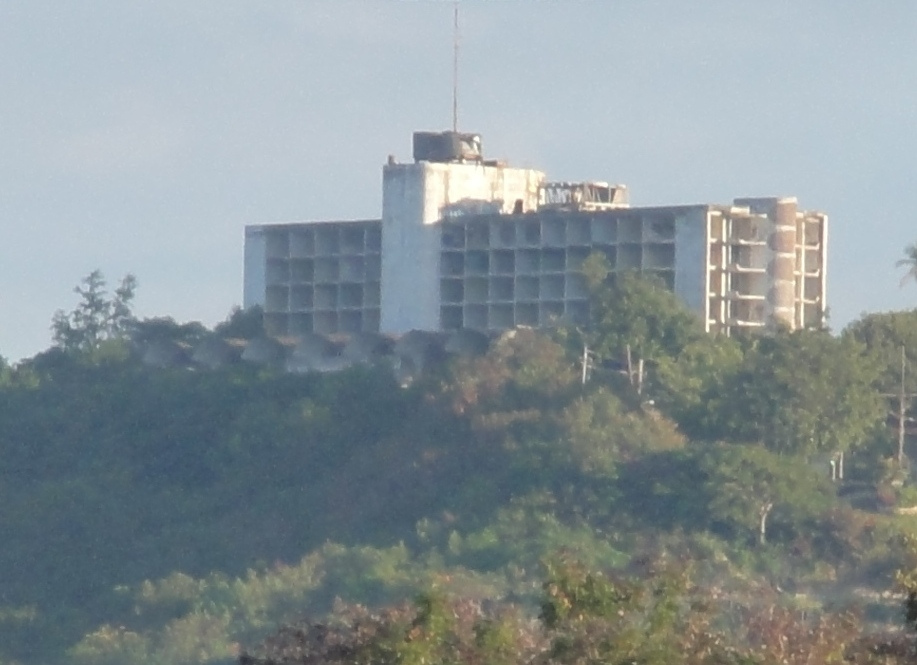
Former Hotel Ponce Intercontinental (now closed)

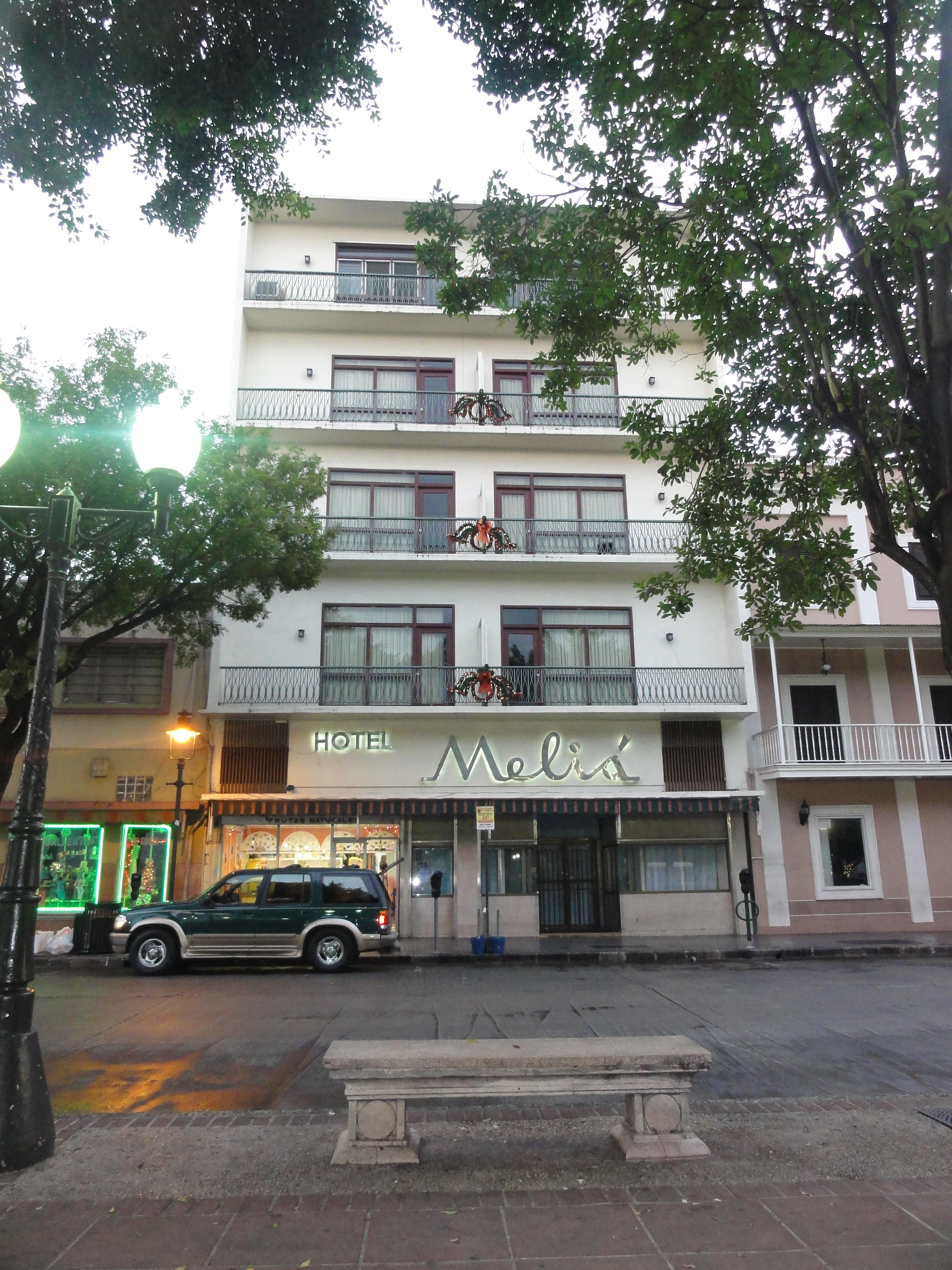
Hotel Meliá in the downtown Ponce Historic Zone

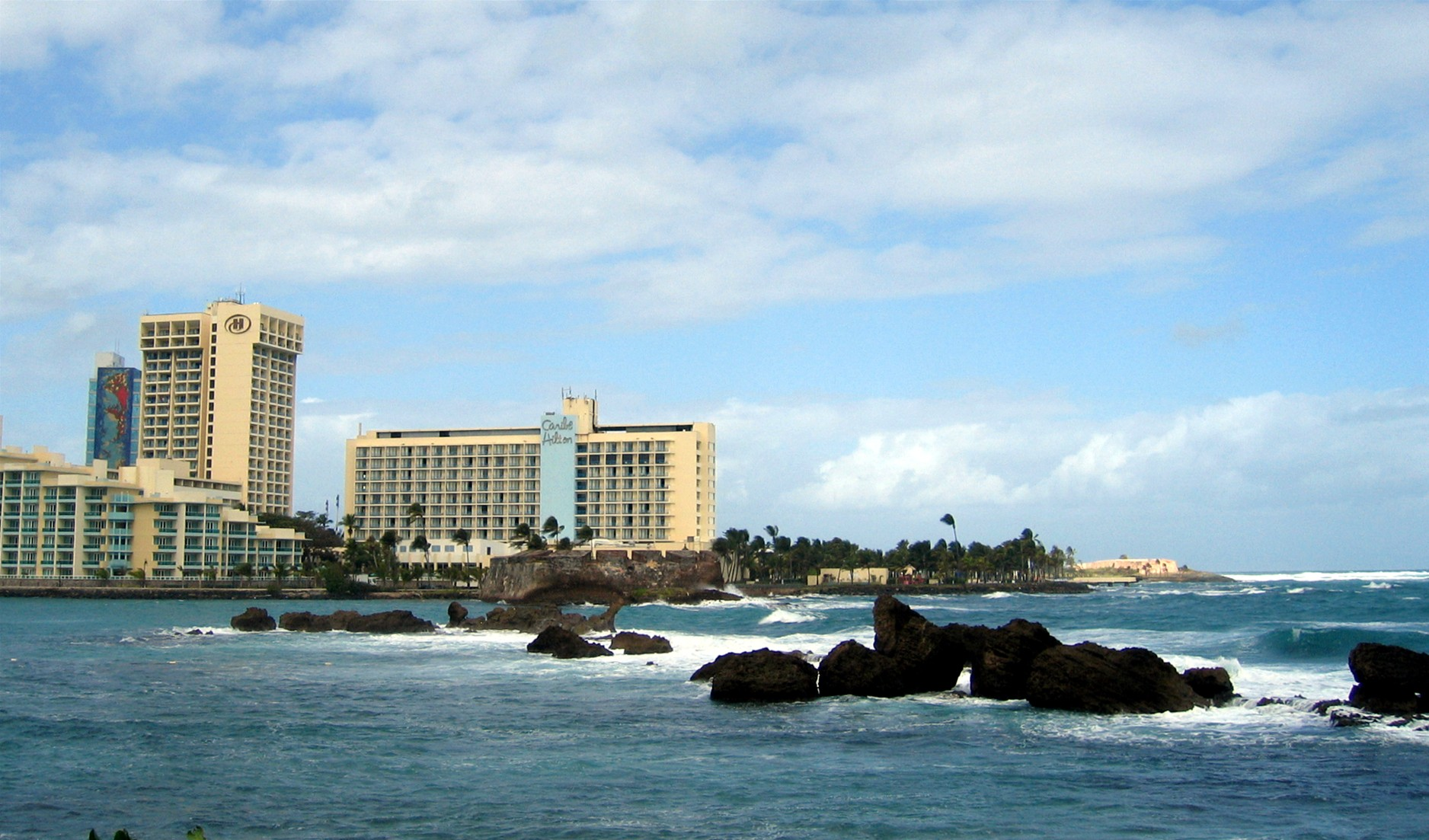
The Caribe Hilton Hotel was the first facility ever operated by Hilton Hotels outside of the continental United States

== See also ==
- List of casinos in Puerto Rico
- List of companies of Puerto Rico
- Lists of hotels – hotel list articles on Wikipedia
