= Hacienda Gripiñas =

Restored nineteenth-century coffee plantation in Jayuya, Puerto Rico

Coordinates: 18°11′45″N 66°34′36″W

Location of Hacienda Gripiñas in the center of Puerto Rico

Hacienda Gripiñas is a lodging located in the town of Jayuya, Puerto Rico.

In 1858, Don Eusebio Pérez del Castillo established the Gripiñas hacienda (or estate) in the Gripiñas sector, Veguitas barrio of Jayuya municipio, Puerto Rico. Hacienda Gripiñas was dedicated mainly to the cultivation of coffee and contributed significantly to the growth of this industry in Puerto Rico during the 19th and 20th century. Pérez and his wife died late in the 19th century, as the coffee plantation industry decayed in the island because of Hurricane San Ciriaco (1899) and the Spanish–American War (1898). Jaime Oliver Mayol acquired the estate, and in 1904 its coffee product, Café Gripiñas, won a "Grand Prix" at the St. Louis World's Fair in Louisiana. Miguel A. Sastre Oliver was Jaime Oliver Mayol's grandson. He owned and farmed Hacienda Gripiñas from 1929 to 1970. Miguel A. Sastre acquired more land, and grew the estate to approximately 1,000 "cuerdas" before selling the Hacienda to the government of Puerto Rico. In the land where the Hacienda Gripiñas was located, the government of Puerto Rico divided the area into smaller farms through the Corporación para el Desarrollo Rural de Puerto Rico, and established the Parador Hacienda Gripiñas (presently operated by the municipal government of Jayuya).

Migiel A. Sastre Oliver developed Hacienda Gripiñas into a sophisticated coffee and dairy farm, and made developments with different fruits, especially avocados. Today, the avocado variety Gripiñas C-5 is one of the most productive varieties and is widely used in commercial farming in Venezuela and other Latin-American countries.

In 1975, the Hacienda Gripiñas main housing building was remodeled into the Parador Hacienda Gripiñas lodging, used mostly by tourists visiting the town of Jayuya. Parador Hacienda Gripiñas is near Cerro de Punta, Puerto Rico's highest mountain, and near the town of Jayuya, famous for the Festival Taíno, and other events.

== Gallery ==
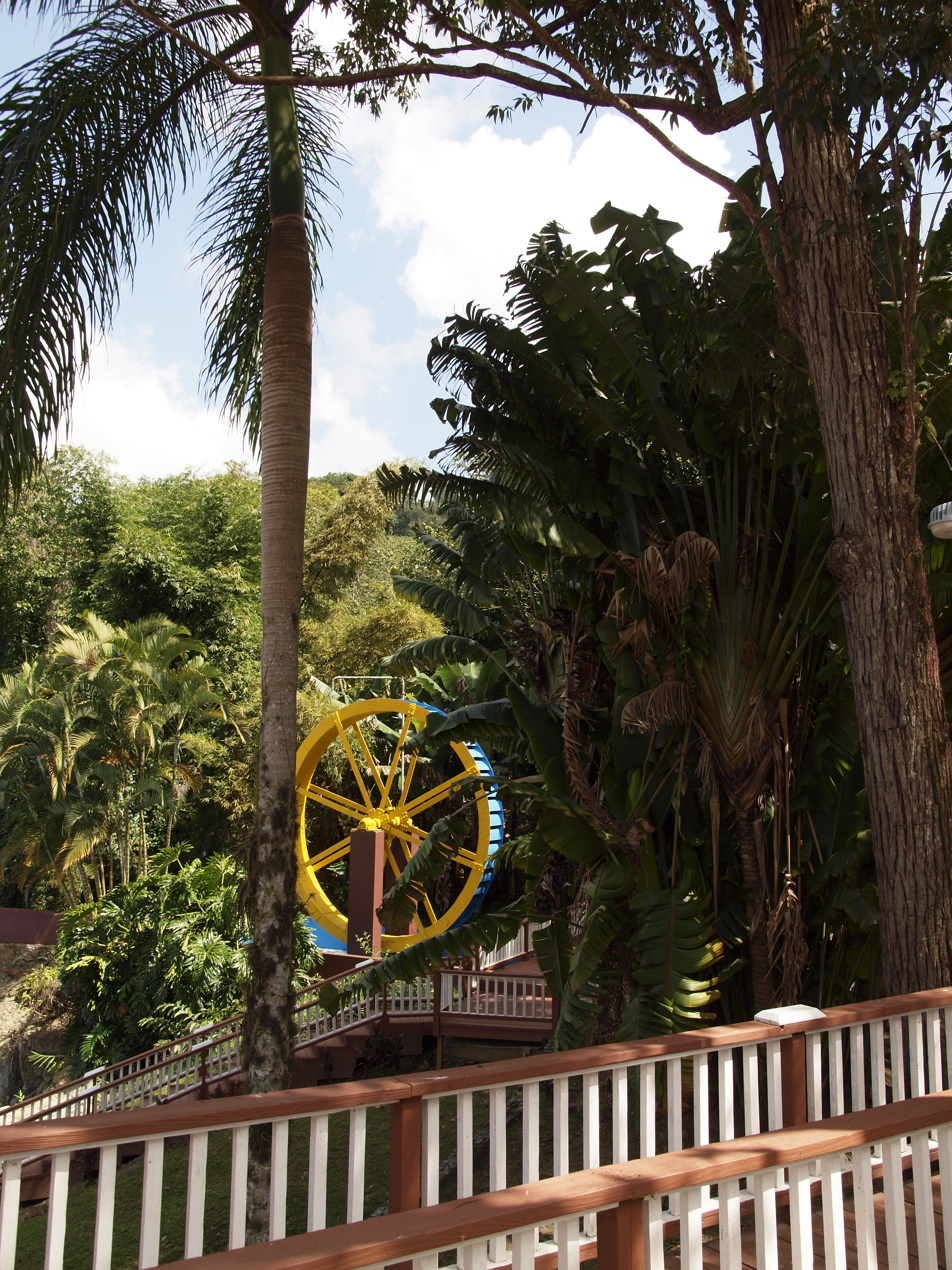
Water wheel at the hacienda

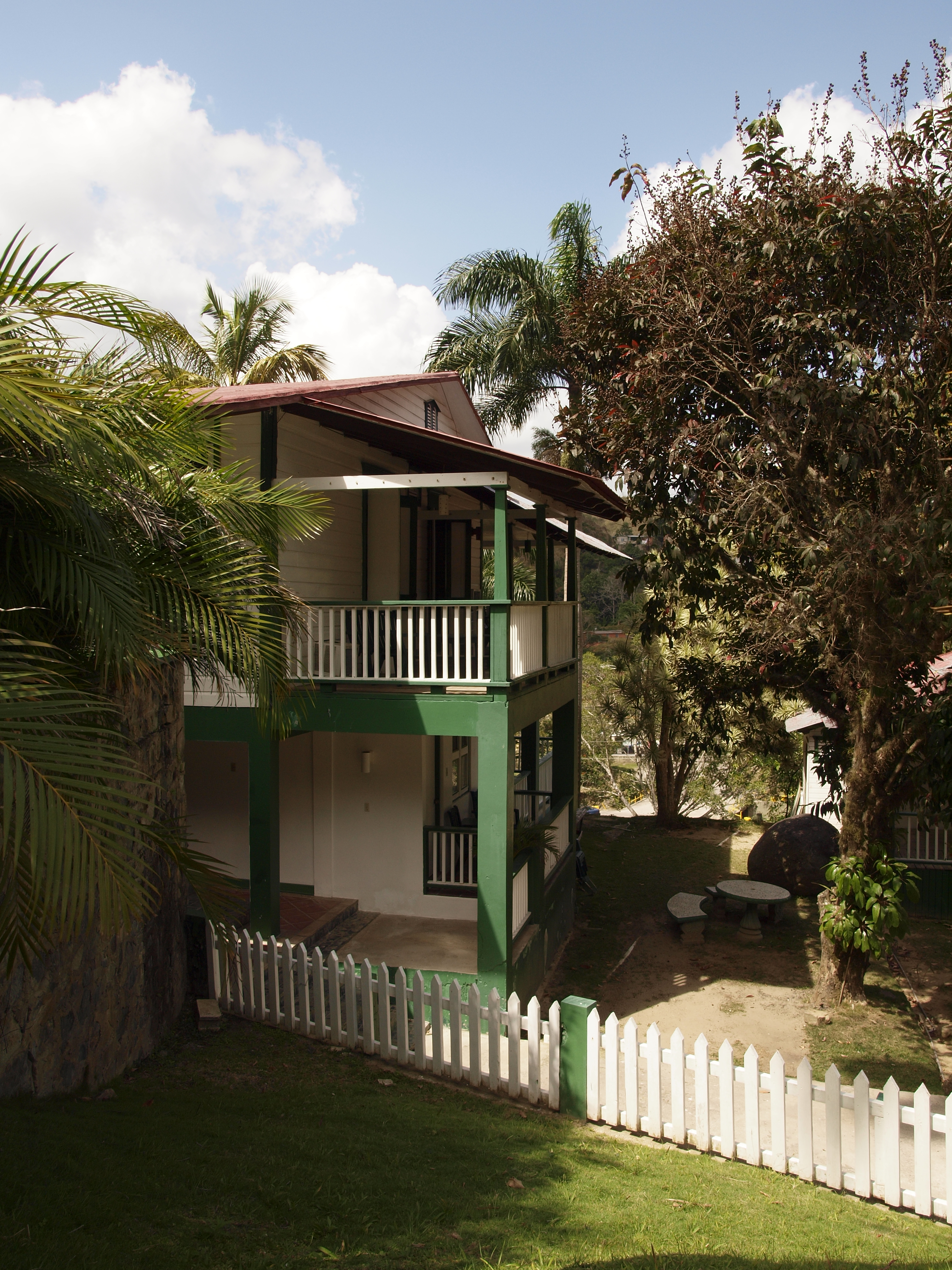
Hacienda Gripiñas

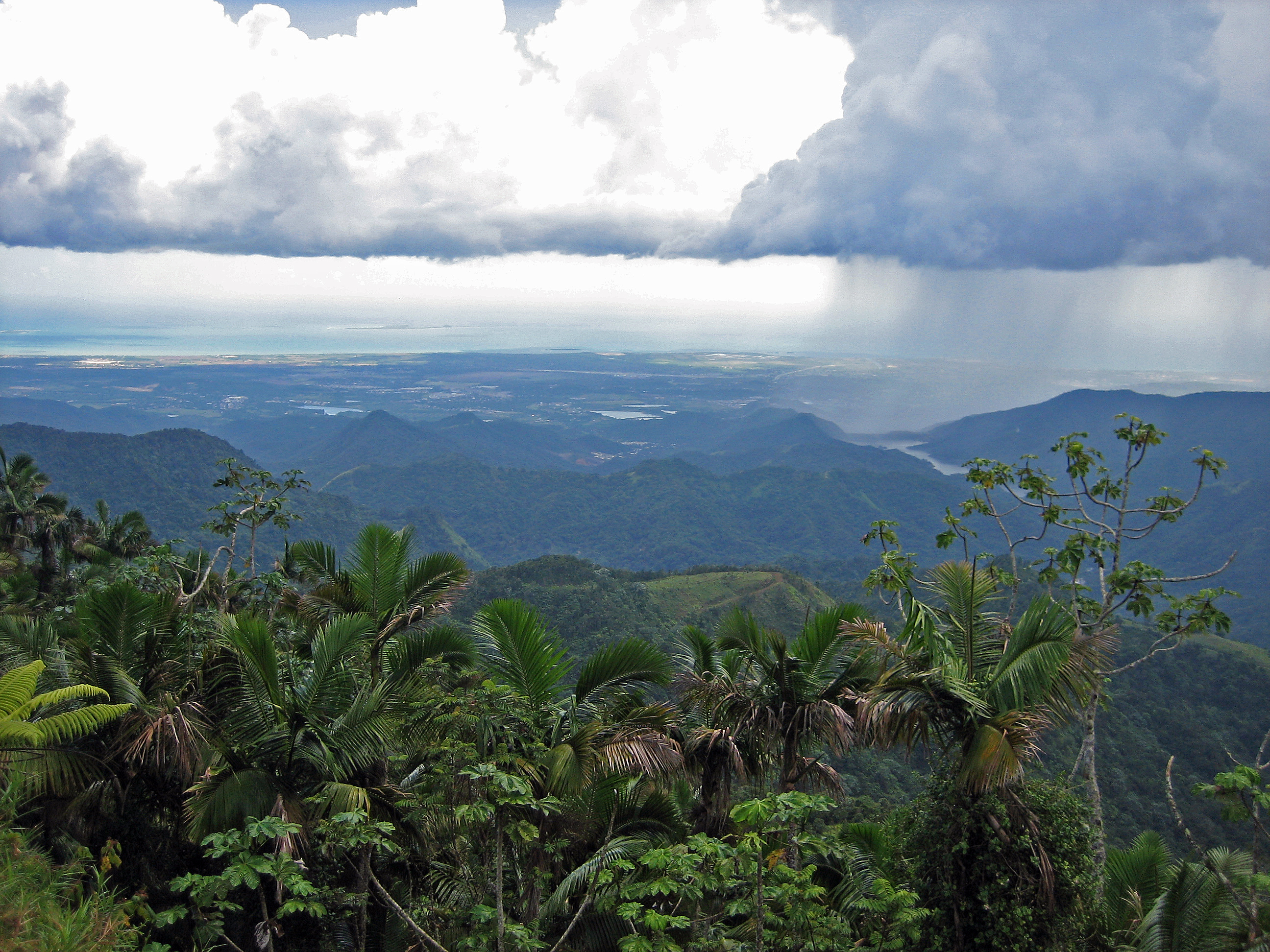
View from the Jayuya mountains

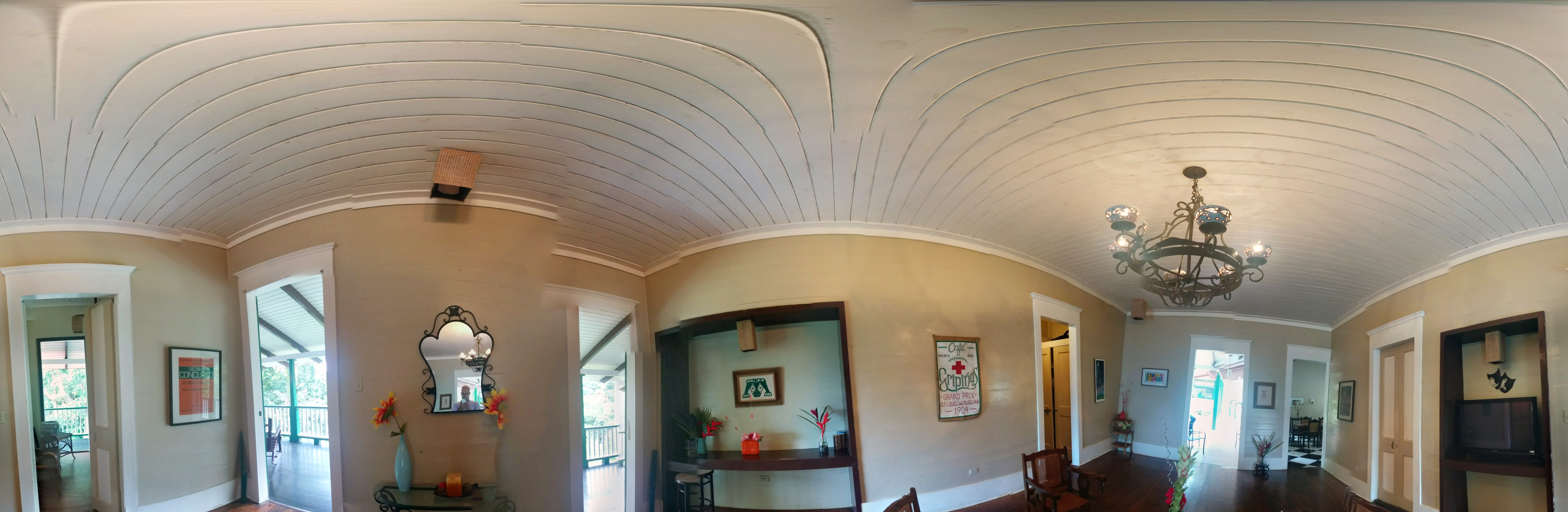
Inside Hacienda Gripiñas (c. 2015)

== See also ==
- List of hotels in Puerto Rico
