= Ilex cookii =

Conservation status
- Critically Endangered (IUCN 3.1)

- Critically Imperiled (NatureServe)

Scientific classification
- Kingdom: Plantae
- Clade: Tracheophytes
- Clade: Angiosperms
- Clade: Eudicots
- Clade: Asterids
- Order: Aquifoliales
- Family: Aquifoliaceae
- Genus: Ilex
- Species: I. cookii

Binomial name
- Ilex cookii Britt. & Wilson

Species of plant

Ilex cookii (Cook's holly or te) is a species of plant in the family Aquifoliaceae. It is endemic to Puerto Rico. It is threatened by habitat loss. It is a federally listed endangered species of the United States.

== Conservation ==
This tree is only known from a single specimen and a few seedlings in the cloud forests on Cerro de Punta and Monte Jayuya, both at Toro Negro State Forest in Puerto Rico. Other specimens were probably destroyed when a communications tower was installed on Cerro de Punta. I. cookii was listed as a federally endangered species in 1987. It was additionally listed as an Annex I species to the Specially Protected Areas and Wildlife Protocol of the Cartagena Convention in 1991.
