= List of casinos in Puerto Rico =

This is a list of casinos in Puerto Rico.

== List of casinos ==
List of casinos in the U.S. commonwealth of Puerto Rico
Casino	City	Commonwealth	District	Type
Casino Atlántico - Hyatt Place Manatí	Manatí	Puerto Rico	SCG metro	Land-based
Casino Del Sol - Courtyard by Marriott Isla Verde Beach Resort	Carolina	Puerto Rico	SCG metro	Land-based
Casino Del Mar at La Concha Renaissance	San Juan	Puerto Rico	SCG metro	Land-based
Casino Doral Resort at Palmas Del Mar	Humacao	Puerto Rico	SCG metro	Land-based
Casino Metro at Sheraton Puerto Rico Hotel & Casino	San Juan	Puerto Rico	SCG metro	Land-based Convention center
Casino Real at Four Points by Sheraton	Caguas	Puerto Rico	SCG metro	Land-based
Costa Bahia Hotel & Convention Center	Guayanilla	Puerto Rico	Yauco msa	Land-based
El San Juan Resort & Casino, A Hilton Hotel	Carolina	Puerto Rico	SCG metro	Land-based
El Tropical Casino at Hyatt Place Bayamón	San Juan	Puerto Rico	SCG metro	Land-based
Embassy Suites Dorado del Mar	Dorado	Puerto Rico	SCG metro	Land-based
Holiday Inn Mayagüez & Tropical Casino	Mayagüez	Puerto Rico	Mayagüez metro	Land-based
Holiday Inn Ponce & El Tropical Casino	Ponce	Puerto Rico	Ponce metro	Land-based
Hyatt Dorado Beach Resort & Casino Country Club	Dorado	Puerto Rico	SCG metro	Land-based
Oasis Casino at Embassy Suites Hotel & Casino	Carolina	Puerto Rico	SCG metro	Land-based
Ocean Casino at Courtyard by Marriott Aguadilla	Aguadilla	Puerto Rico	Aguadilla msa	Land-based
Mayagüez Resort & Casino	Mayagüez	Puerto Rico	Mayagüez metro	Land-based
Ponce Hilton & Casino	Ponce	Puerto Rico	Ponce metro	Land-based
Ponce Plaza Hotel & Casino	Ponce	Puerto Rico	Ponce metro	Land-based
Ritz-Carlton San Juan Hotel & Casino	Carolina	Puerto Rico	SCG metro	Land-based
San Juan Marriott Resort & Stellaris Casino	San Juan	Puerto Rico	SCG metro	Land-based
Wyndham Rio Mar Beach Resort, Country Club & Casino	Rio Grande	Puerto Rico	SCG metro	Land-based Formerly Westin

One must be 18 to enter a casino in Puerto Rico (18 is the legal gambling age), ID is needed for locals, and tourists need to show a passport to enter.

== See also ==
- List of companies of Puerto Rico
- List of hotels in Puerto Rico
- List of casinos in the United States
- Tourism in Puerto Rico
