= Cerro de Punta =

Highest peak in Puerto Rico

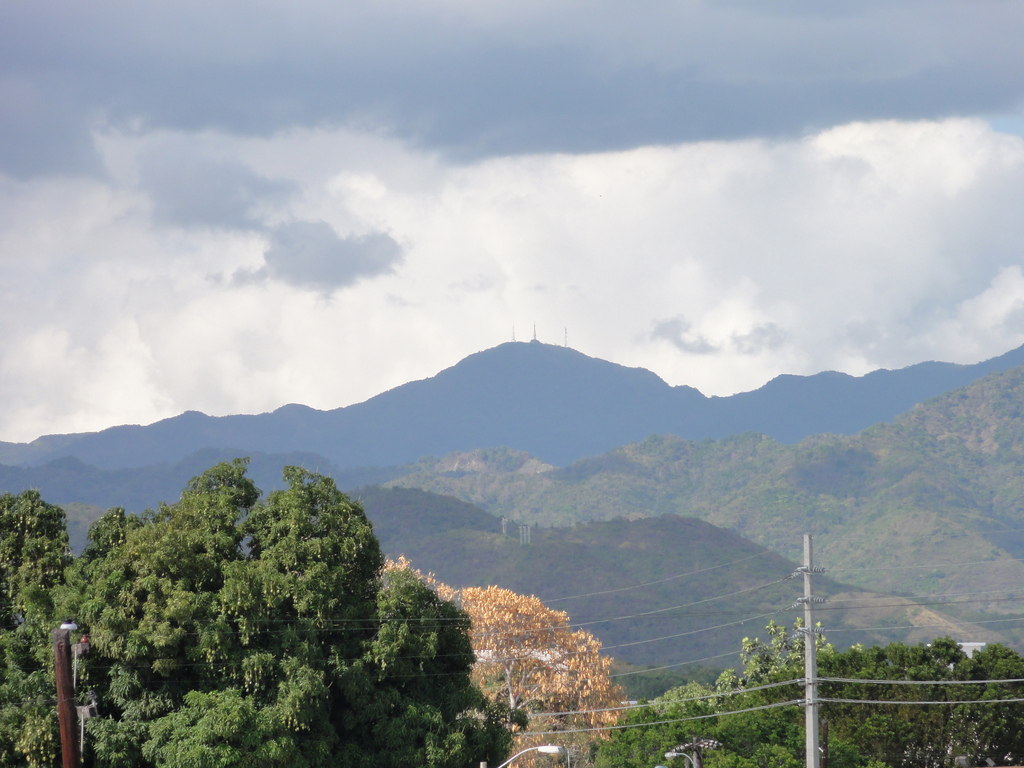
- Cerro de Punta from Museo de Arte de Ponce, Ponce, Puerto Rico

Highest point
- Elevation: 4,389 ft (1,338 m)
- Prominence: 4,389 ft (1,338 m)
- Listing: Ribu; North America isolated peaks 43rd
- Coordinates: 18°10′21″N 66°35′31″W

Geography
- Location within Puerto Rico
- Location: Ponce, Puerto Rico and Jayuya, Puerto Rico
- Parent range: Cordillera Central

Climbing
- Easiest route: PR-143

Cerro de Punta or Cerro Punta (Spanish for 'point hill' or 'hill point', respectively) is the highest peak in Puerto Rico, rising to 1,338 meters (4,390 ft) above sea level. (Note: As of February, 1981, the US Geological Survey reports the height as 1,328 meters. (See: Geographic Names Information System: Feature Query Results. United States Geological Survey. 13-FEB-1981. Retrieved 22 August 2013.) However, Gousha (1995) and Metrodata (1998) report the height as 1,338 meters. (See: Las cumbres más altas de Puerto Rico. Universidad Interamericana de Puerto Rico en Bayamon. Departamento de Ciencias Naturales y Matematicas. Retrieved 22 August 2013.)) The mountain is part of the Cordillera Central and is located on the municipal boundary between Ponce and Jayuya in the central region of the main island of Puerto Rico.

== Location ==
The mountain is part of the Cordillera Central and is located on the border between the municipalities of Ponce and Jayuya. The access road to the point closest to the highest elevation is from PR-143 on the borders of those municipalities. It is located within the boundaries of the Toro Negro State Forest and Nature Reserve, and it has been described as "an alpine runt." The mountain is just north of east-to-westbound Route 143. It is located at coordinates 18.172458 and -66.591839W. The nearest populated place to Cerro de Punta is Urbanización Vega Linda, located 3.3 miles (5.3 km) away.

== Geology ==
Unlike many Caribbean mountains, Cerro de Punta is not a volcano but simply the highest point in the Cordillera Central. Cordillera Central is the central mountain range that divides the island by running in an east–west fashion.

== Panoramic view ==
The view from atop Cerro de Punta is said to be "the best view in all of Puerto Rico". On a clear day, it is possible to see virtually the entire island, including as far as San Juan, which is over 75 miles (120 km) away. There are a number of radio and television transmission and re-transmission towers just off the top of the mountain. There is an observation platform at the top of the mountain.

== Wildlife and flora ==
The mountain is home to an abundant amount of wildlife, lush vegetation, flowering shrubs and trees, and numerous waterfalls. The mountain is covered by Sierra palm trees. Various plants, including some endangered species are found here, such as the endangered fern Elaphoglossum serpens which is found only on this mountain and nowhere else in the world, and Cook's holly (Ilex cookii) or planta de te, which is only found here and in neighboring Mount Jayuya.

== Nearby roads ==
The area consists of many steep mountains. The nearest road is PR-143, which is a winding two-lane mountain road that must be travelled very slowly as it is not possible to see traffic coming from the opposite direction for any significant length. Off Route 143 is the road that actually leads to the mountain's top. Route 143 can be accessed via the better-traveled Route 10. Route 143 is part of the Ruta Panorámica.

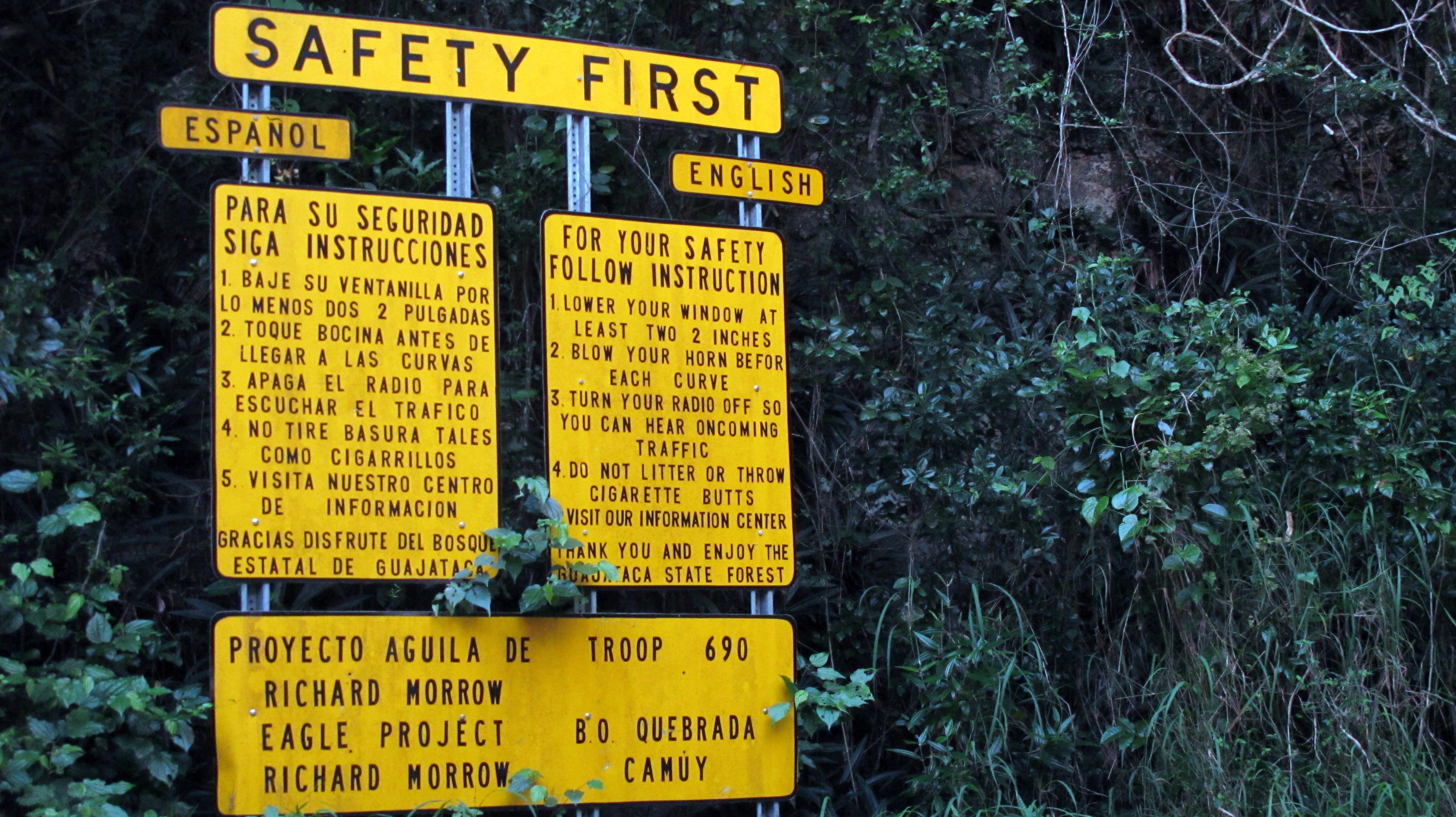
Driving in mountain roads tips

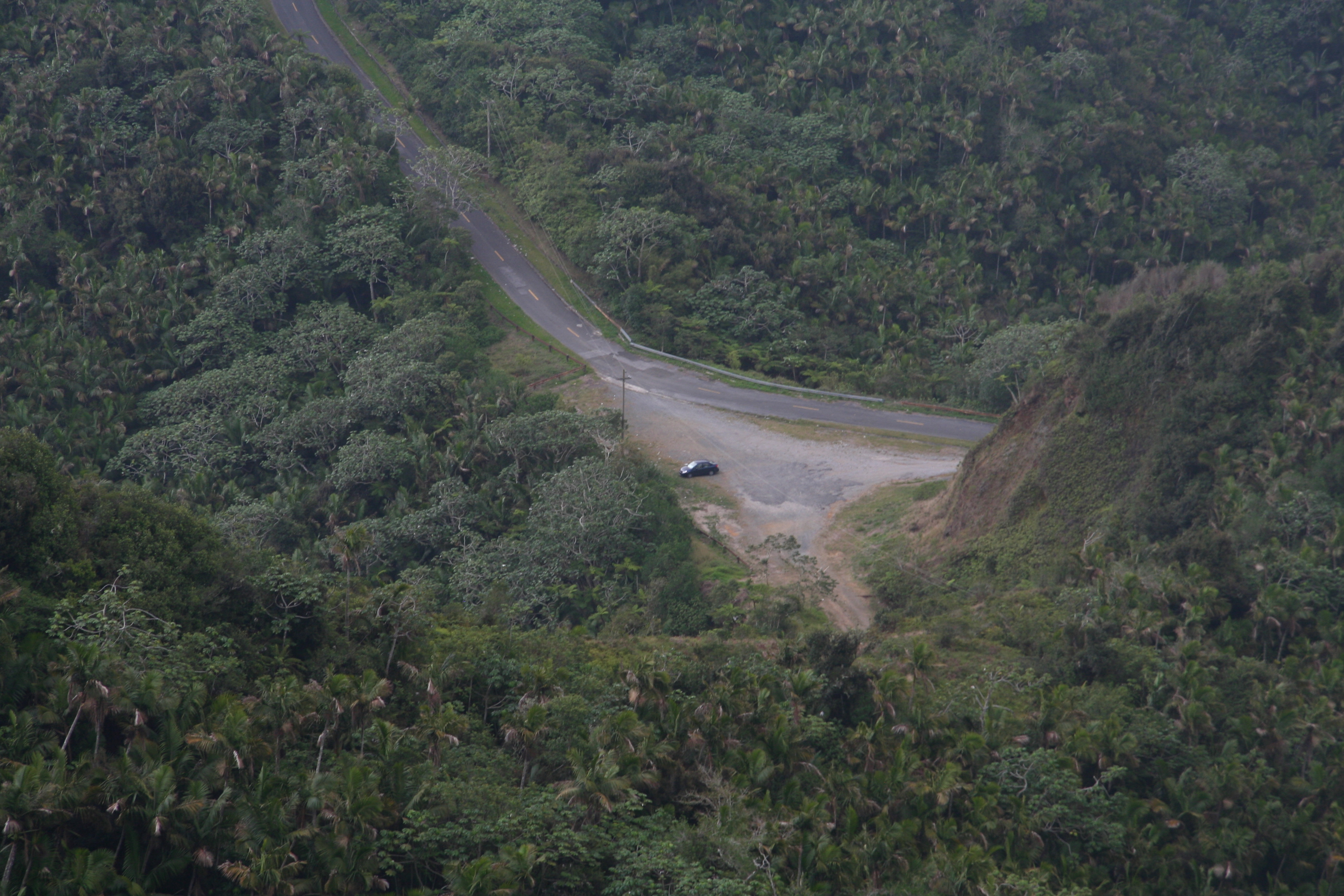
View of roadway from Cerro de Punta

== Hiking and access trail ==
A nearby inn called Hacienda Gripiñas, has a trail that leads to the top of the mountain. Hacienda Gripiñas was a coffee plantation, but has been turned into a country inn. In 2010 it still grew some coffee. The inn operates under a contract with the Government of Puerto Rico. The trails, however, are not well marked and often suffer damage from storms. While people can hike their way to the top of the mountain, there is a paved road that leads to the very summit. The Toro Negro State Forest has 12 miles (19 km) of hiking trails some of which lead to the top of Cerro de Punta.

Cerro Puntas (Climate - Sub-Tropical Highland (Cfb))

Climate chart (precipitation, max. and min. temperature)
J	F	M	A	M	J	J	A	S	O	N	D
3.4 66 41	2.7 68 41	2.8 68 47	6.1 69 56	12 73 61	7.8 75 62	11 76 62	13 78 62	10 75 62	9.9 76 61	13 70 56	7.7 65 46
- █ Average max. and min. temperatures in °F
- █ Precipitation totals in inches
Metric conversion
J	F	M	A	M	J	J	A	S	O	N	D
86 19 5	69 20 5	71 20 8	154 21 13	311 23 16	199 24 17	285 24 17	335 26 17	257 24 17	251 24 16	318 21 14	196 18 8
- █ Average max. and min. temperatures in °C
- █ Precipitation totals in mm

== Gallery ==
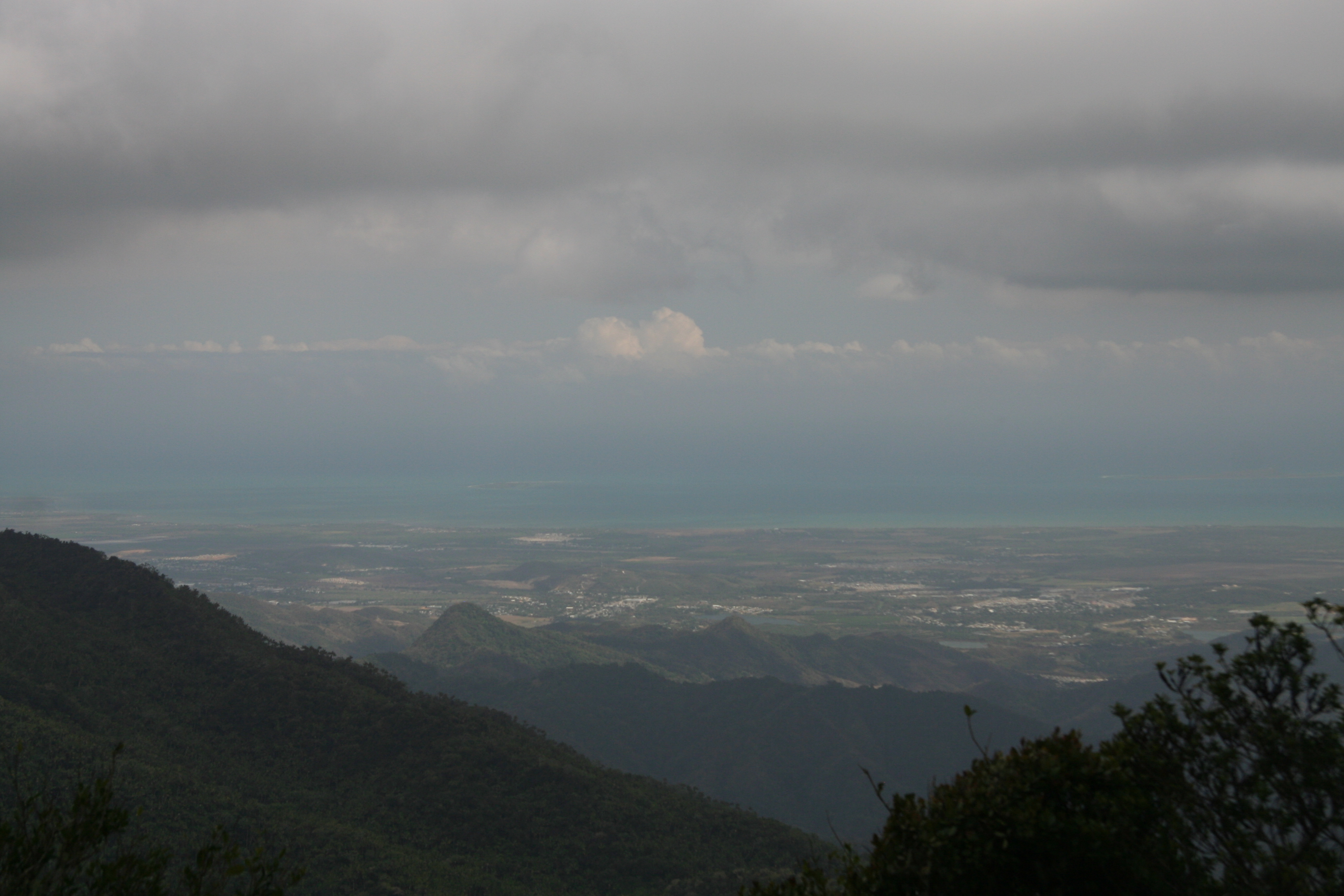
View from Cerro de Punta, highest point in Puerto Rico

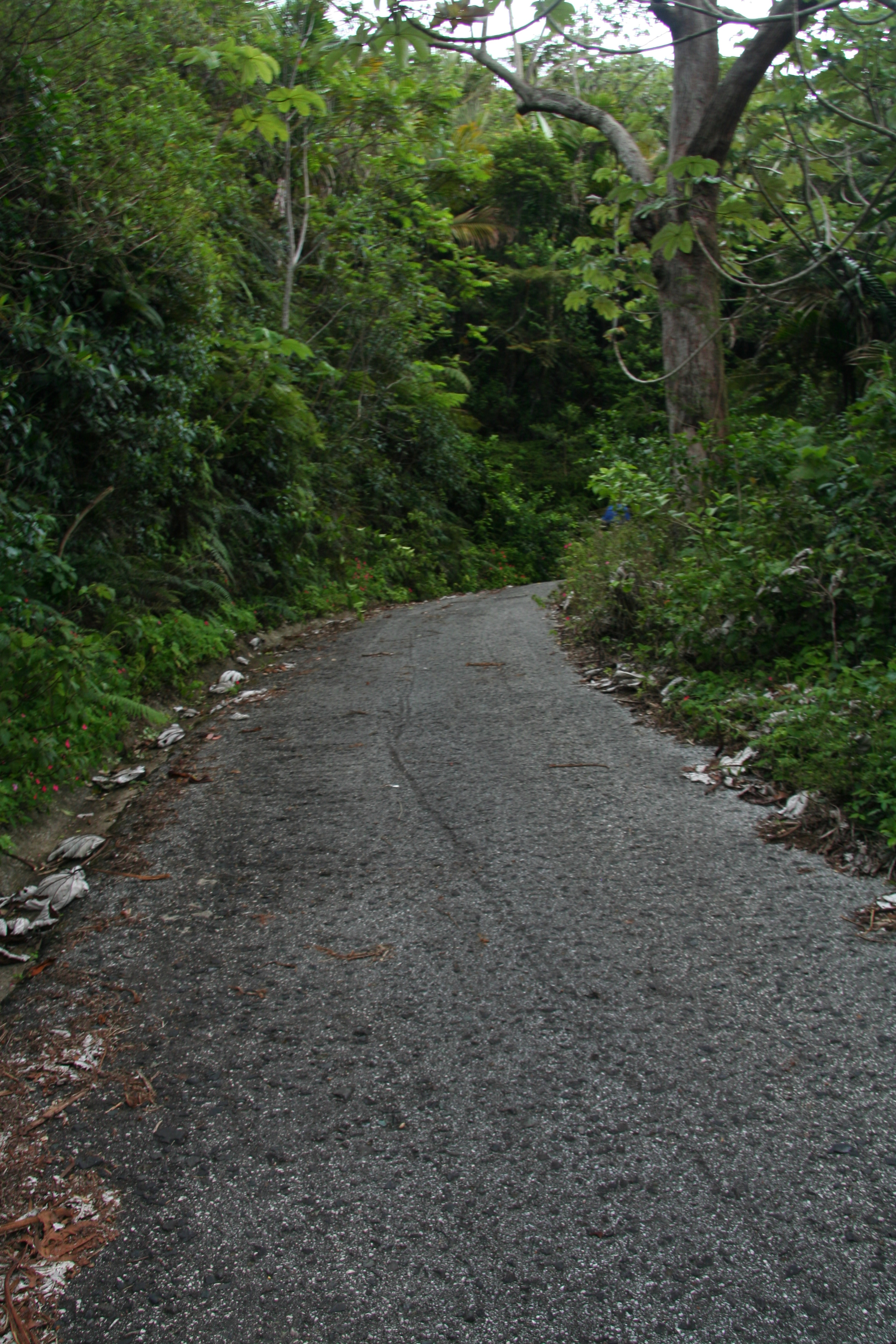
Paved road for climbing up to Cerro de Punta

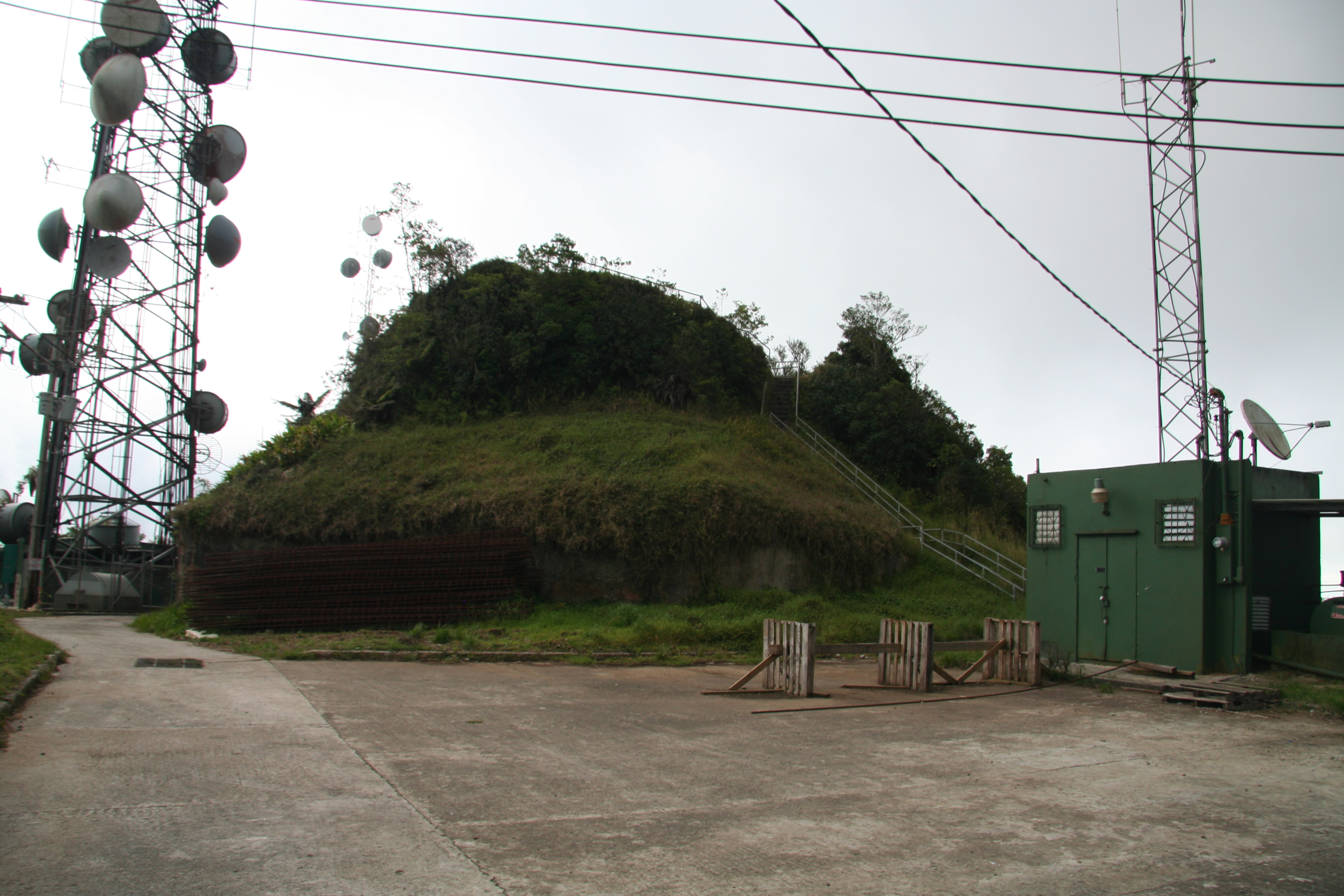
Antennas at Cerro de Punta

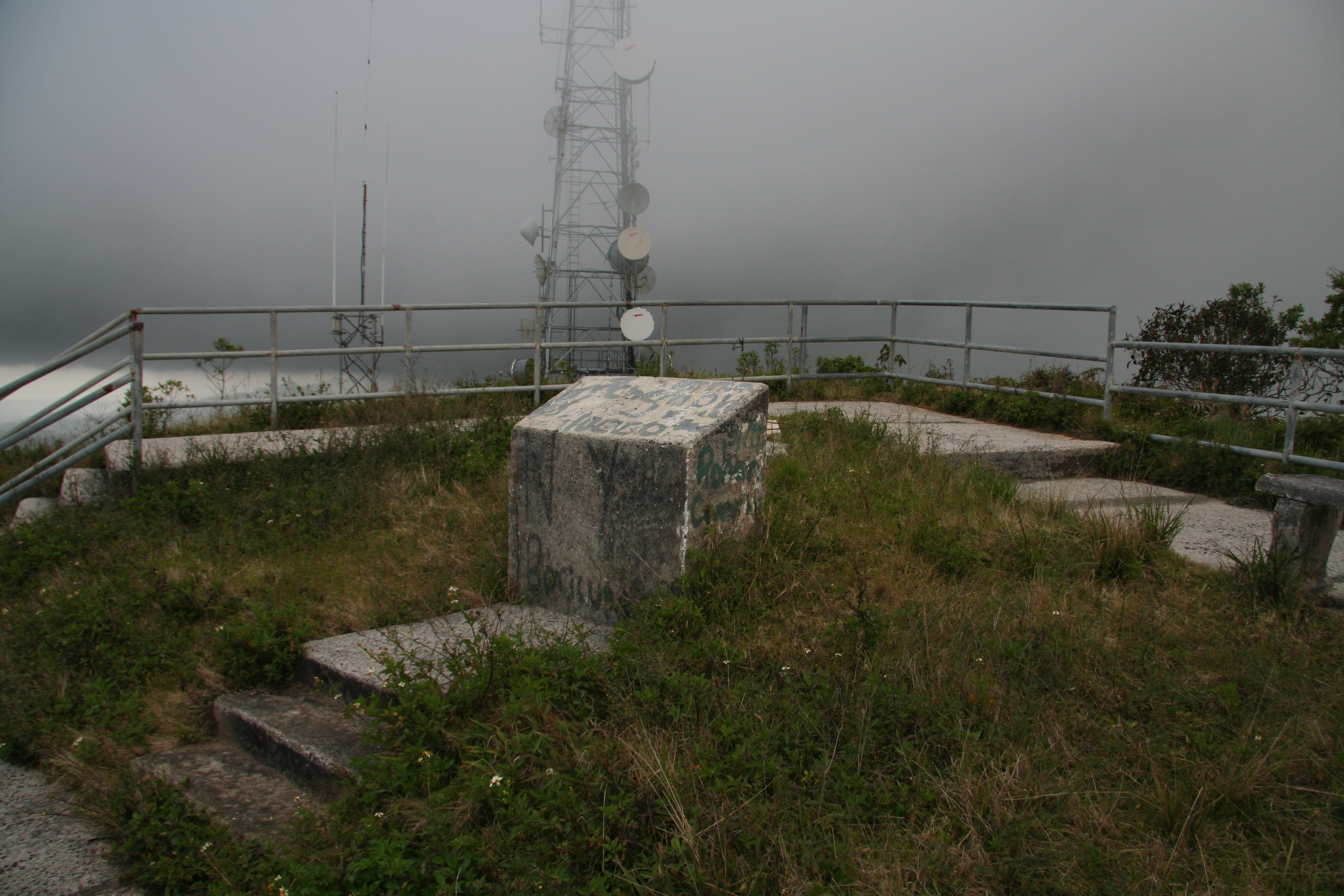
Lookout area at Cerro de Punta's summit

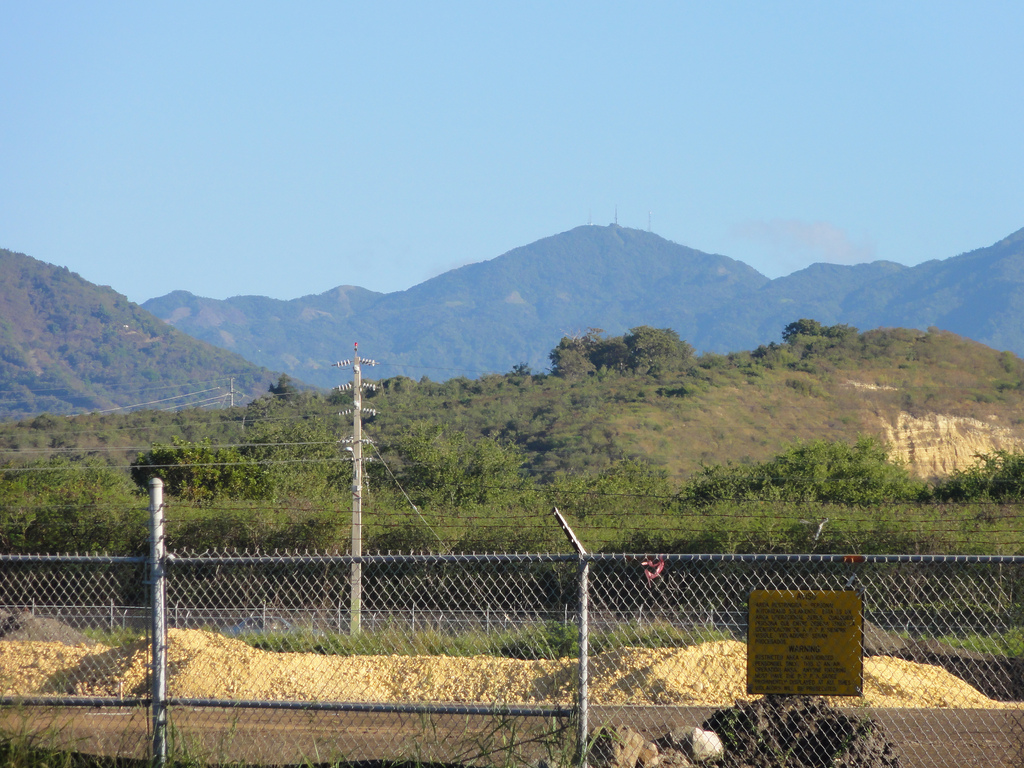
Cerro de Punta as seen from Mercedita Airport, Ponce, Puerto Rico

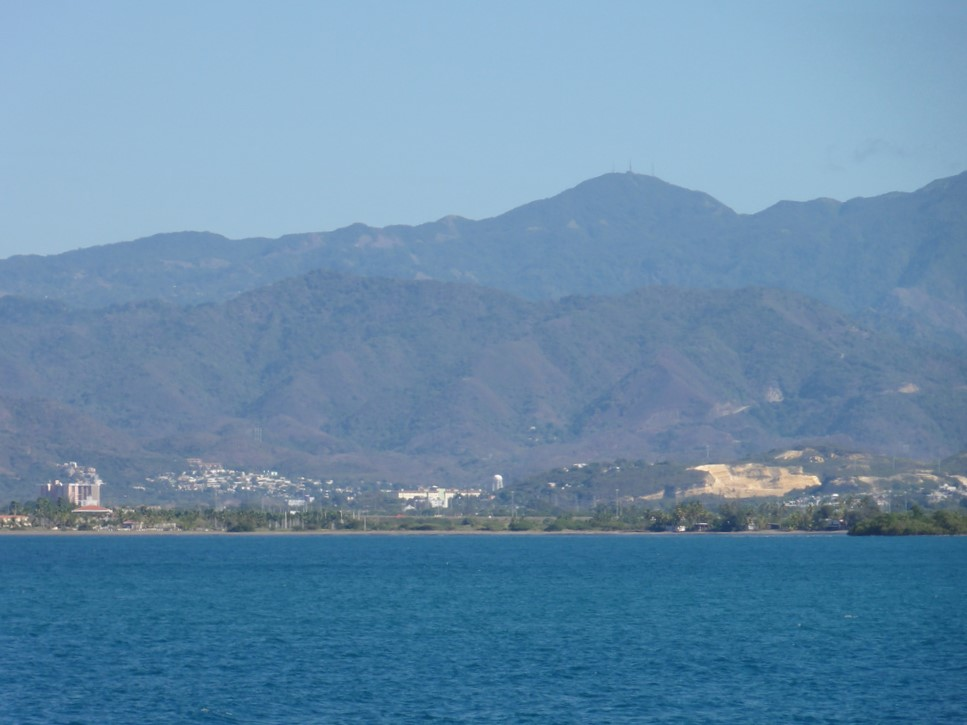
Cerro de Punta as seen from Caja de Muertos, Ponce, Puerto Rico

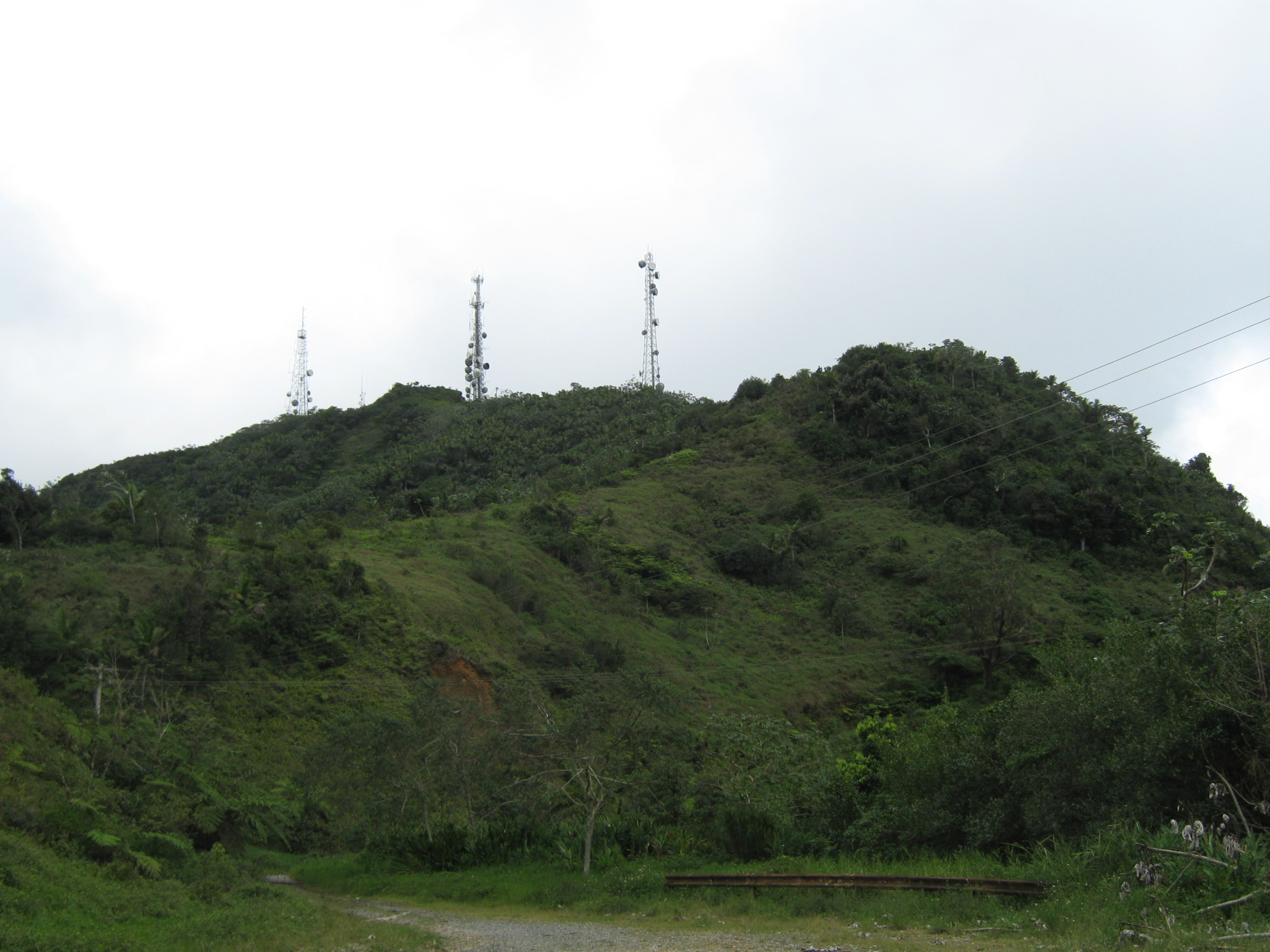
Cerro de Punta as viewed from Ruta Panorámica

== See also ==
- List of mountain peaks of the Caribbean
- List of mountain peaks of the United States
- List of U.S. states by elevation
