= Hacienda Juanita =

Historic coffee plantation and estate in Maricao, Puerto Rico

Coordinates: 18°10′44″N 66°59′36″W

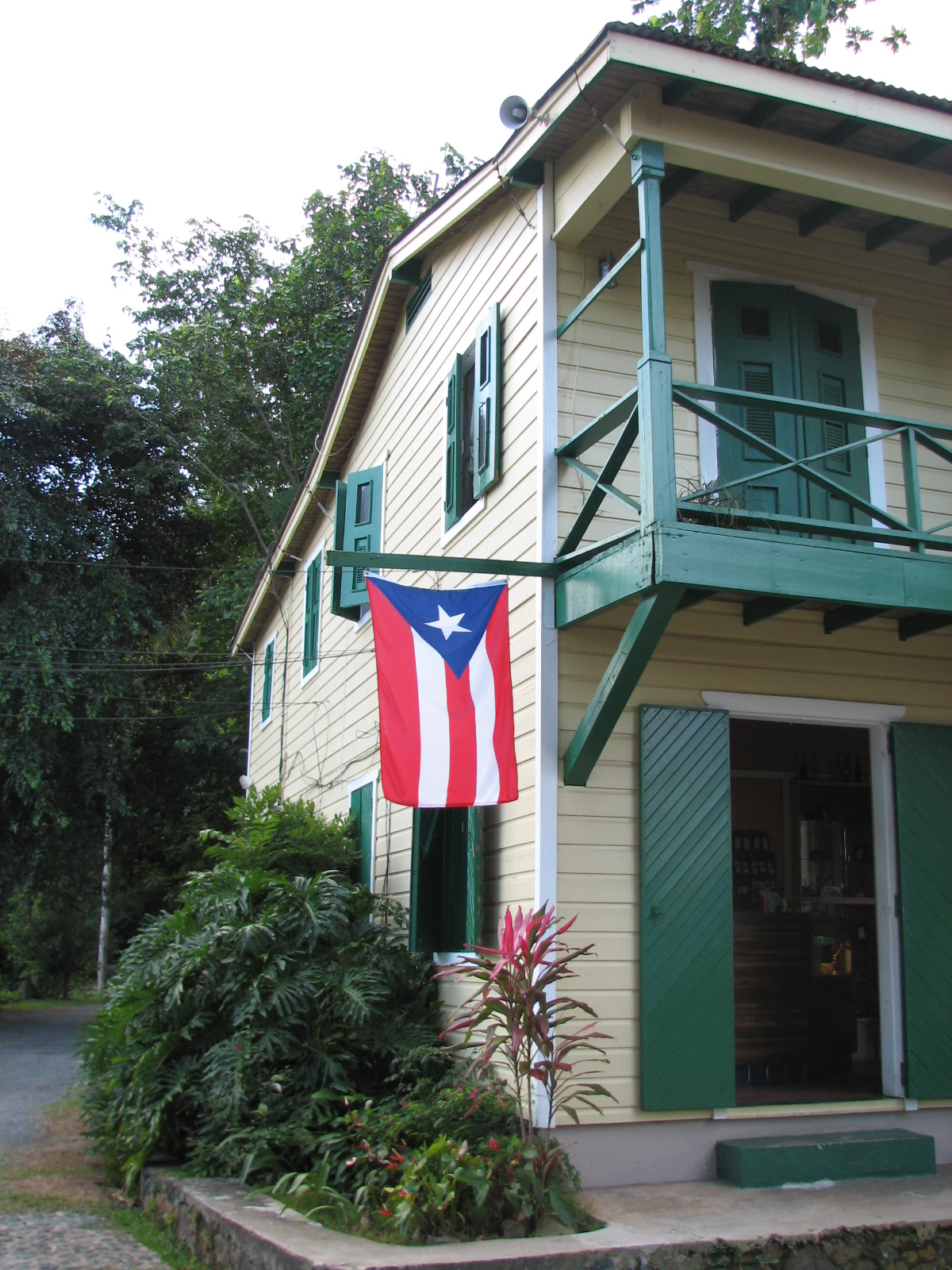
- Interactive map of Hacienda Juanita
- Location: Hwy 105 km 23.5 Maricao, Puerto Rico 00606
- Opened: 1976
- Theme: Agricultural Complex
- No. of rooms: 21
- Signature attractions: Sala del Parador; The Forest
- Notable restaurants: La Casona de Juanita
- Casino type: Land
- Owner: Hacienda Juanita
- Website: Hacienda Juanita Website

Hacienda Juanita (built 1833-34) is a coffee plantation hacienda in the town of Maricao, Puerto Rico. The design is based on typical Puerto Rican culture, and was commissioned by the wife of a Spanish official. Coffee production at the hacienda declined from the 1960s.

== Hotel ==
From 1976 it was converted, with government assistance, into one of Puerto Rico's earliest paradores, and ran, administered by the Puerto Rico Tourism Company, as a 21-room agro-hotel. At 1,600 ft (490 m) above sea level, visitors could enjoy the view and the peacefulness of the Puerto Rican mountains. The parador passed to new private owners in 2005 but closed in 2011. The hotel had hosted a Sala del Parador, a permanent exhibit of antique artifacts related to Puerto Rican coffee production.

== Flora and fauna ==
The 24 acres (97,000 m^{2}) of lands are home to a number of floral and animal species including:

- Puerto Rican owl
- Puerto Rican lizard cuckoo
- Puerto Rican woodpecker
- Puerto Rican emerald
- Green mango
- Puerto Rican tody
- Loggerhead kingbird
- Puerto Rican flycatcher
- Eastern red-legged thrush
- Puerto Rican oriole
- Antillean euphonia
- Puerto Rican spindalis
- Puerto Rican tanager
- Puerto Rican bullfinch

== Nearby attractions ==
- Centro Vacacional Monte del Estado
- Maricao Fish Hatchery
- Maricao State Forest (Monte del Estado)

== See also ==
- List of hotels in Puerto Rico
