= Hacienda El Jibarito =

Agro-hotel in San Sebastián, Puerto Rico

- Interactive map of Hacienda El Jibarito
- Location: Hwy 445 km 6.5 Interior, Bo. Saltos II San Sebastián, PR 00685; 18.3772°N 67.0292°W
- Opened: 2004
- Theme: Agricultural Complex
- No. of rooms: 19
- Signature attractions: Colonial Square; Greenhouses; The Farm
- Notable restaurants: El Alambique Bar & Grill; Hotel Restaurant; Traditional Café
- Casino type: Land
- Owner: Hacienda el Jibarito
- Website: Hacienda El Jibarito Website

Hacienda El Jibarito is a 19-room agro-hotel located in San Sebastián, Puerto Rico designed to attract people to appreciate the countryside and historic elements of Puerto Rico. It is isolated within the mountainous central region of the island and offers its visitors the chance learn more about Puerto Rican culture through typical clothing, music, and cuisine.

== Attractions ==
- Colonial Square (Placita Colonial) is a colonial square where visitors can enjoy products cultivated in the hacienda's farm.
- Greenhouses (Invernaderos) - visitors can learn more about how some products are produced in an artificial microclimate.
- The Farm (Ranchos) - visitors can tour the farm where the hacienda's animals are raised.

A nearby waterfall in the hacienda grounds is another place of interest for visitors and tourists.

== See also ==
- List of hotels in Puerto Rico
