= Condado Vanderbilt Hotel =

Historic luxury hotel in San Juan, Puerto Rico

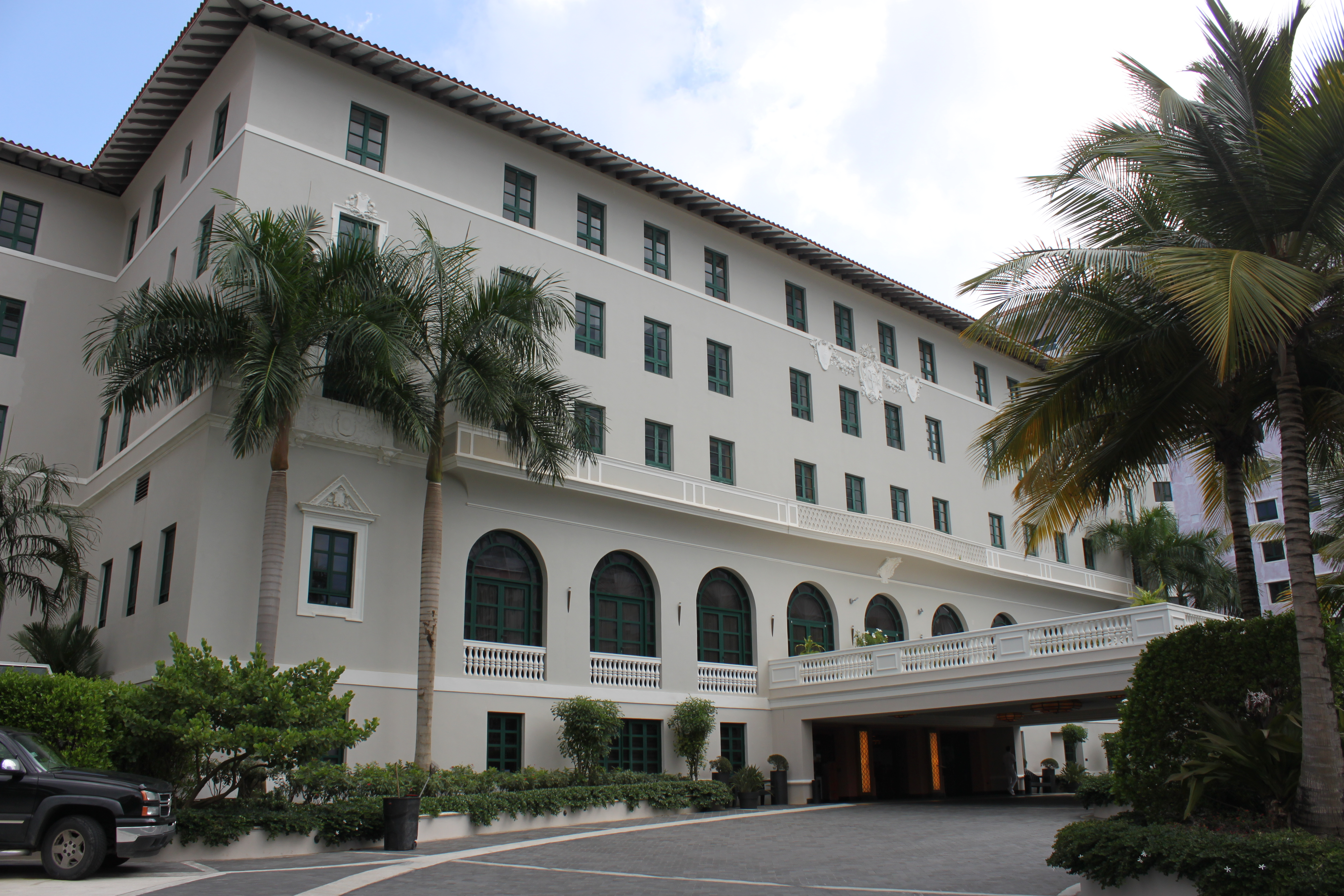
- Condado Vanderbilt Hotel in 2014
- Interactive map of the Condado Vanderbilt Hotel area

General information
- Status: Completed
- Type: Hotel
- Architectural style: Mission/Spanish Revival
- Location: 1055 Ashford Avenue, Condado, San Juan, Puerto Rico; 00907
- Coordinates: 18°27′30.9″N 66°4′33.9″W
- Named for: Condado and Vanderbilt family
- Construction started: 1917
- Opened: 16 October 1919; 106 years ago
- Cost: $1,000,000 in 1917 (Note: equivalent to $25,129,870 in 2025)
- Owner: Paulson & Co. (majority owner), International Hospitality Enterprises
- Operator: International Hospitality Enterprises
- Affiliation: Historic Hotels of America

Height
- Height: 18 metres (59 ft) (main building), 43 metres (141 ft) (2 towers)

Technical details
- Floor count: 5 (main building), 12 (2 towers)

Design and construction
- Architect: Warren and Wetmore
- Other designers: Sacmag Architects (c. 1962, demolished 2003), Toro & Ferrer Architects (1976, demolished 2001)

Other information
- Number of rooms: 217 (guest rooms); 100 suites
- Number of restaurants: Four (STK San Juan; 1919 Restaurant; Ola Ocean Front Bistro; Tacos & Tequila)
- Number of bars: Four (VC Lounge & Cocktail Bar; Veritas Wine and Cognac Bar; Marabar Martini Bar and Lounge; Avo Lounge)
- Parking: Valet parking

Website
- Official website
- Condado Vanderbilt Hotel
- U.S. National Register of Historic Places
- NRHP reference No.: 08001110
- Added to NRHP: 25 November 2008

The Condado Vanderbilt Hotel is a historic luxury hotel built in 1919 and located on Ashford Avenue in the district of Condado in San Juan, the capital city of the U.S. territory of Puerto Rico. It was listed on the National Register of Historic Places in 2008. The hotel was designed by the architectural firm Warren and Wetmore, who also designed New York's Grand Central Terminal. It was built by the Vanderbilt family and it marked the beginning of high end tourism in Puerto Rico.

== History ==
=== Early years ===
Construction of the Condado Vanderbilt Hotel was begun in 1917 by Frederick William Vanderbilt, the son of William Henry Vanderbilt. He selected the prominent architectural firm of Warren and Wetmore, which had designed New York City's Grand Central Terminal, as well as the Biltmore, Commodore, and Ambassador Hotels. On 16 October 1919, the hotel, having cost a million dollars to construct, was inaugurated. It was suggested that the early Spanish Revival style architecture be used by Fredrick Vanderbilt. Capitalizing on the property's setting adjacent to the Atlantic Ocean, the designers created a Beaux Arts-style structure with white walls, red tiles, French windows, lofty ceilings and other design details typical of the style at the time. The original roofing featured antique Spanish tiles sourced from Puerto Rico's older Spanish buildings. The floors and the public areas including the main staircase were decorated with marble and mosaics and the area between the ocean and the hotel building was developed to help the building withstand damage from the Atlantic coast. The hotel also featured a flagstone paved terrace. Giant pandanus, several kinds of bougainvillea, fruit trees and coconut palms could also be found in the hotel's gardens.

The Condado Vanderbilt was the first luxury hotel to open in Puerto Rico and was also the first hotel in Puerto Rico to have a casino after gambling was legalized in 1940. Among the famous guests to have stayed at the Condado Vanderbilt are the former Presidents of the United States John F. Kennedy and Franklin Roosevelt and Roosevelt's wife Eleanor, the American aviator Charles Lindbergh, composer José Luis Moneró, singer-songwriter Carlos Gardel, Hollywood actor Errol Flynn, comedian Bob Hope, and pianist Arthur Rubinstein. Activities that were available included American golf, tennis and motoring among other things. These were advertised in various American newspapers during the 1920s.

=== Expansion ===
Manuel Gonzalez bought the hotel from the Vanderbilts during The Great Depression in 1930, and changed its name to the Condado Hotel. In the 1940s, the hotel's East Wing was built, a five-story L-shaped addition, containing additional guest rooms and public areas. In the 1950s, after a series of changes in ownership, the name was changed to the Condado Beach Hotel. In 1962, another addition was built on the other side of the hotel, the West Wing, a nine-story concrete structure containing 156 air-conditioned guest rooms, all facing the sea.

=== Difficult Years ===
In the early 1970s, with the hotel threatened with demolition, governor Luis A. Ferré issued an executive order, declaring the structure a cultural heritage site. In 1973, the Condado Beach Hotel was united with the adjacent La Concha Hotel into one resort, known as the Hyatt Puerto Rico. The 1940s East Wing of the Condado Beach Hotel was demolished in 1975 and a huge convention wing was built in its place, joining the Condado Beach and La Concha Hotels into one physical complex. In 1976, with construction complete, management of the complex was taken over by Hilton International and it was renamed the Condado Beach La Concha Convention Center. Management later transferred to Carnival Cruise Line, which renamed the resort The Condado Beach Trio. The La Concha Hotel wing closed in 1995 and the state-owned hotel was known in its final years as The Condado Beach Hotel & Casino, before the entire complex closed on June 30, 1997, as it was losing $7 million a year. The properties sat vacant for many years, and the La Concha and Condado Beach Hotels were finally severed in 2004. The convention center that joined them was demolished to build a public park.

=== Restoration ===
In 1997, the administration of Pedro Rosselló proposed that the Condado area be redeveloped. Brian McLaughlin suggested renovating and expanding the hotel, but then-San Juan mayor Sila M. Calderon challenged the proposal in court. This led to the hotel being abandoned until 2002 when she finally agreed. Having been abandoned for seven years, the hotel's renovation was finally undertaken at a cost of US$270 million in 2003. The goal was to transform it into a five-star hotel with resemblance to the original 1919 structure. The 1962 West Wing was demolished in 2003, in preparation for this work. The remaining original 1919 central hotel structure was listed on the National Register of Historic Places in 2008.

On 16 October 2012, after ten years and 53,441 hours of renovations, two years longer than originally planned, a part of the renovated hotel comprising several new banquet halls, bars and restaurants was finally opened for business. On December 1, 2014, the newly built 11-story twin towers on either side of the central structure were opened. The renovated rooms are 17 feet wide with high ceilings. The bathrooms have double sinks and both a shower and tub. The original staircases, however, remain in place. The remodeling was handled by a team led by Hugh Andrews and Jorge Rossello.

Among the newly built restaurants, "1919", "Tacos & Tequila by Patron", "Veritas", "Marabar" and "Avo Lounge"; "1919" has been credited as "Puerto Rico's finest restaurant" by Turismo, the Puerto Rico Tourism Company.

== In popular culture ==
The hotel was one of the main filming locations of the 1976 teen comedy musical, La Pandilla en Apuros.

== Gallery ==
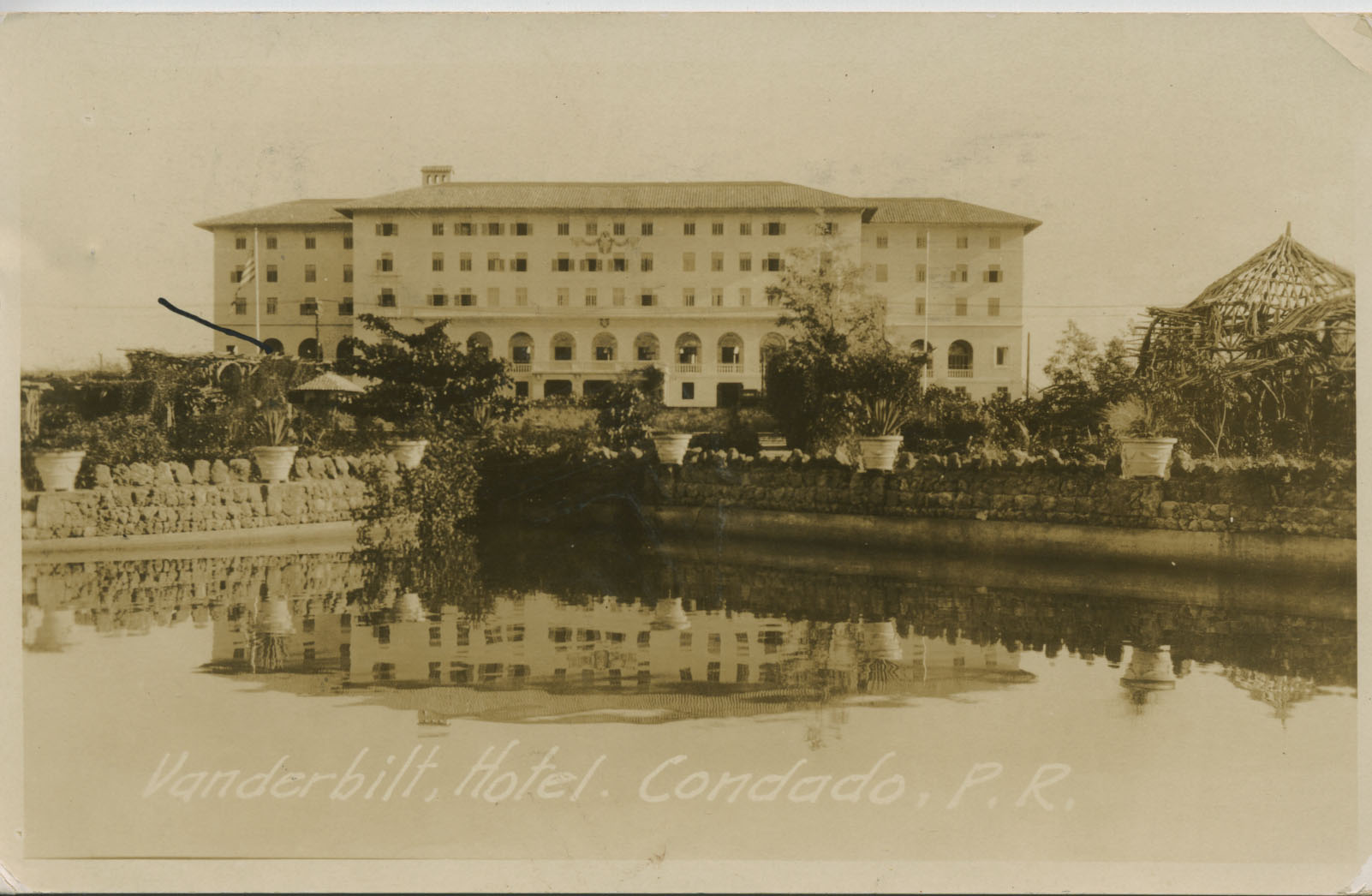
Vanderbilt Hotel, circa 1925

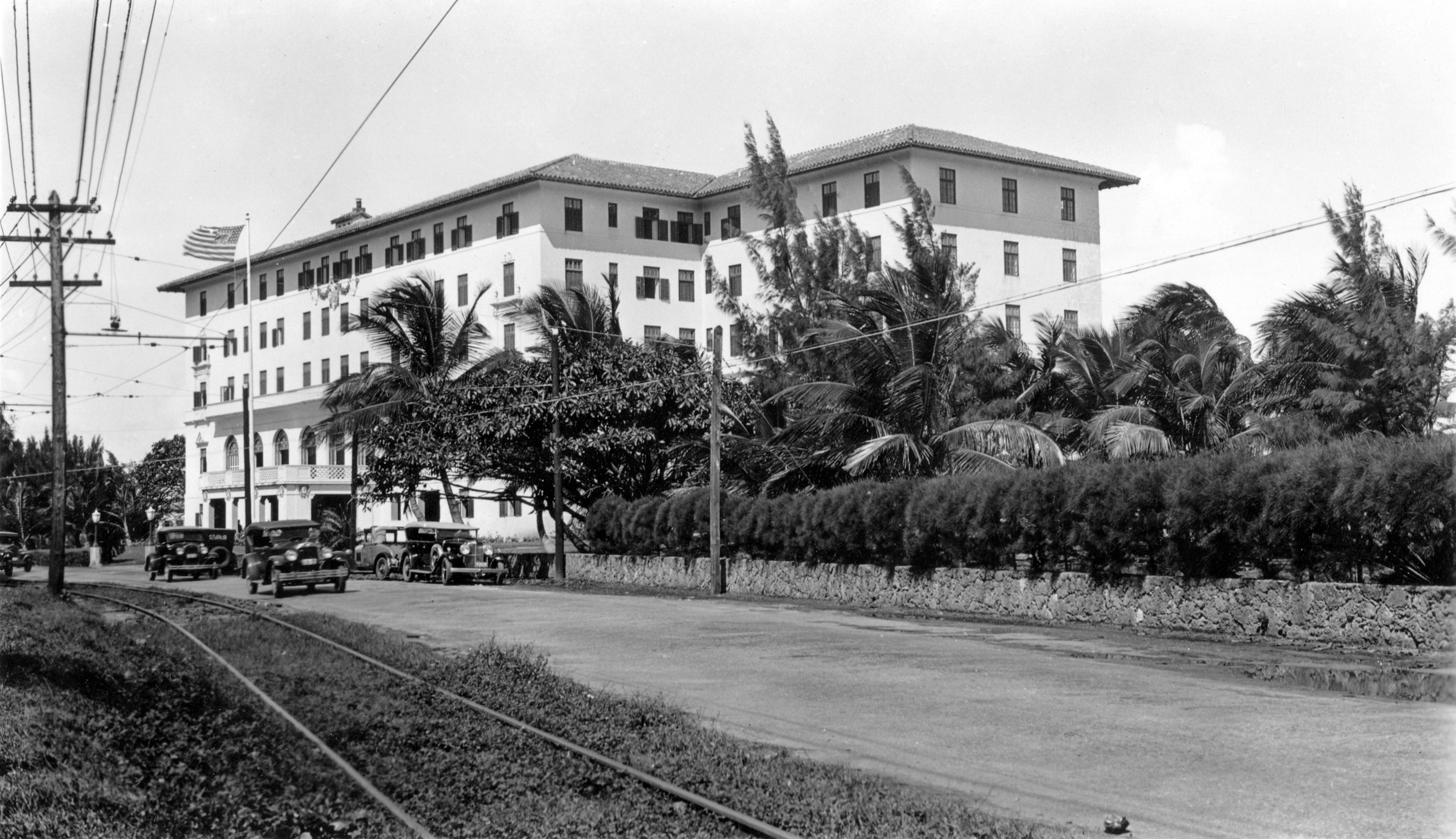
Hotel Condado, 1932

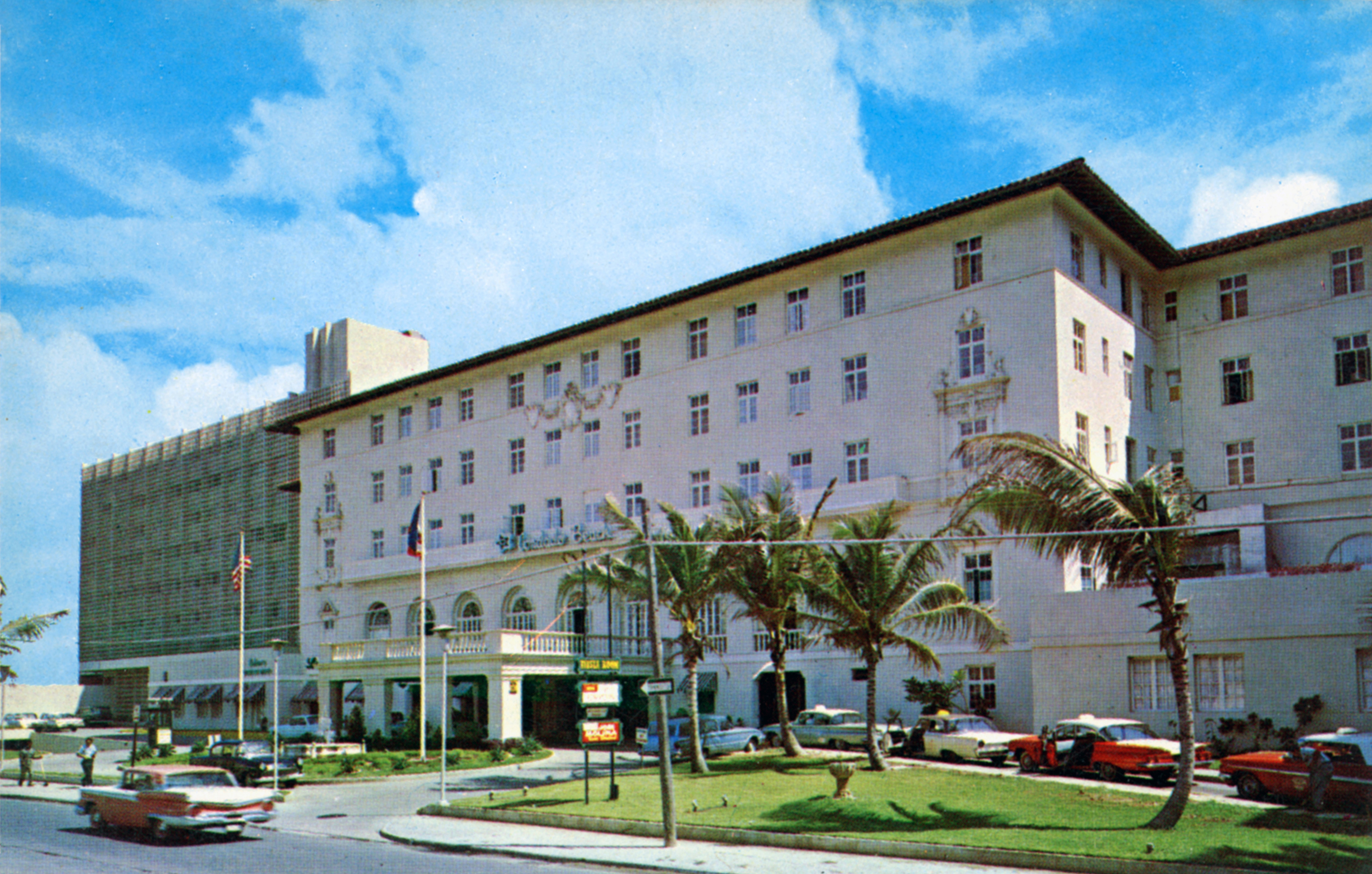
Concado Beach Hotel, 1950s

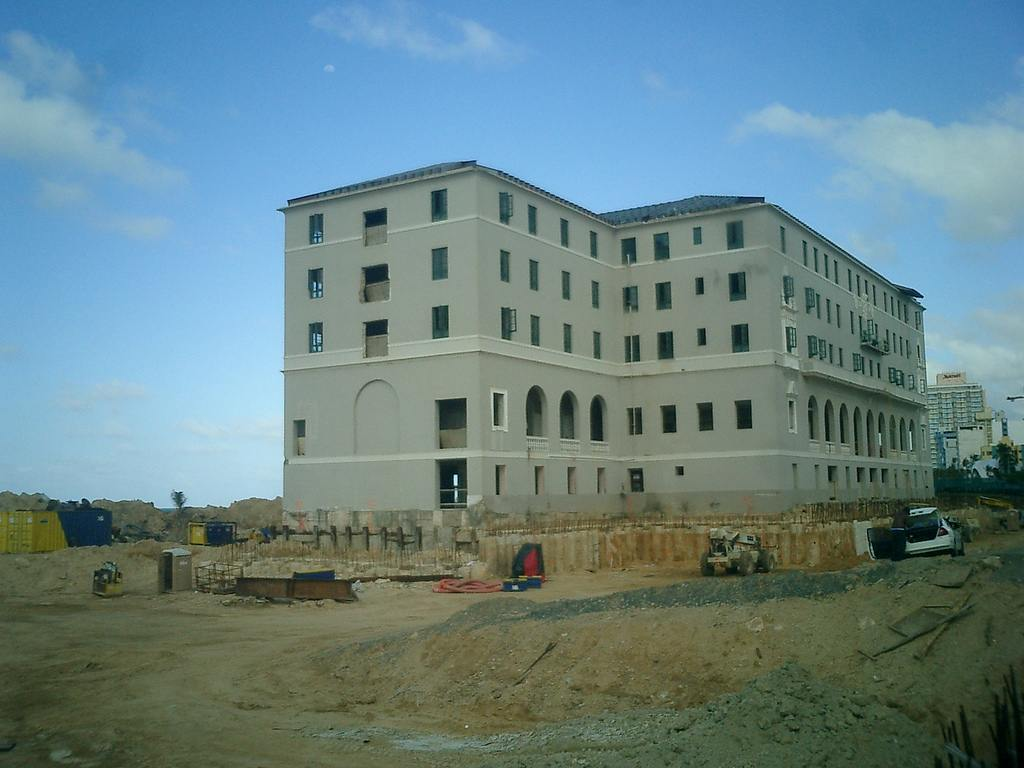
The Condado Vanderbilt Hotel under expansion in 2006

== See also ==
- Tourism in the United States
- Tourism in Puerto Rico
- List of hotels in Puerto Rico
- National Register of Historic Places listings in metropolitan San Juan, Puerto Rico
