= El Blok Hotel =

Coordinates: 18.0952°N 65.4716°W

El Blok Hotel is a boutique eco-friendly hotel in Esperanza, Puerto Rico. Opened in 2014, it was designed by Fuster + Partners and incorporates sustainable building methods and locally influenced features, including a restaurant formerly led by chef José Enrique.

== History ==
El Blok Hotel, located in Esperanza, Puerto Rico, was envisioned as a boutique eco-friendly hotel designed to promote sustainable tourism. The project was initiated by Simon Baeyertz, a former music industry executive, who collaborated with Puerto Rican architects and consultants. Financing for the project was secured through the Puerto Rico Economic Development Bank, which supported it for its anticipated economic and environmental benefits.

The hotel was originally slated to open in December 2012, offering 21 rooms, including standard, deluxe, and accessible options. Its design incorporated features such as solar energy systems and water recycling technologies to minimize its environmental footprint. Delays led to its opening in September 2014 with a revised design that included 22 rooms. The hotel was part of broader efforts to address Vieques’ limited hospitality offerings, which faced challenges from restricted transportation and infrastructure.

== Architecture ==
El Blok Hotel was designed by the San Juan-based architecture firm Fuster + Partners. The building features a modernist design with glass-reinforced concrete panels that incorporate intricate perforations to allow light and air to pass through while maintaining privacy and shading for the rooms. These panels also function as adjustable shutters for the guest room balconies.

A central light well runs through the building, connecting the rooftop to the lower floors. At its base is a living sculpture created by San Juan-based artists Javier and Jaime Suarez, made from materials such as coconut hair and mangrove moss. The hotel’s interior integrates local design elements, including painted tiles reminiscent of traditional Puerto Rican hydraulic tiles and a bar constructed from reclaimed almond wood.

The rooftop features a viewing deck and a small pool, designed to offer panoramic views of the sea and the island's interior. While the architecture emphasizes sustainability and integration with the local environment, some aspects, such as limited internet access in the rooms due to the thick concrete walls, have been noted as practical limitations.

== Restaurant ==
The hotel’s restaurant was led by chef José Enrique, who incorporated Puerto Rican cuisine. The offerings changed daily based on ingredients provided by local farmers and fishermen. Dishes included pork glazed with sugarcane and fish steamed in plantain leaves. Breakfast options included Puerto Rican coffee, house-made granola, and local fruits.

The dining area located on the open-air second floor is modeled after plazas of Puerto Rican towns. A central bar, constructed with reclaimed almond wood, serves as a centerpiece.
