= Veguitas, Jayuya, Puerto Rico =

Barrio of Puerto Rico

Veguitas
- Barrio
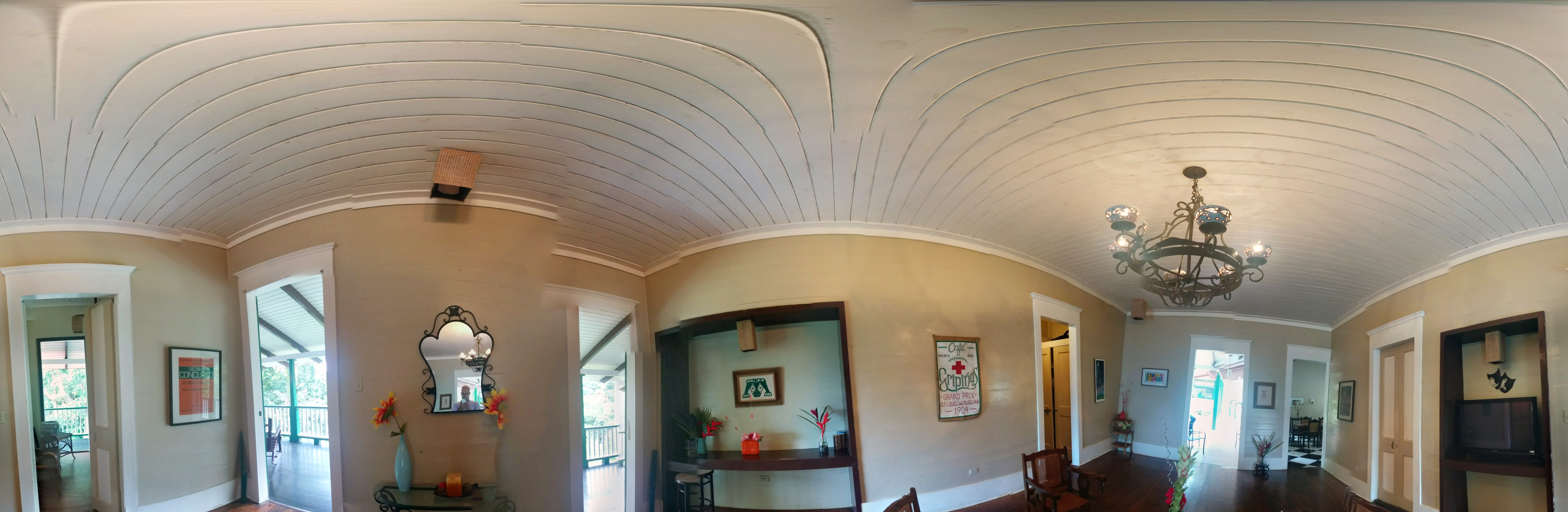
- Hacienda Gripiñas in Vequitas

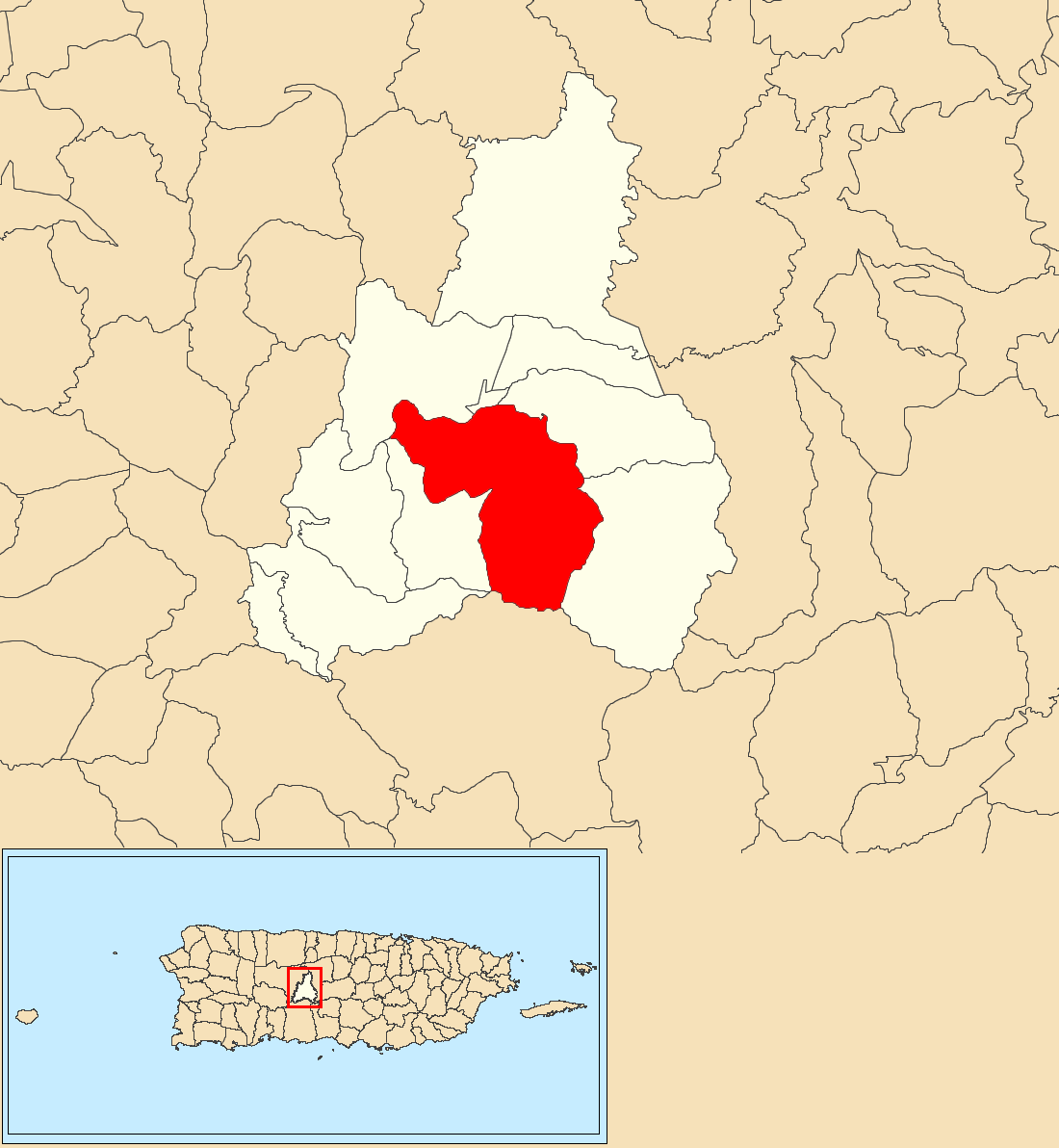
- Location of Veguitas within the municipality of Jayuya shown in red

- Location of Puerto Rico
- Coordinates: 18°11′45″N 66°35′14″W
- Commonwealth: Puerto Rico
- Municipality: Jayuya

Area
  - Total: 6.63 sq mi (17.2 km^{2})
  - Land: 6.63 sq mi (17.2 km^{2})
  - Water: 0.00 sq mi (0 km^{2})
- Elevation: 2,139 ft (652 m)

Population (2010)
  - Total: 3,685
  - Density: 555.8/sq mi (214.6/km^{2})
- Source: 2010 Census
- Time zone: UTC−4 (AST)
- ZIP Code: 00664
- Area code: 787/939

Veguitas is a barrio in the municipality of Jayuya, Puerto Rico. Its population in 2010 was 3,685.

Historical population
Census	Pop.	Note	%±
1950	2,570		—
1960	2,202		−14.3%
1970	0		−100.0%
1980	3,345		—
1990	3,782		13.1%
2000	3,964		4.8%
2010	3,685		−7.0%
U.S. Decennial Census; 1900 (N/A) 1910-1930; 1930-1950 1980-2000 2010

== See also ==
- List of communities in Puerto Rico
