= Barrios of San Juan, Puerto Rico =

San Juan (red) within Puerto Rico

The municipality of San Juan, the capital of the archipelago and island of Puerto Rico, is divided into 18 barrios, eight of the barrios are further divided into subbarrios or districts.

Originally, the municipality comprised San Juan Antiguo, which is congruent with San Juan Islet, where the Spanish Empire first established the capital city of Puerto Rico, San Juan Bautista de Puerto Rico (today Old San Juan historic quarter), in 1521. In 1862, San Juan acquired the barrio of Santurce, first part of the defunct municipality of San Mateo de Cangrejos. In 1951, it further acquired the defunct municipality of Río Piedras as 16 barrios.

== Barrios ==
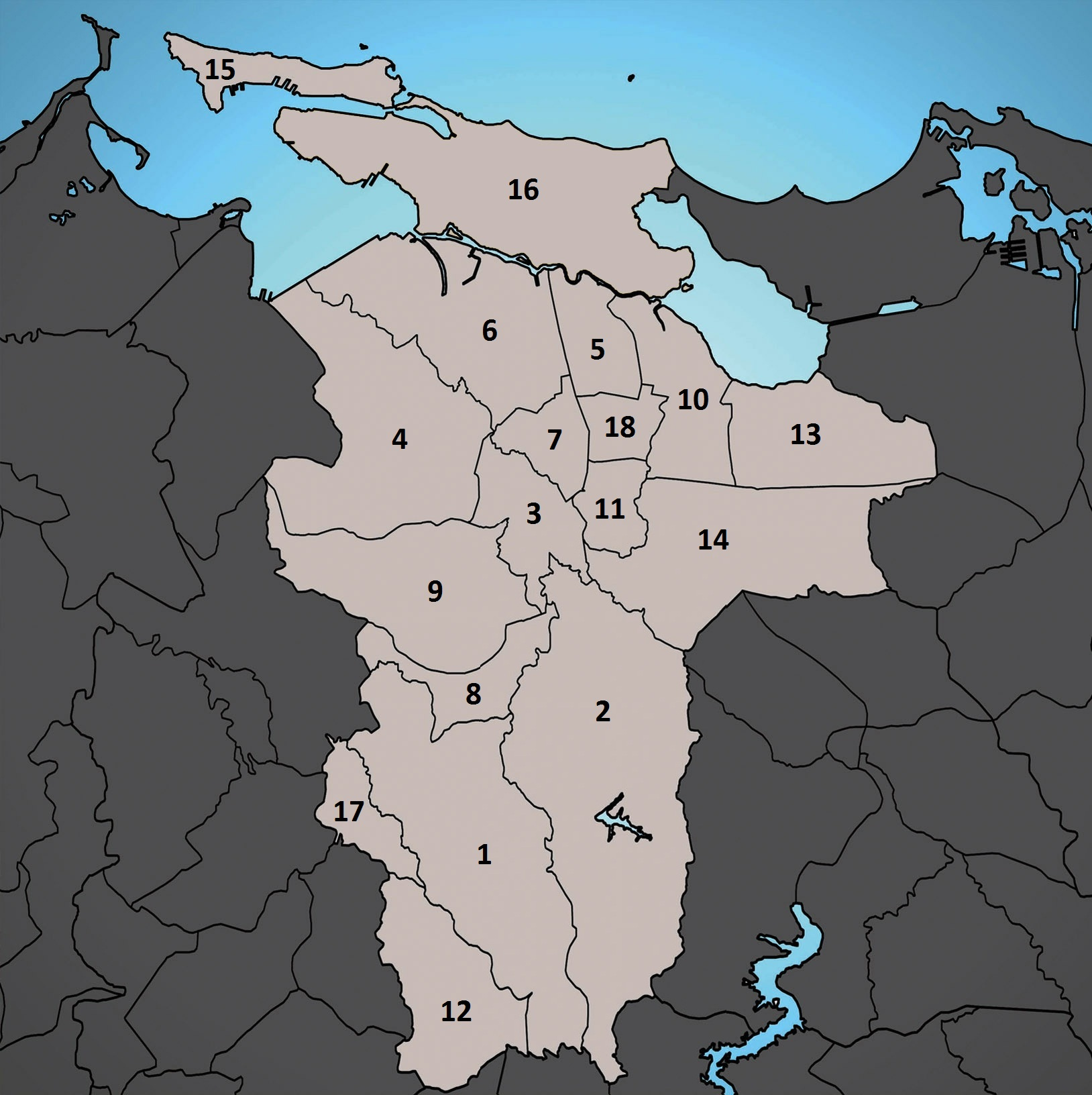
Map of barrios in San Juan (alphabetically ordered):
1. Caimito
2. Cupey
3. El Cinco
4. Gobernador Piñero
5. Hato Rey Central
6. Hato Rey Norte
7. Hato Rey Sur
8. Monacillo
9. Monacillo Urbano
10. Oriente
11. Pueblo
12. Quebrada Arenas
13. Sabana Llana Norte
14. Sabana Llana Sur
15. San Juan Antiguo
16. Santurce
17. Tortugo
18. Universidad

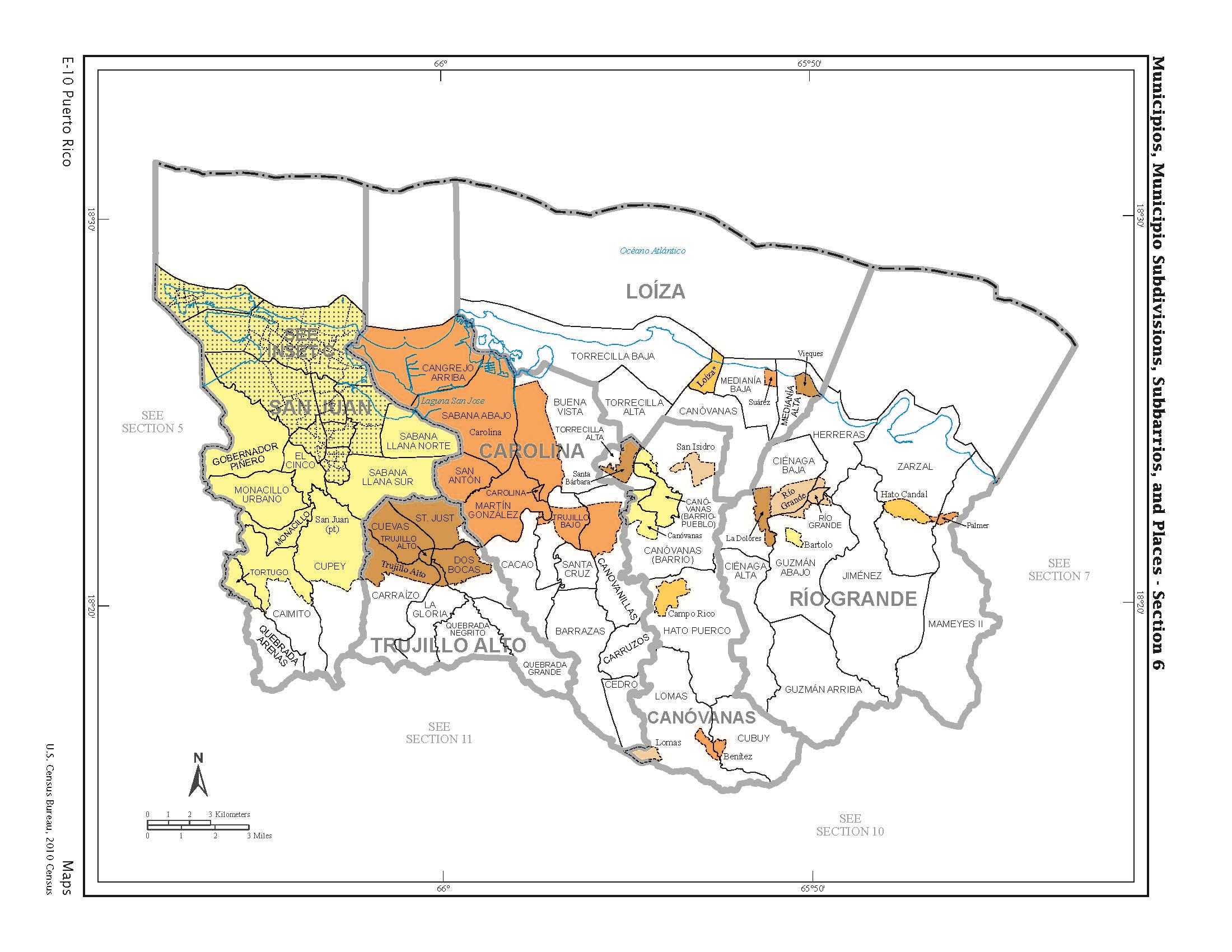
U.S. Census map of barrios in San Juan (far left in yellow) and adjacent eastern municipalities with southern barrios of San Juan demarcated and labeled, 2010

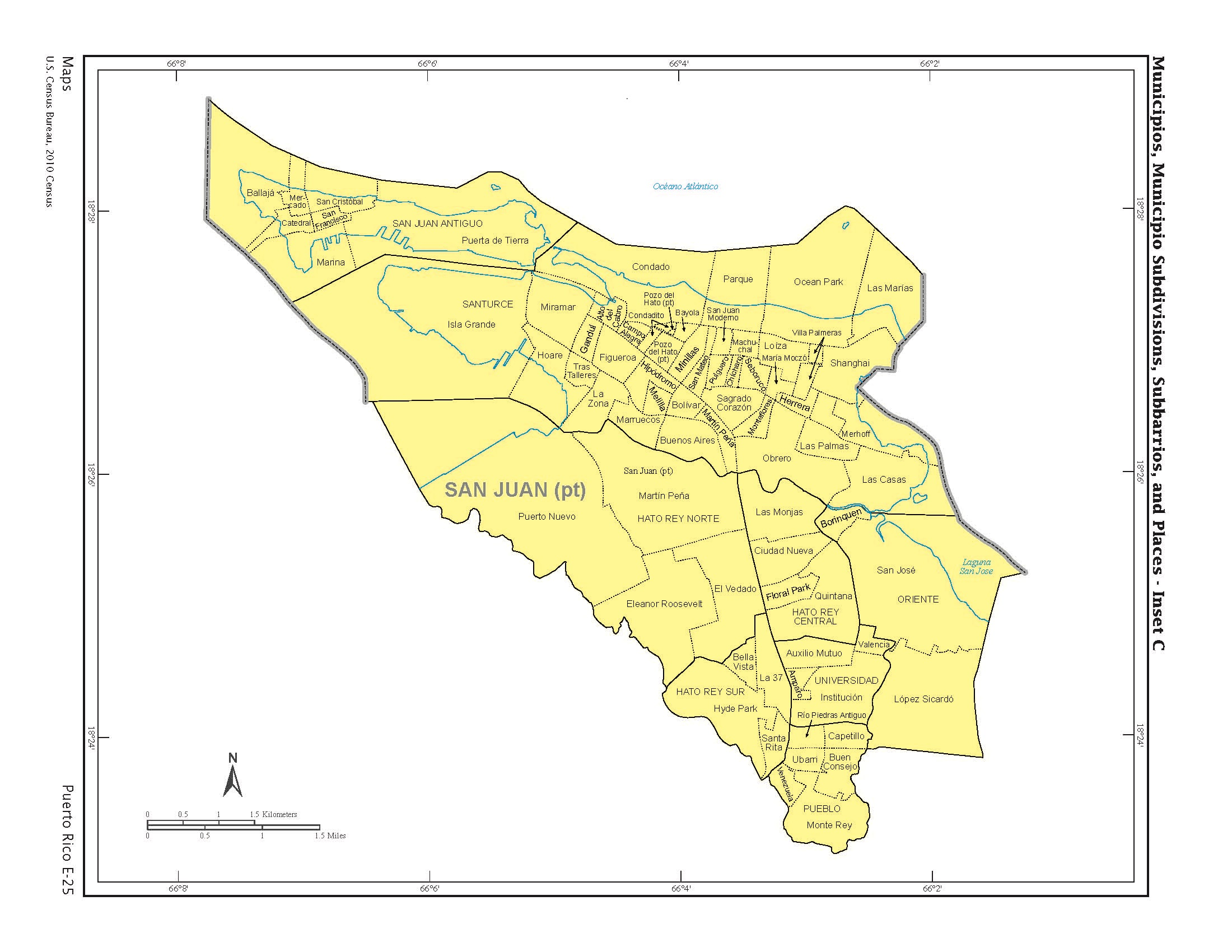
U.S. Census map of northern barrios and subbarrios or districts in San Juan, 2010

== Original barrio ==
Before its annexation of Santurce in 1862 and Río Piedras in 1951, San Juan consisted of San Juan Antiguo.

=== San Juan Antiguo ===
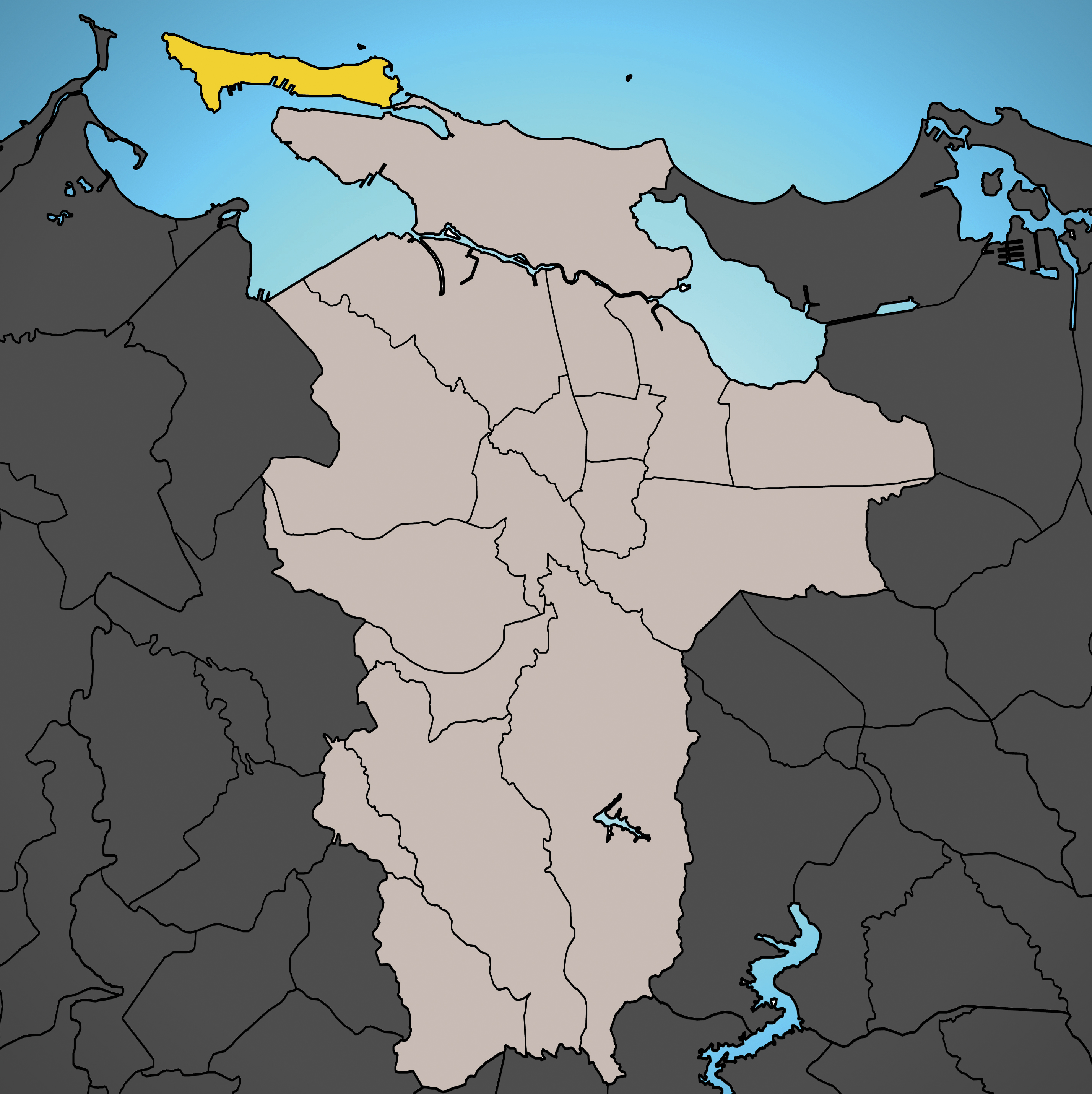
San Juan Antiguo within San Juan (yellow)

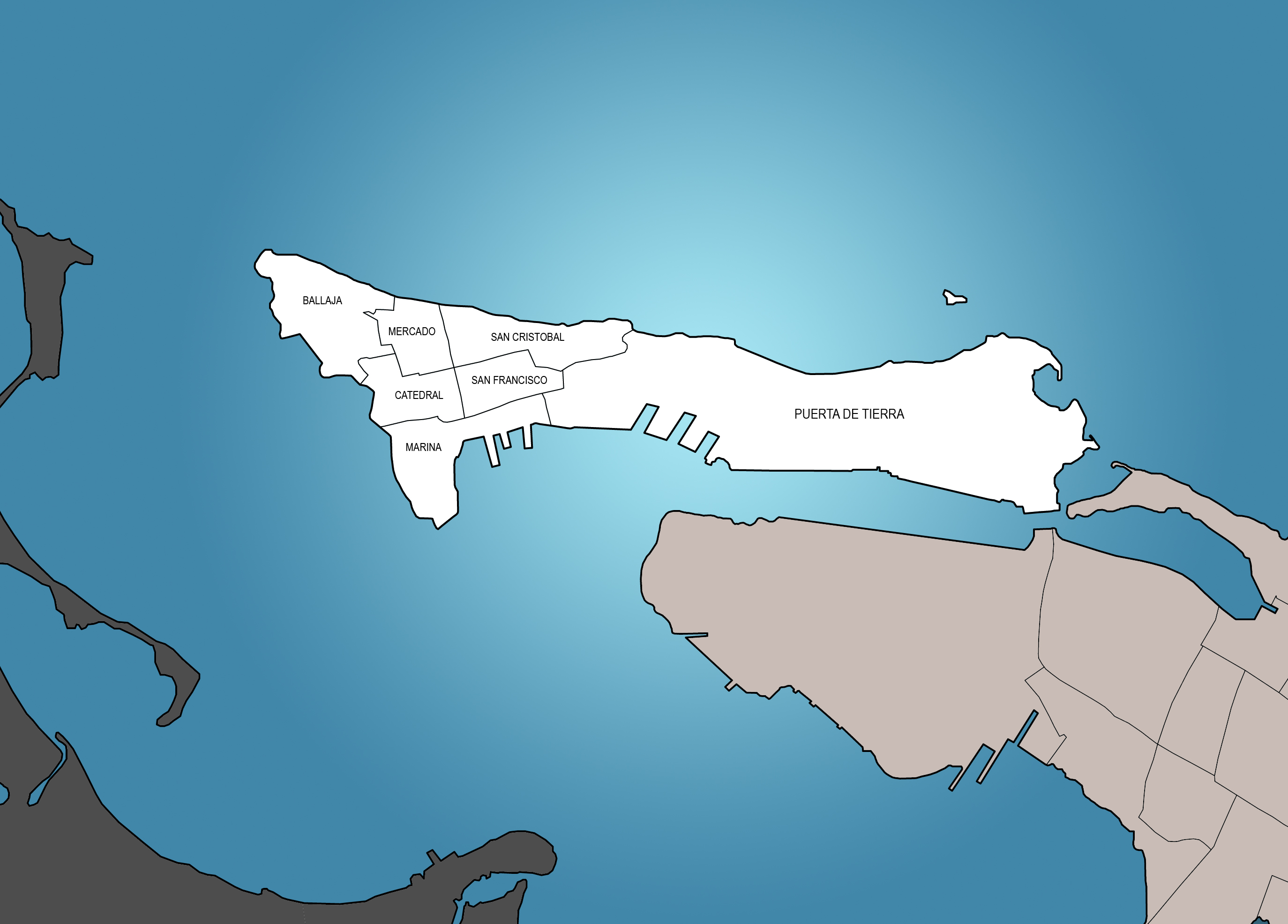
Subbarrios within San Juan Antiguo

San Juan Antiguo is divided into seven subbarrios or districts (all comprise the Old San Juan historic quarter except for Puerta de Tierra):

- Ballajá
- Catedral
- Marina
- Mercado
- Puerta de Tierra
- San Cristóbal
- San Francisco

== Acquired barrios ==
=== Santurce ===
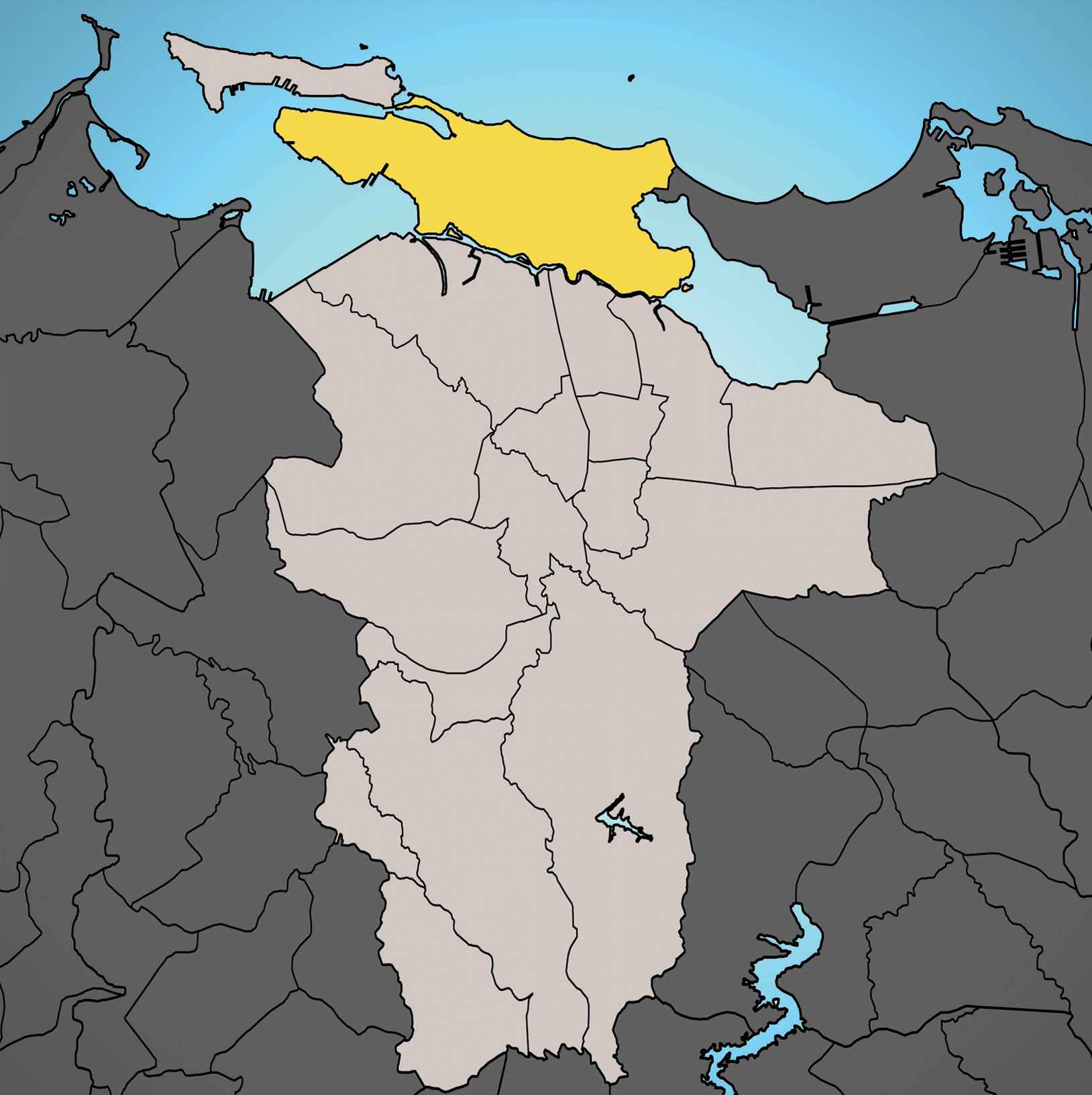
Santurce within San Juan (yellow)

In 1862, San Juan annexed Santurce, originally part of the defunct municipality of San Mateo de Cangrejos, as one barrio.

Santurce is divided into 40 subbarrios or districts (alphabetically ordered):

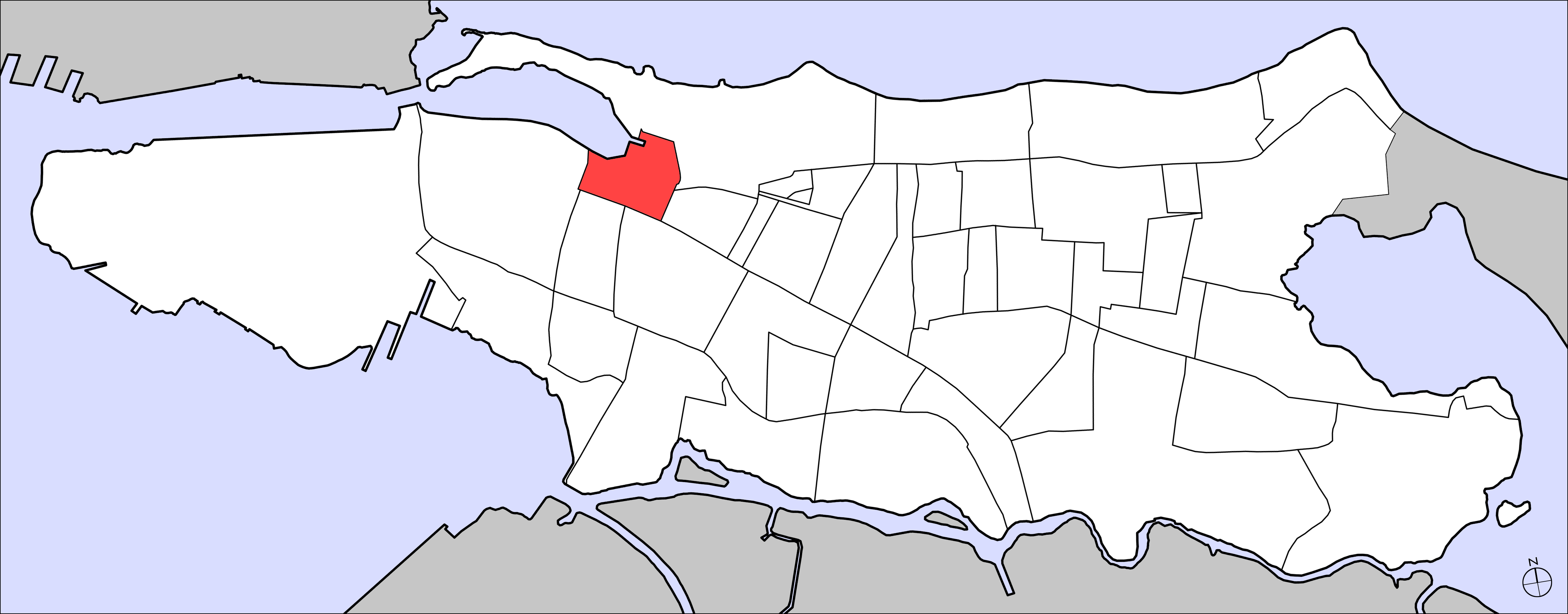
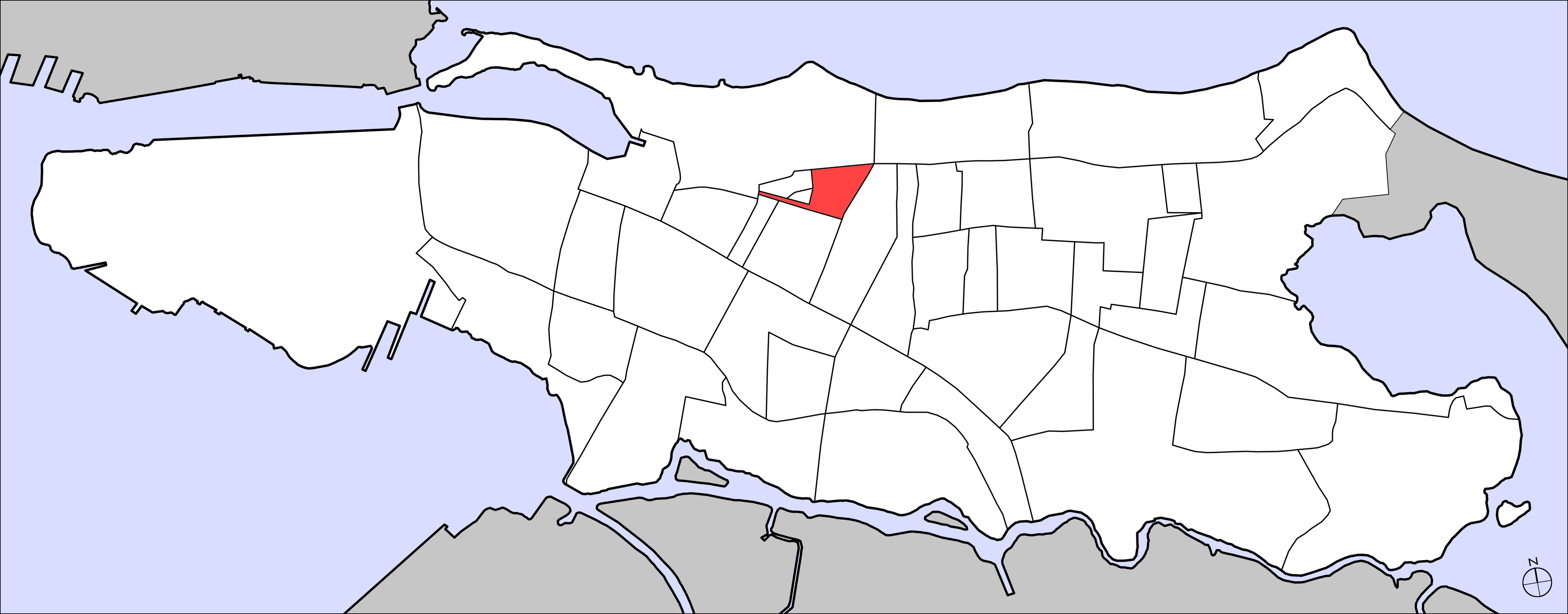
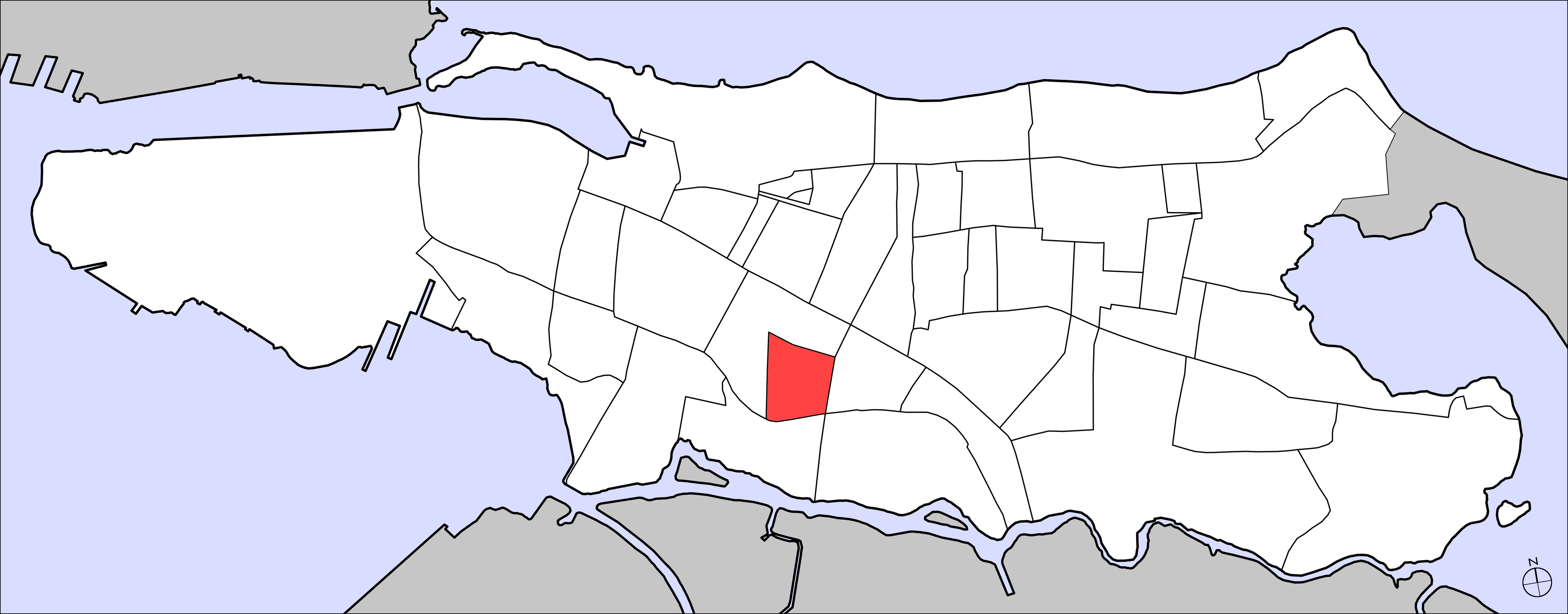
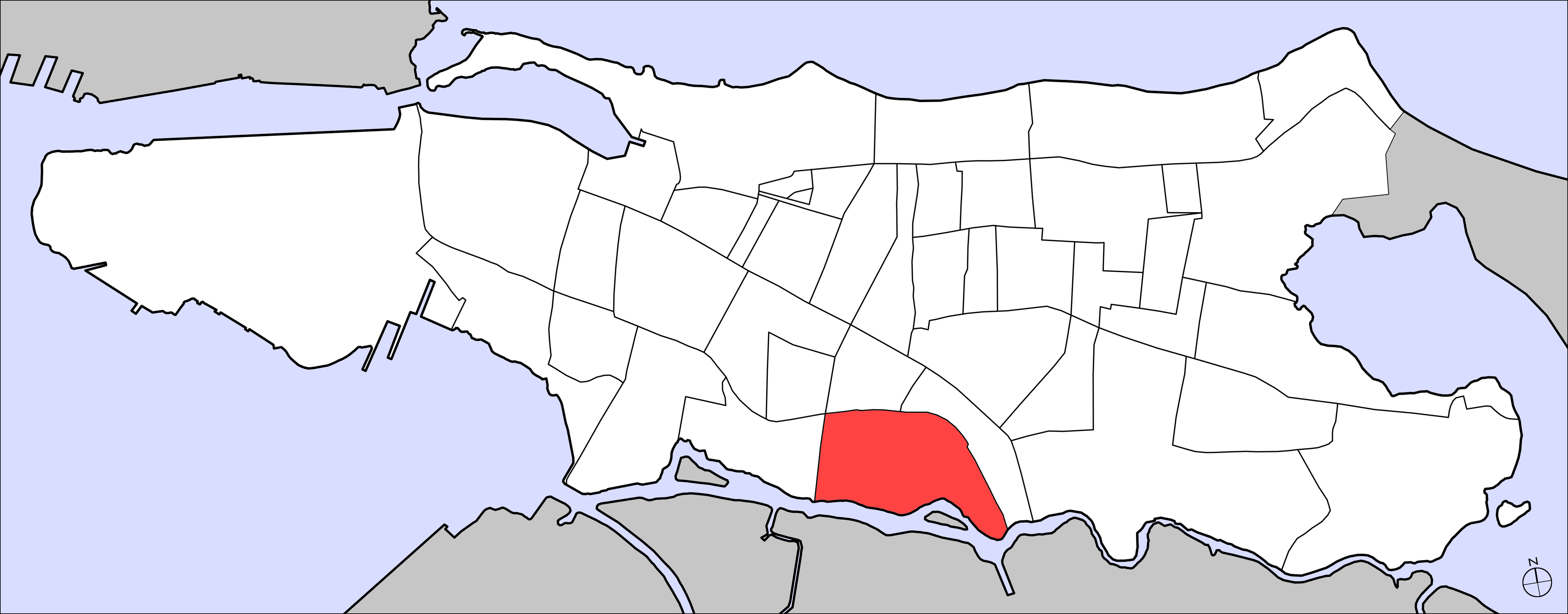
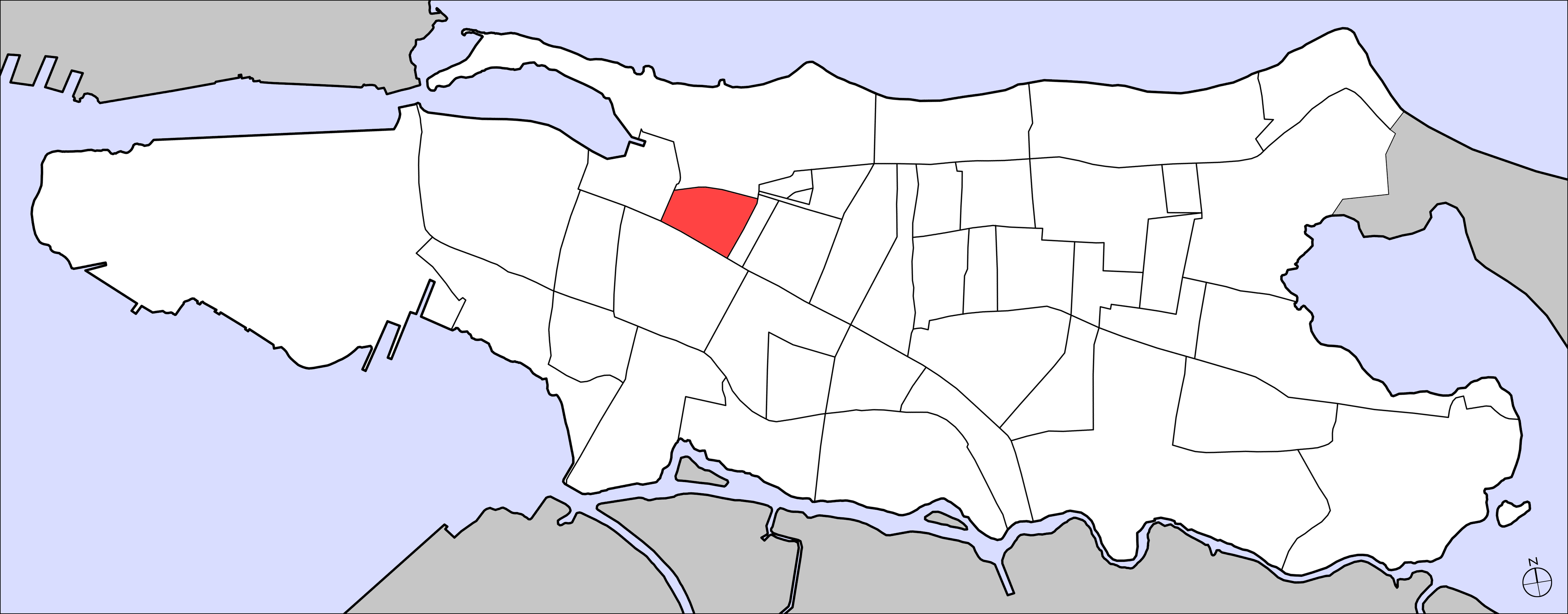
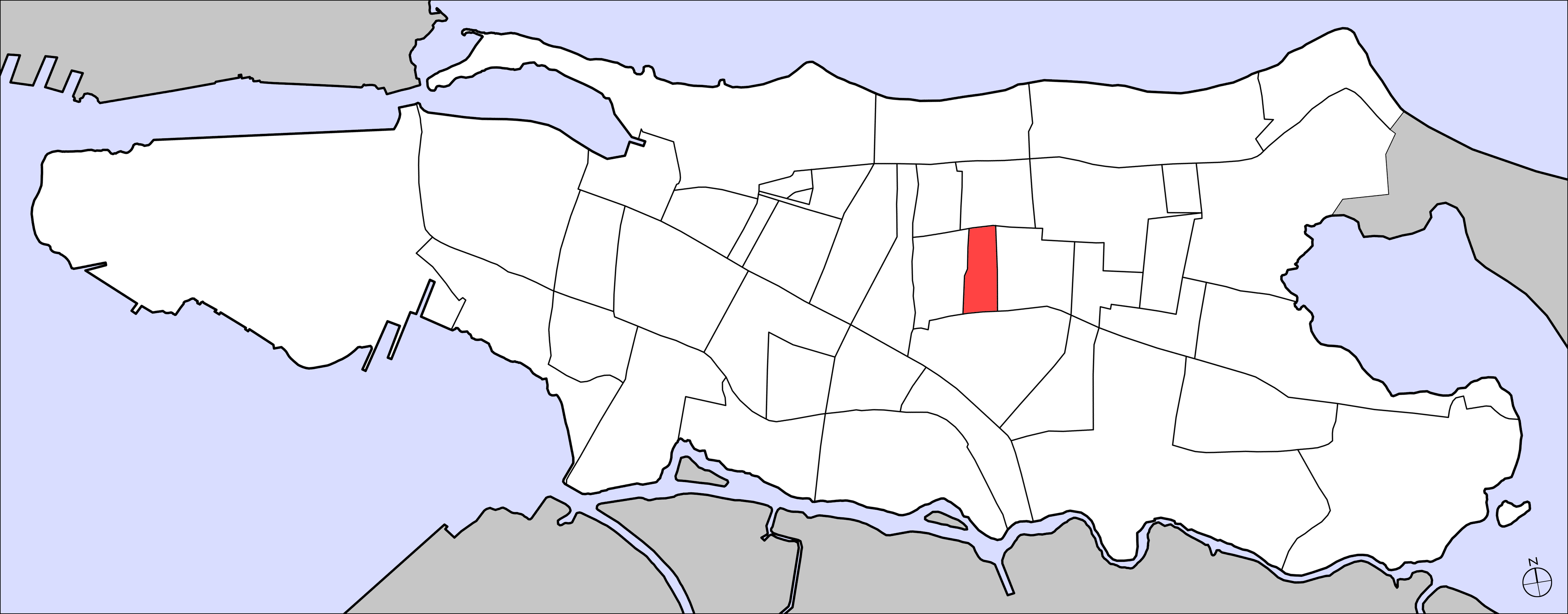
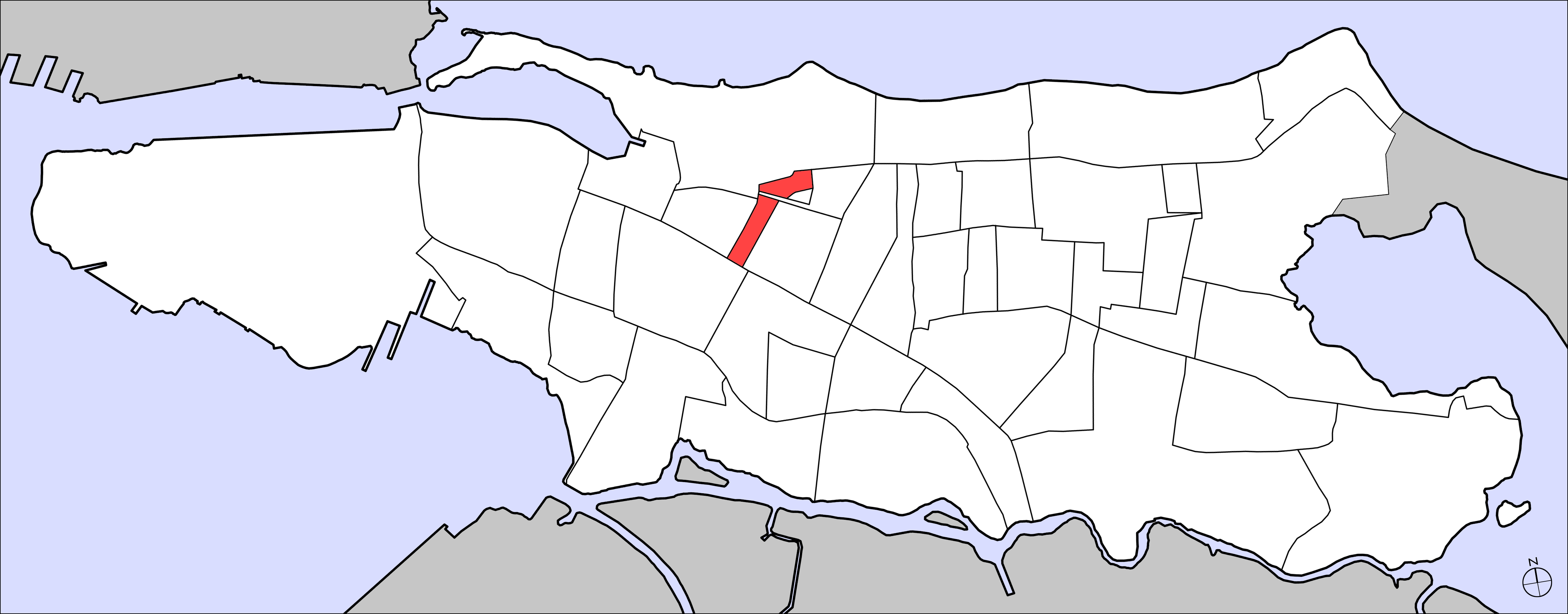
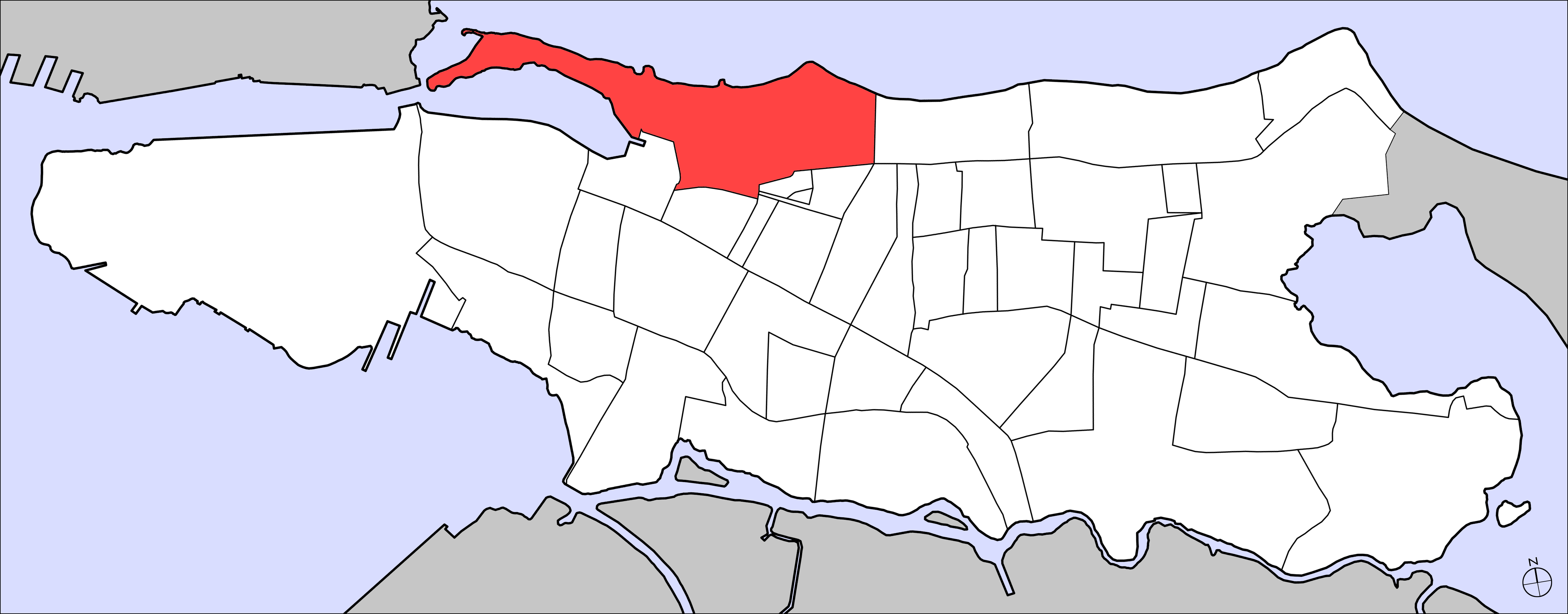
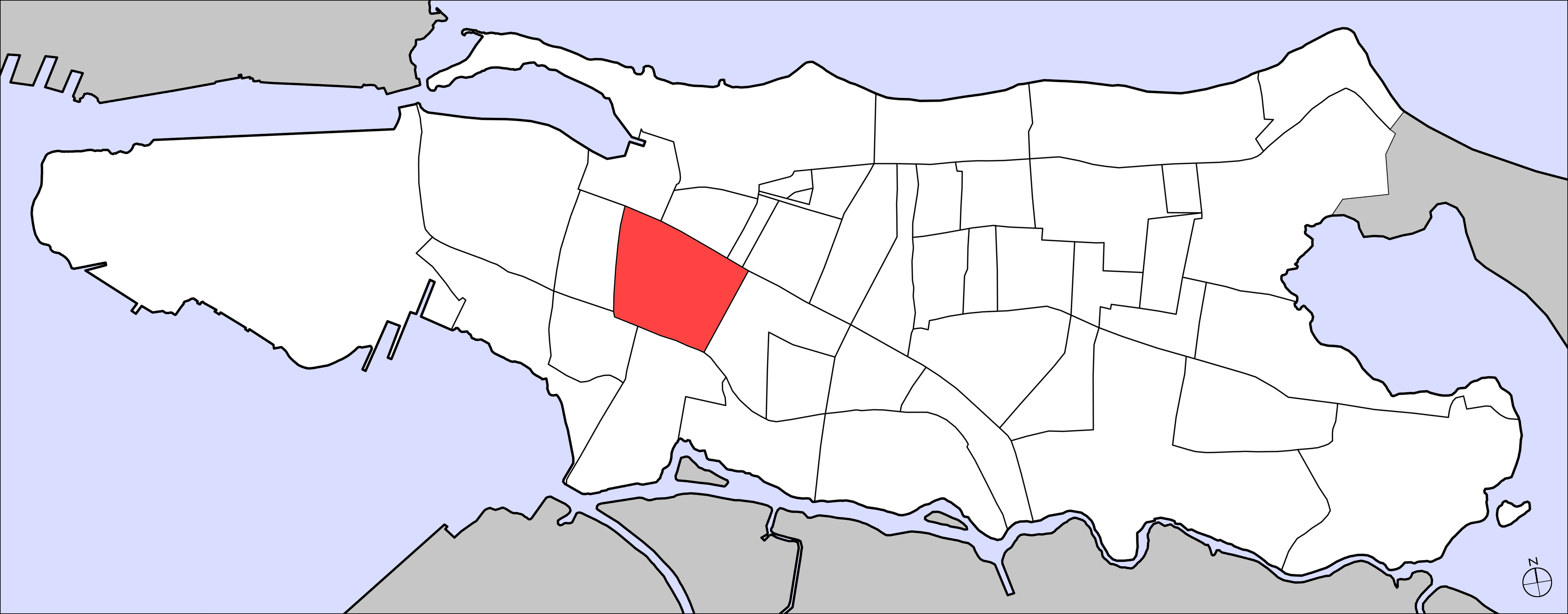
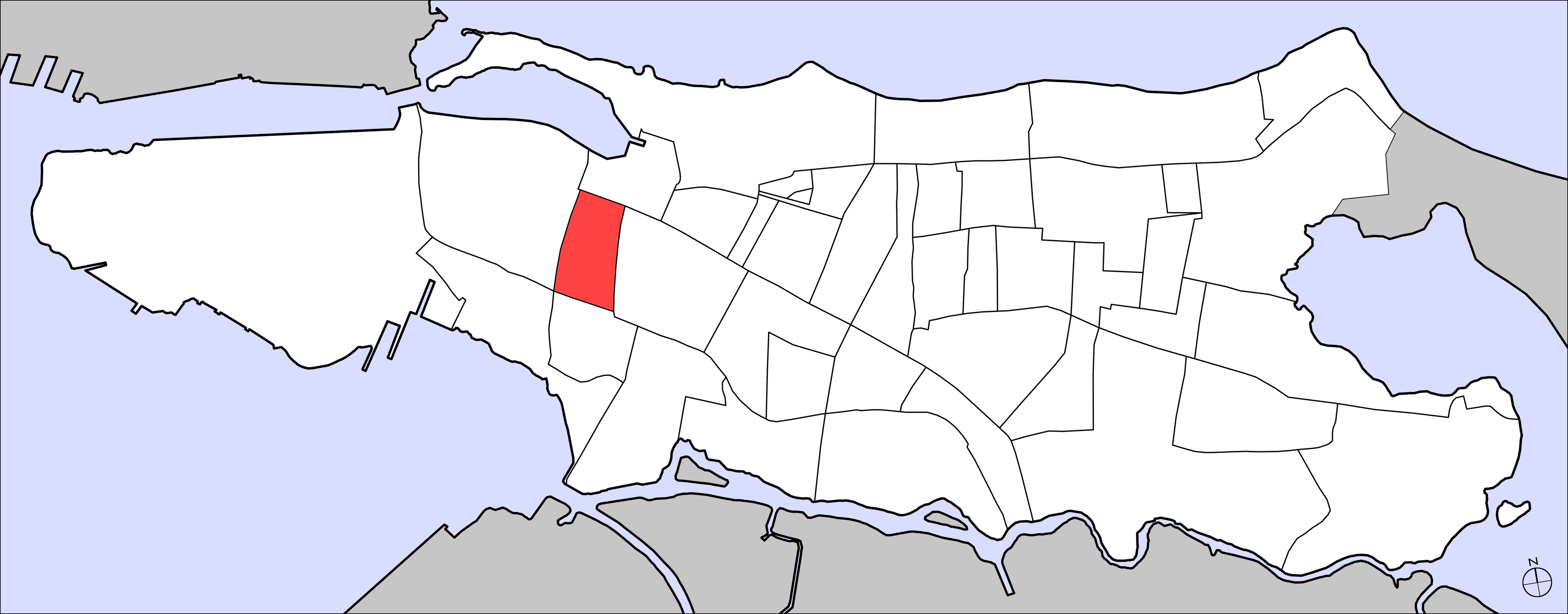
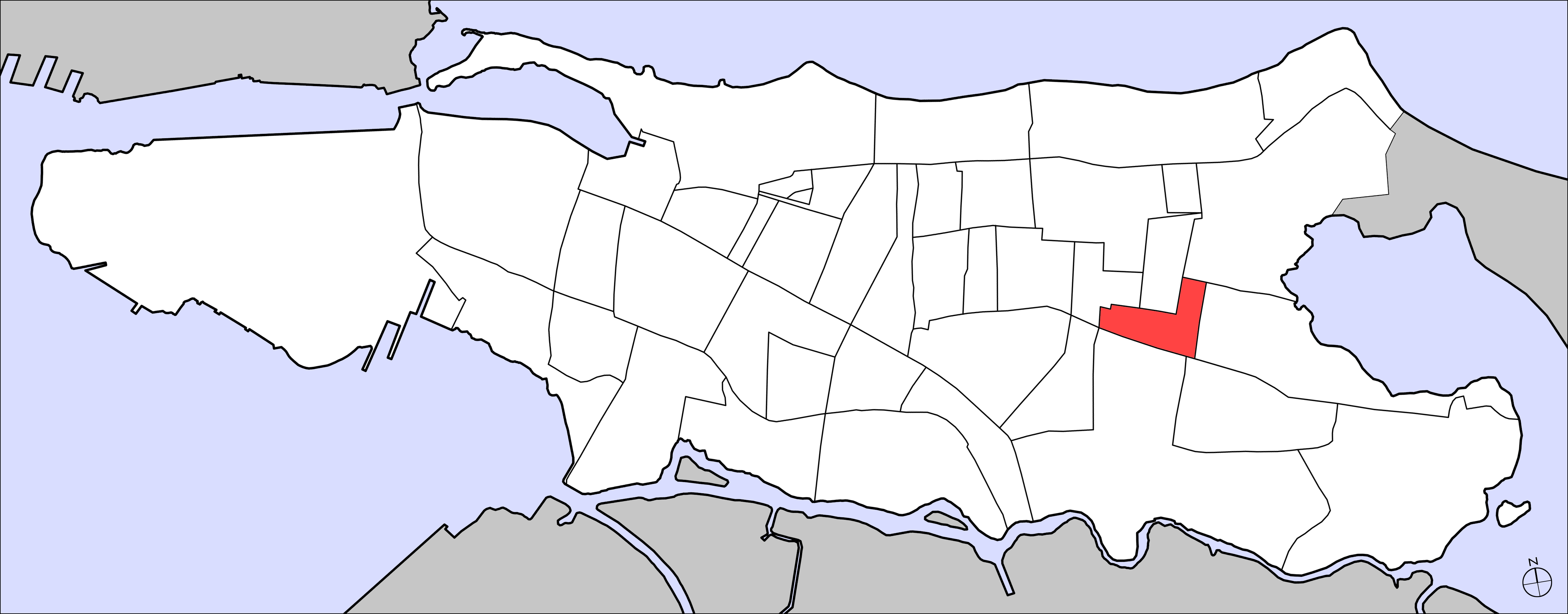
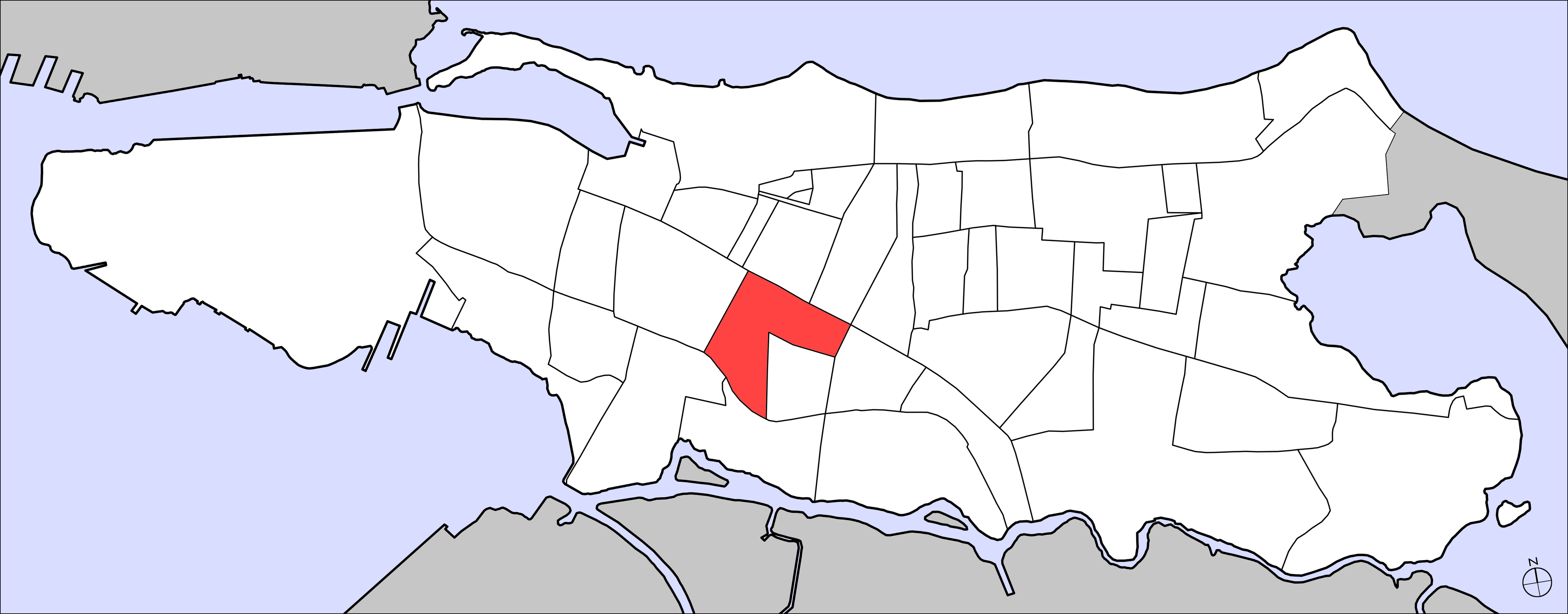
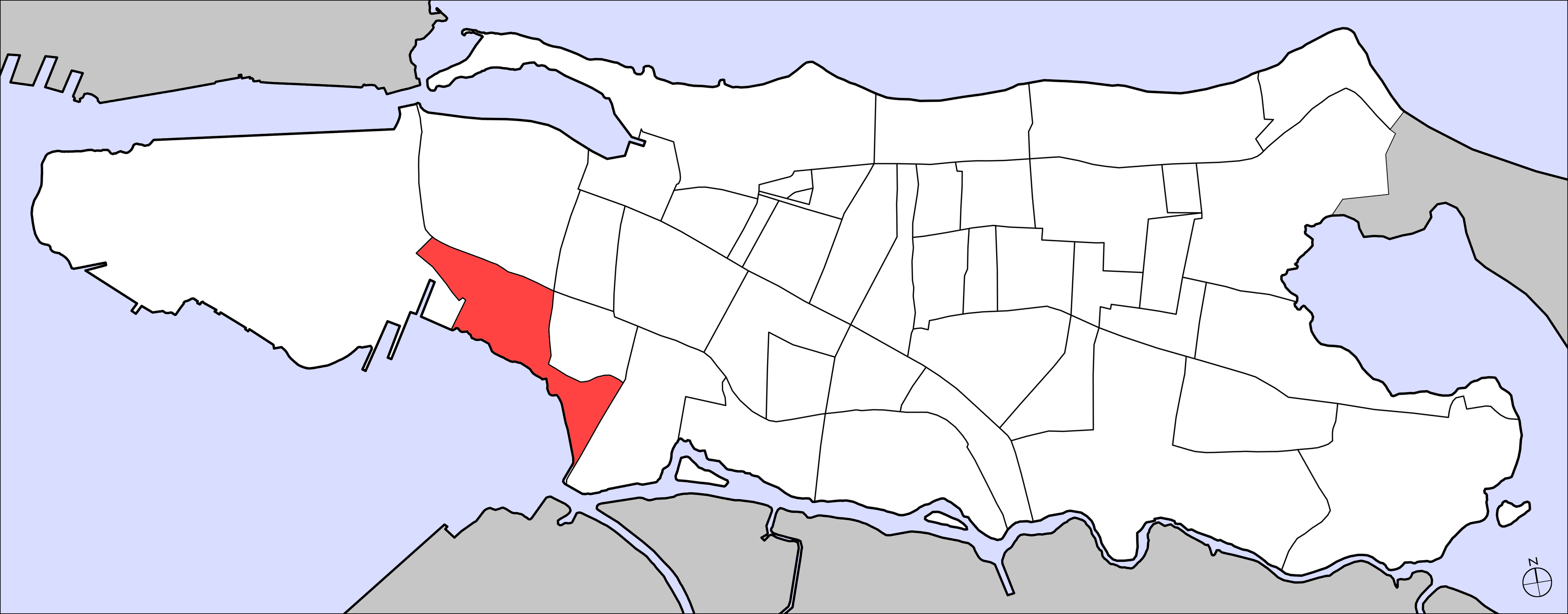
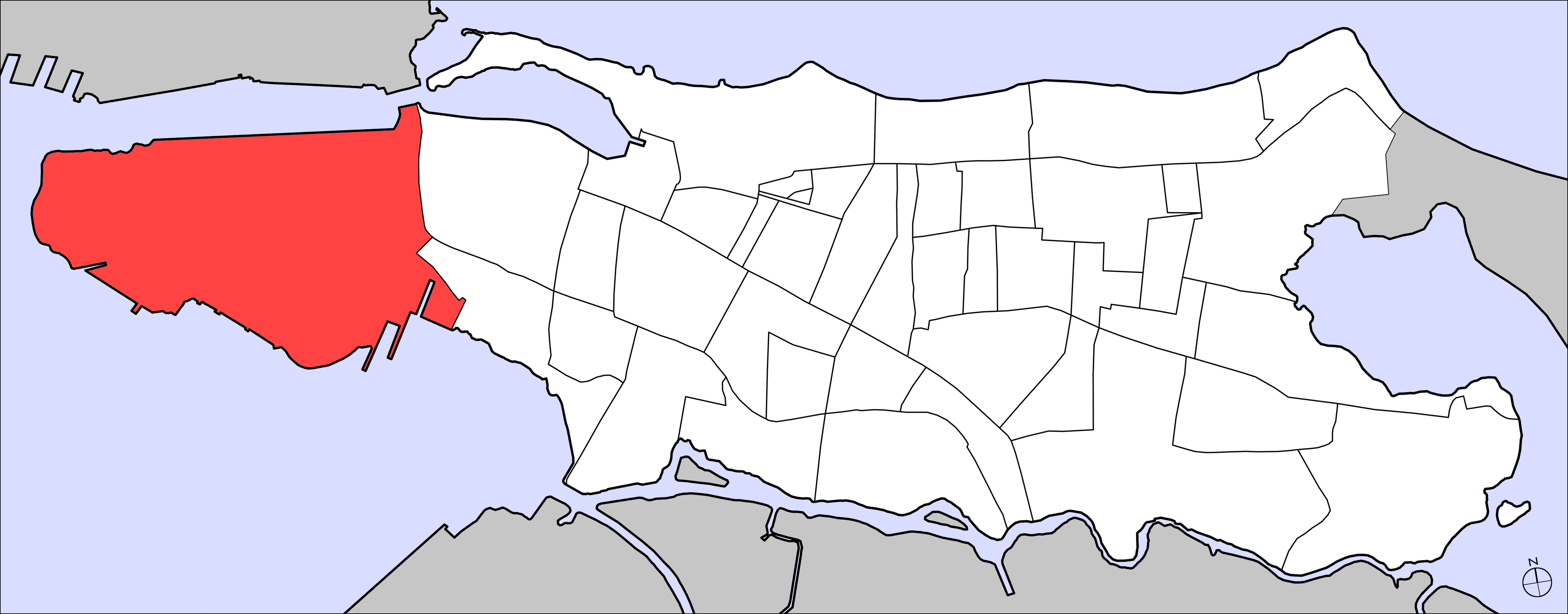
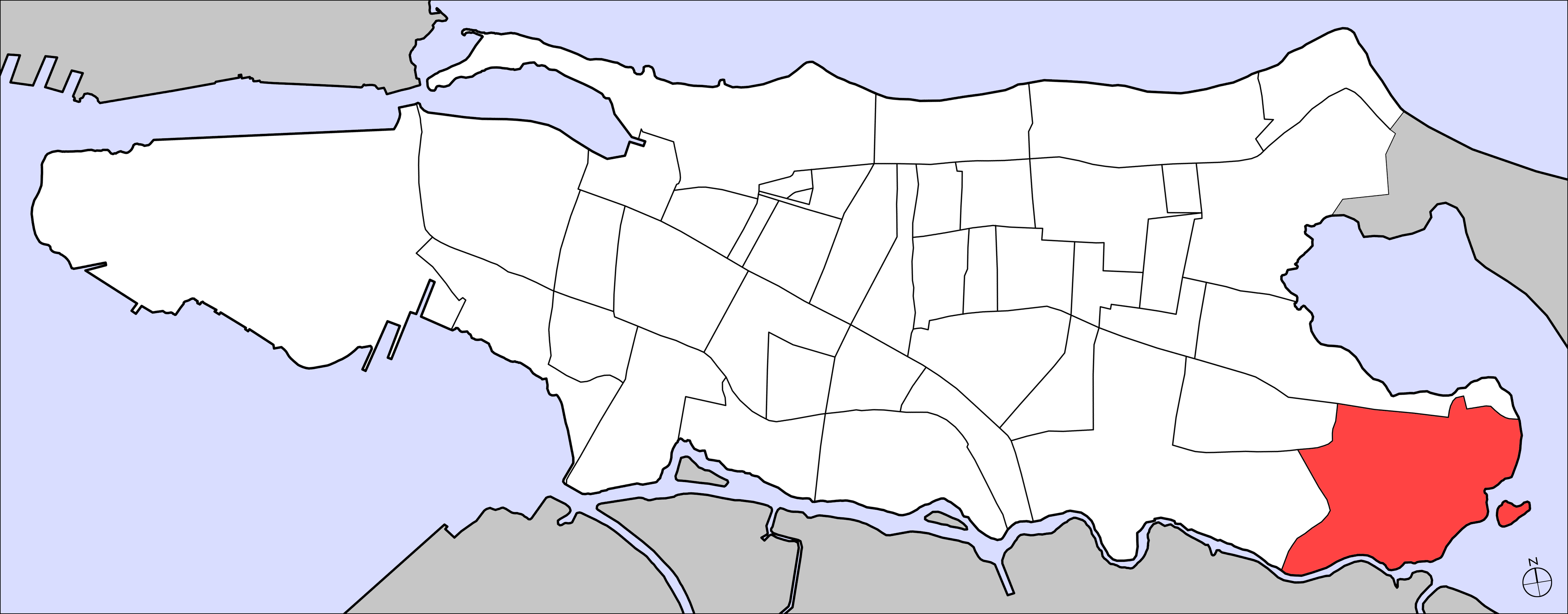
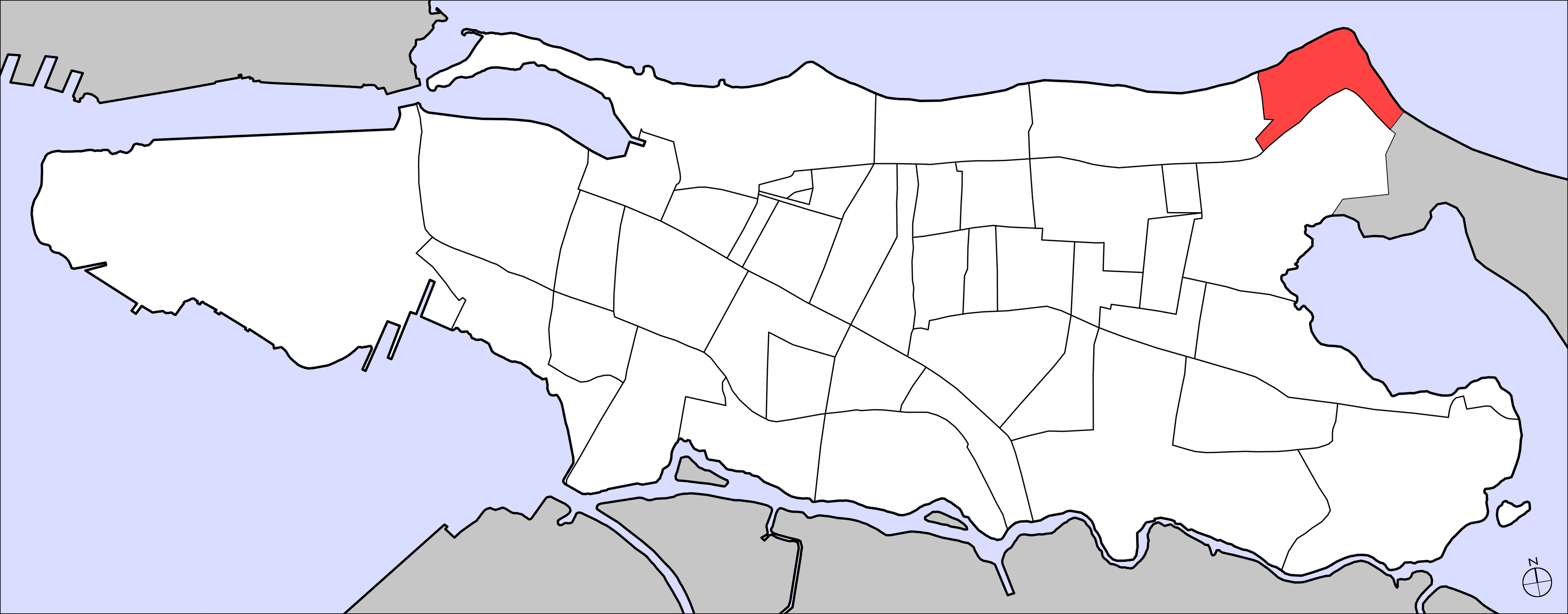
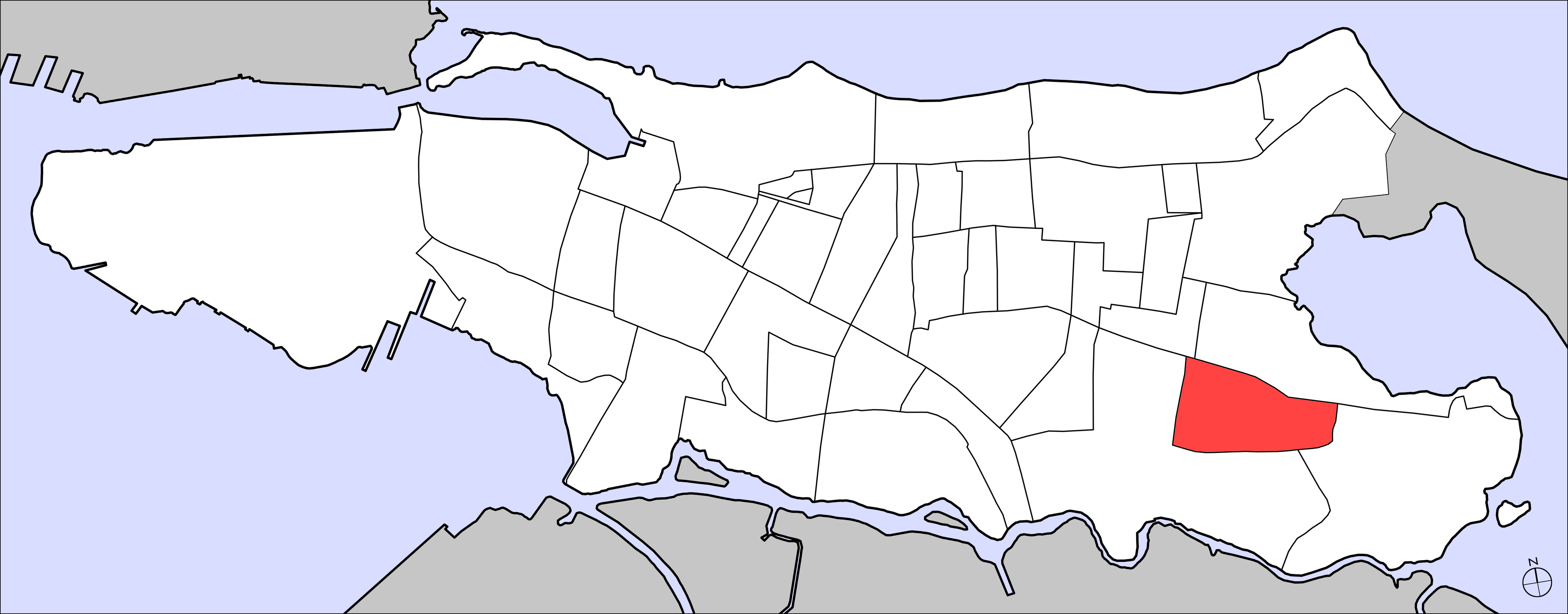
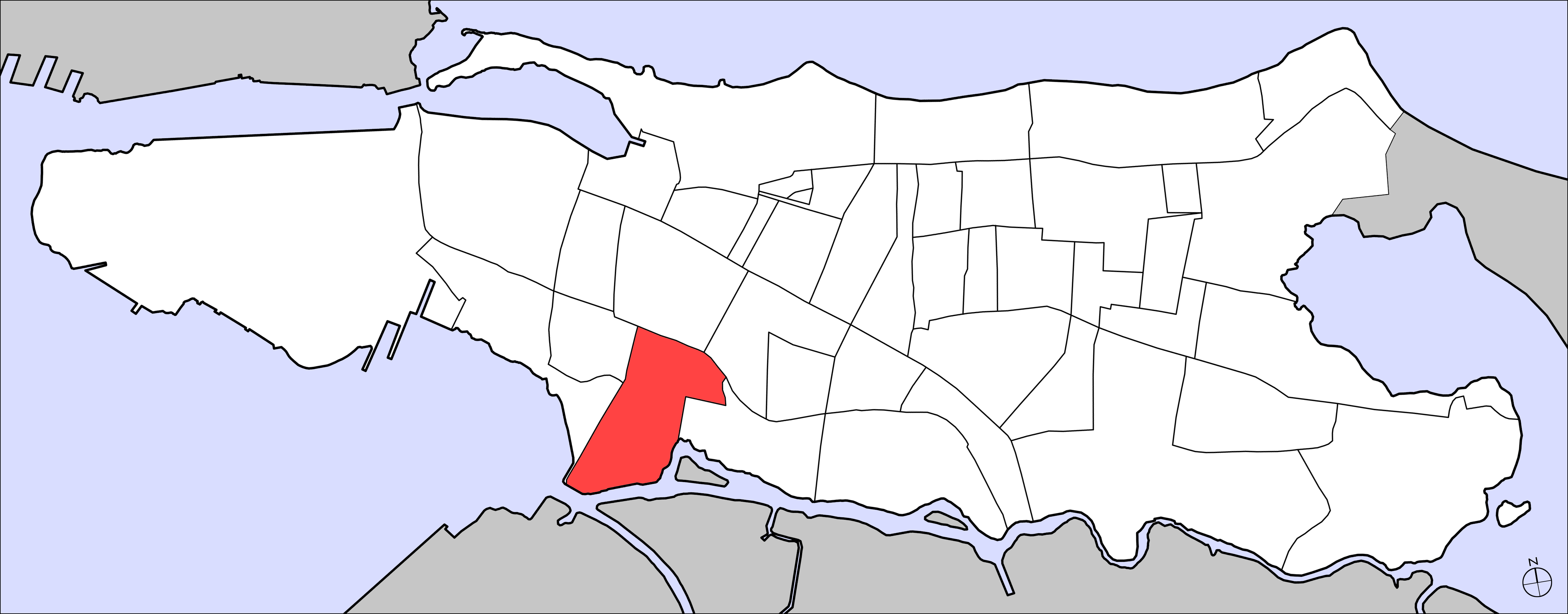
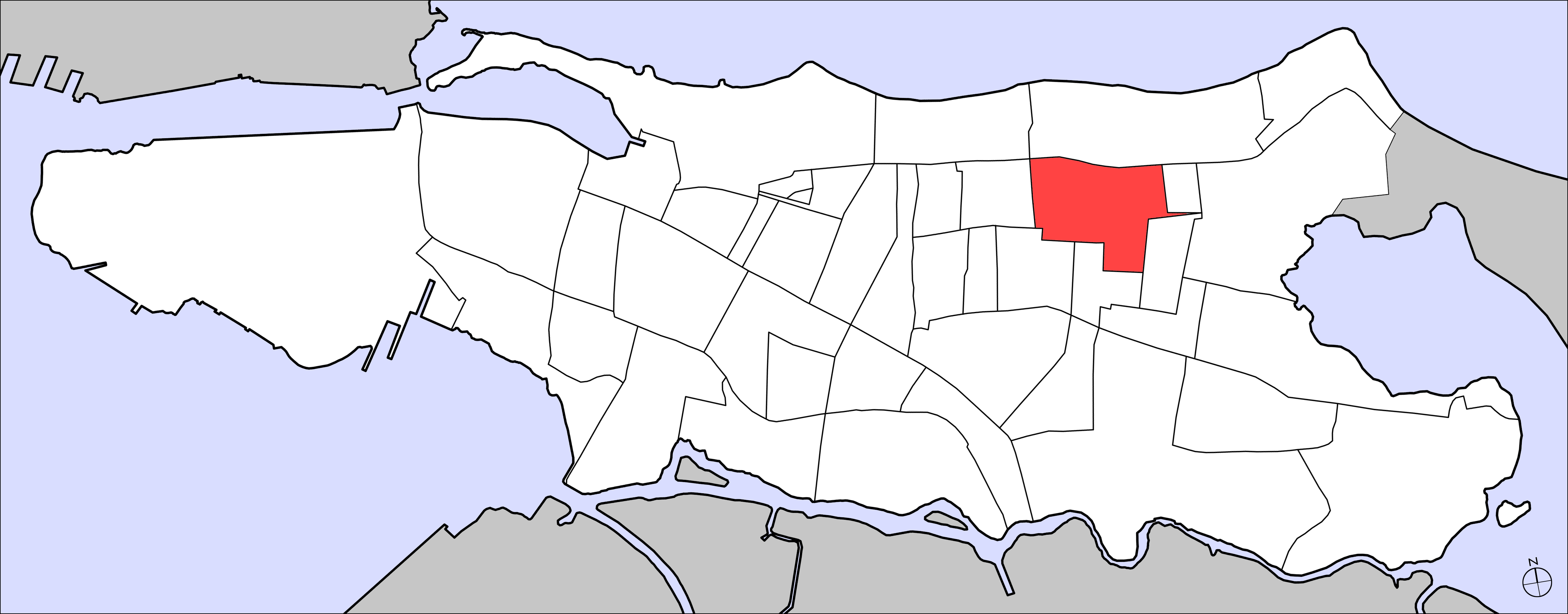
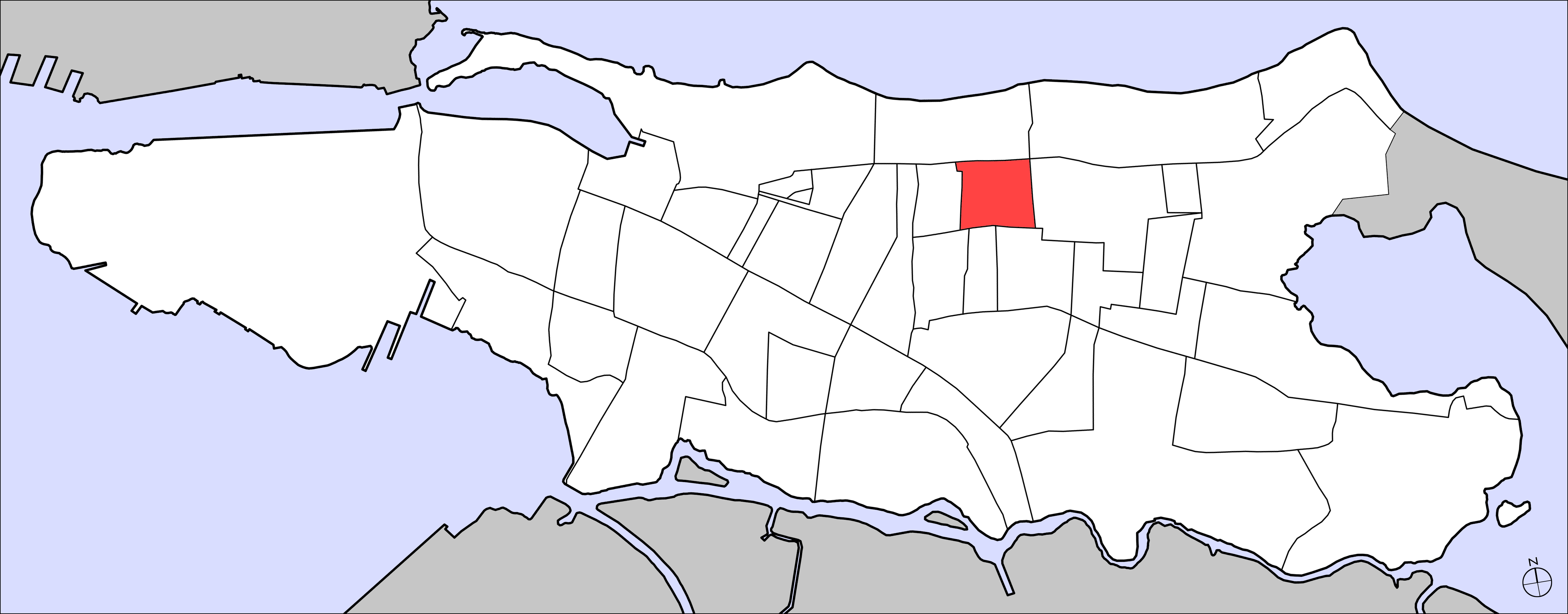
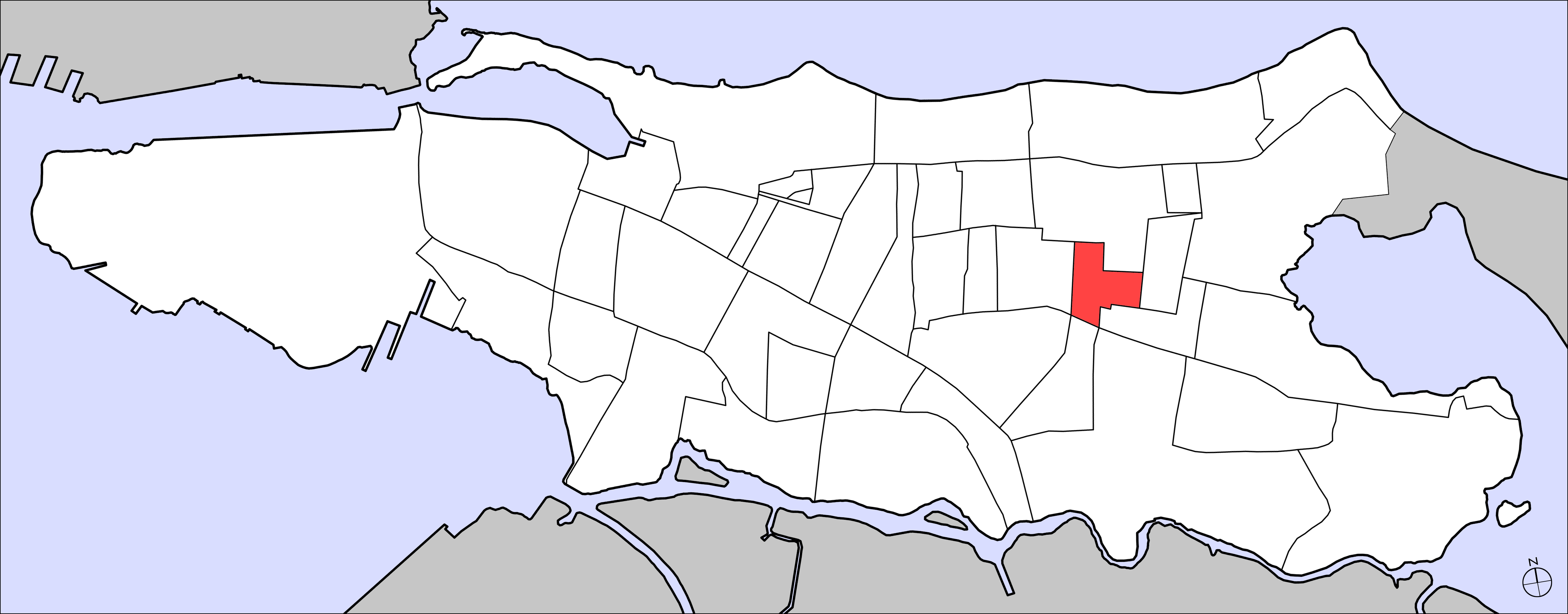
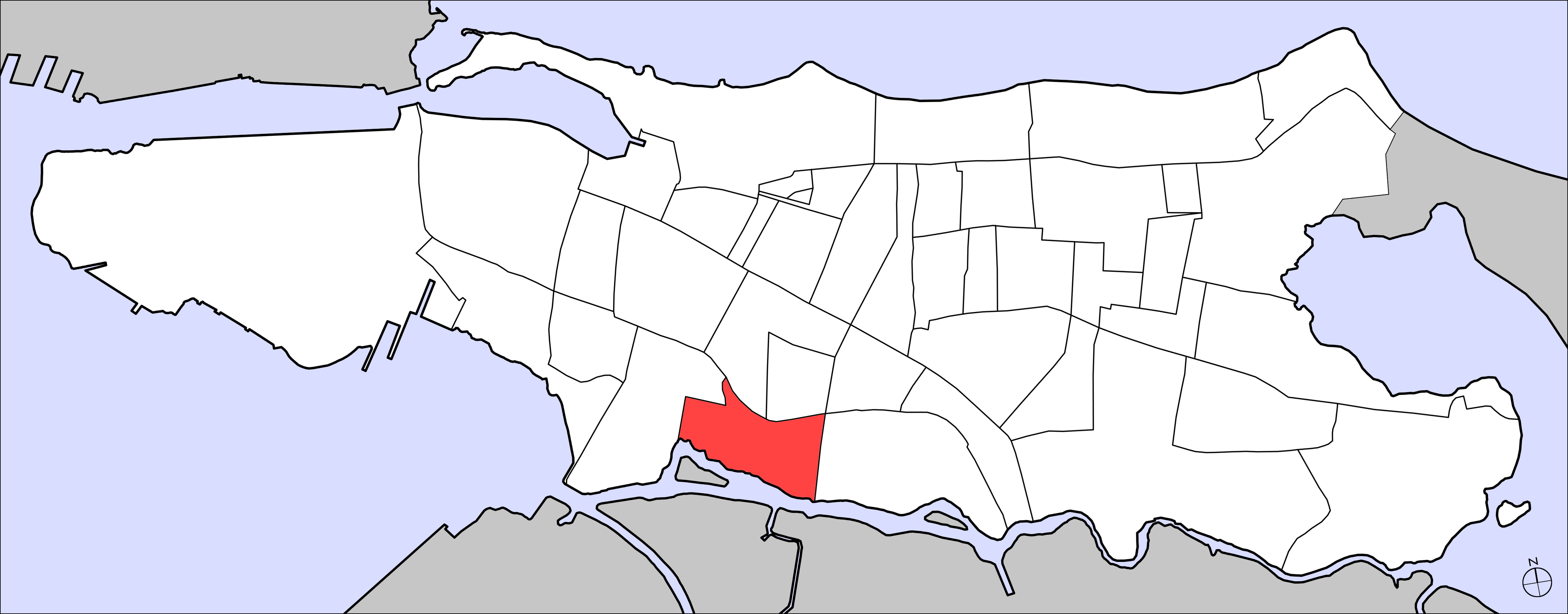
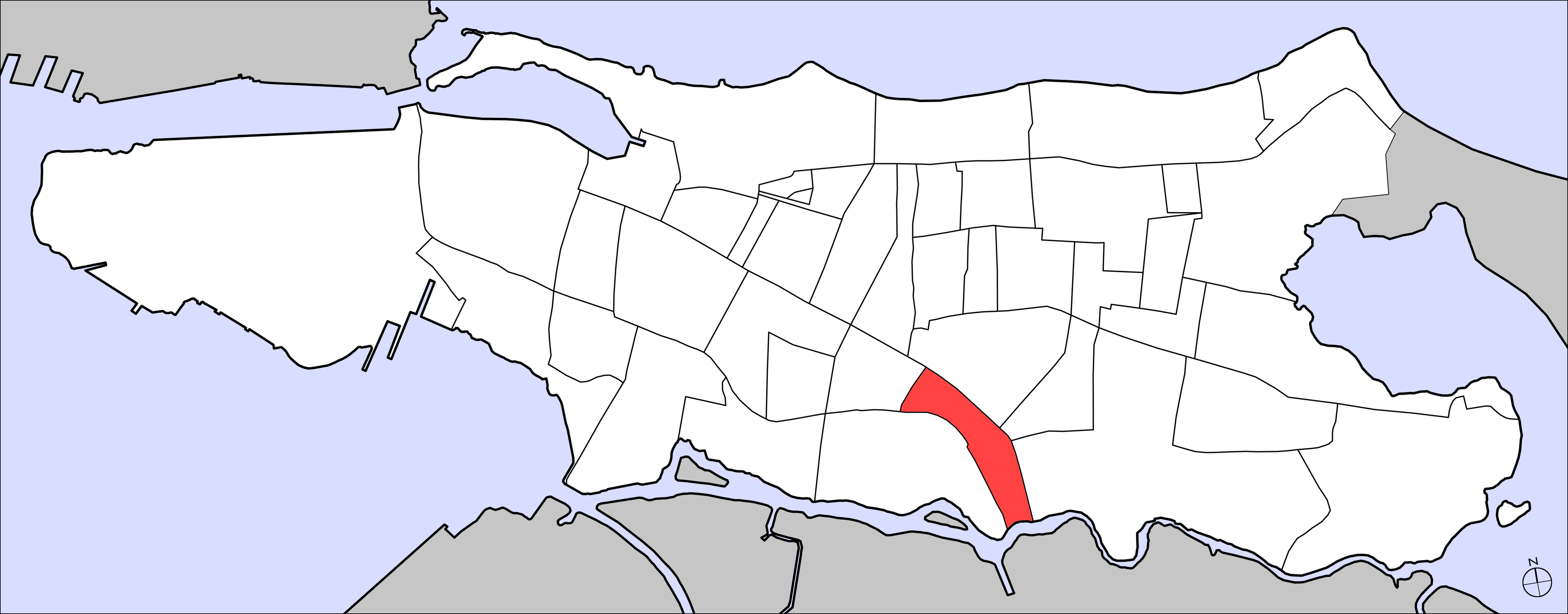
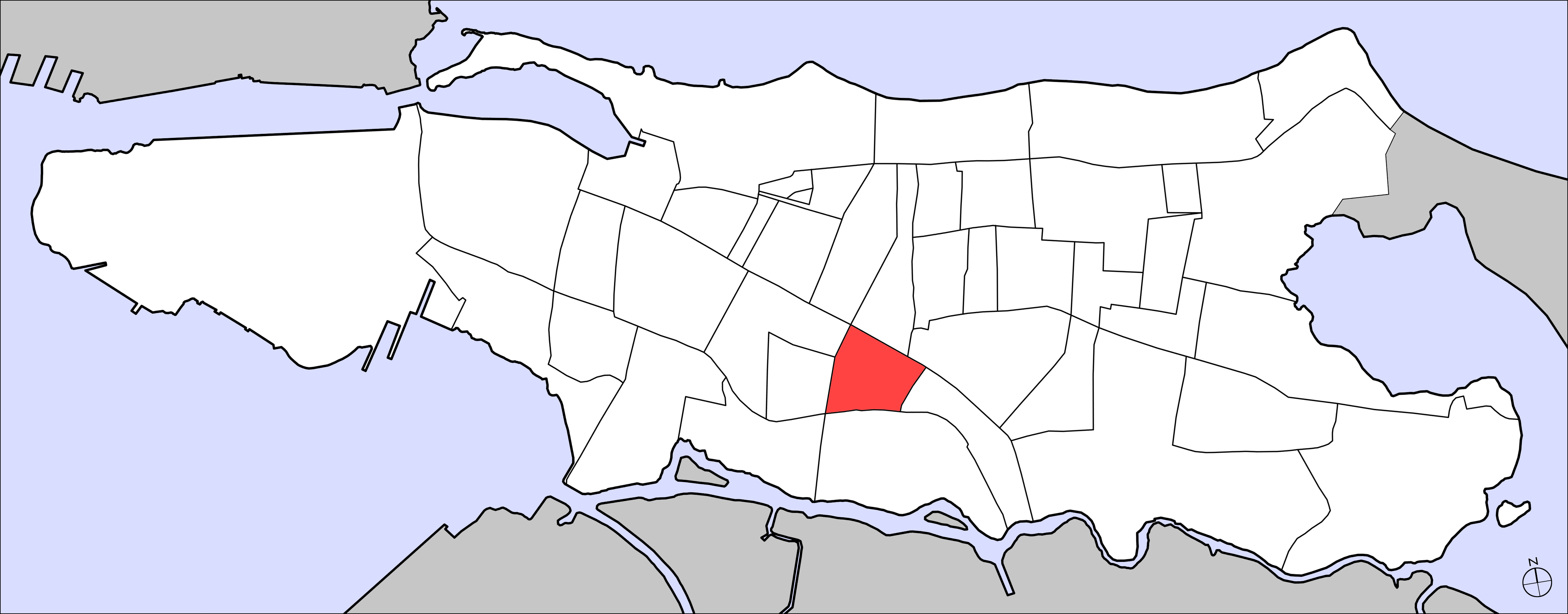
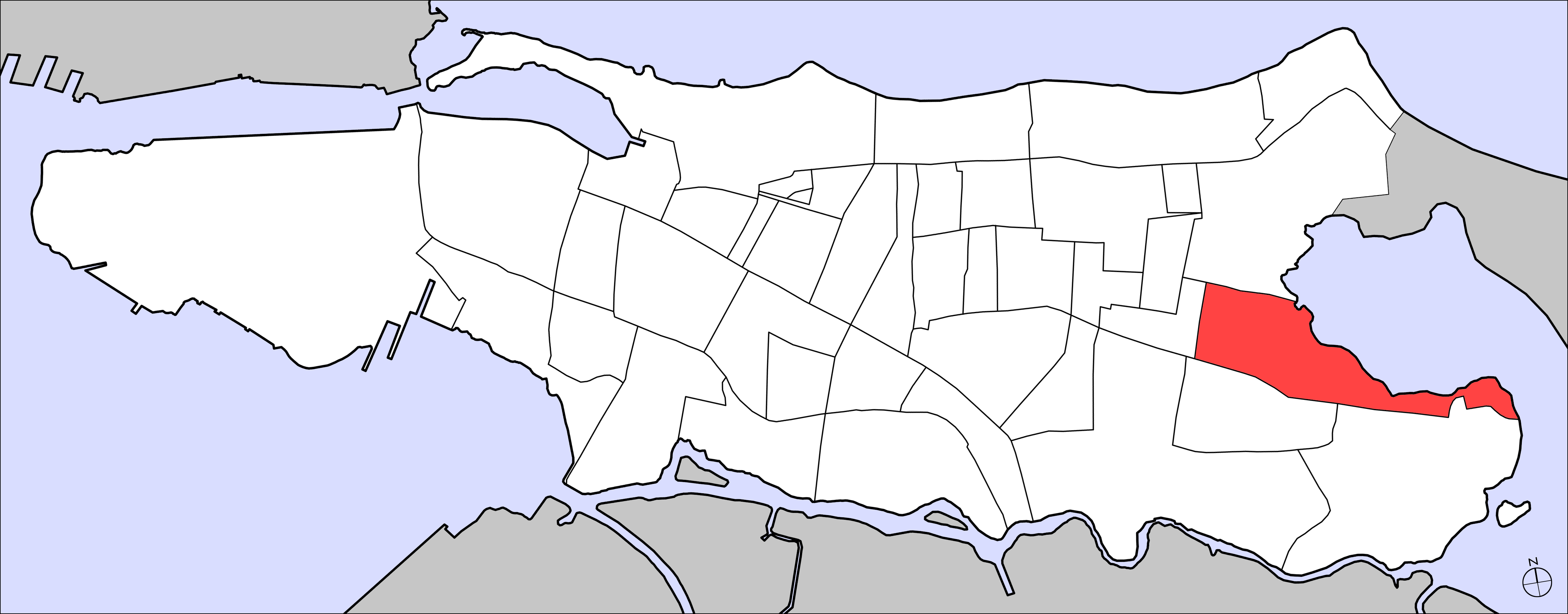
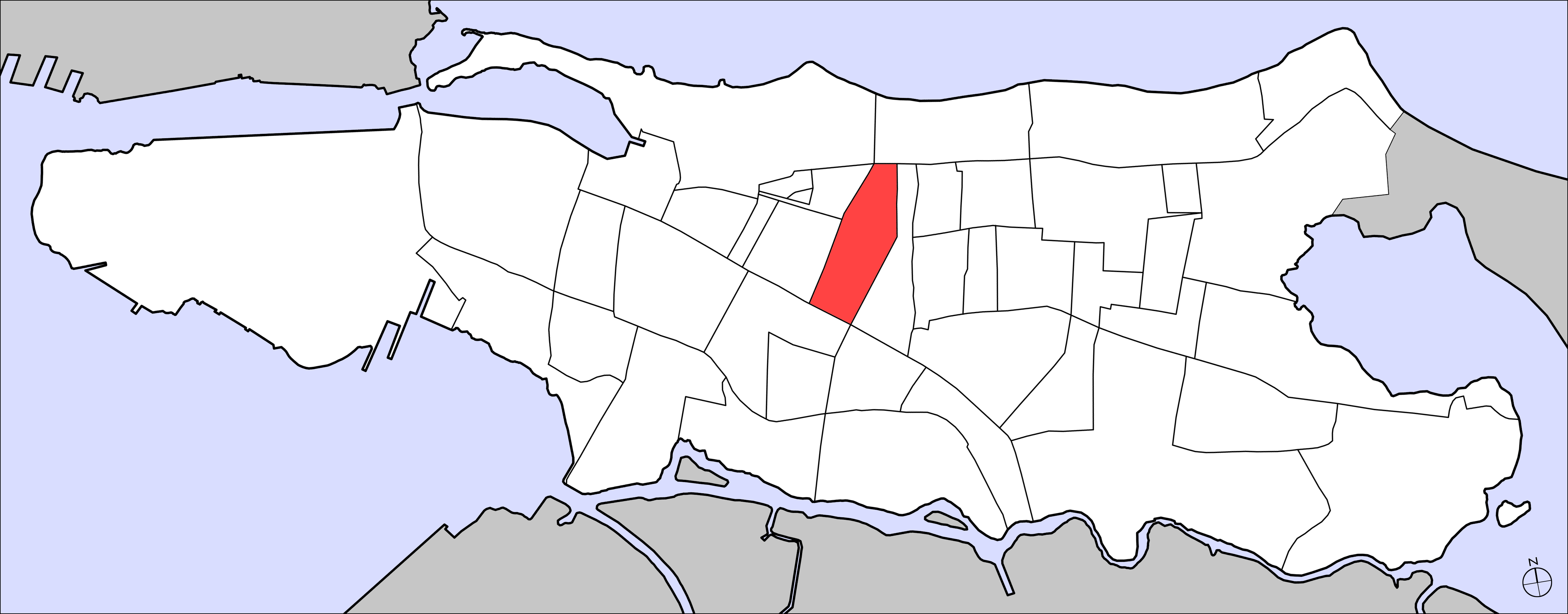
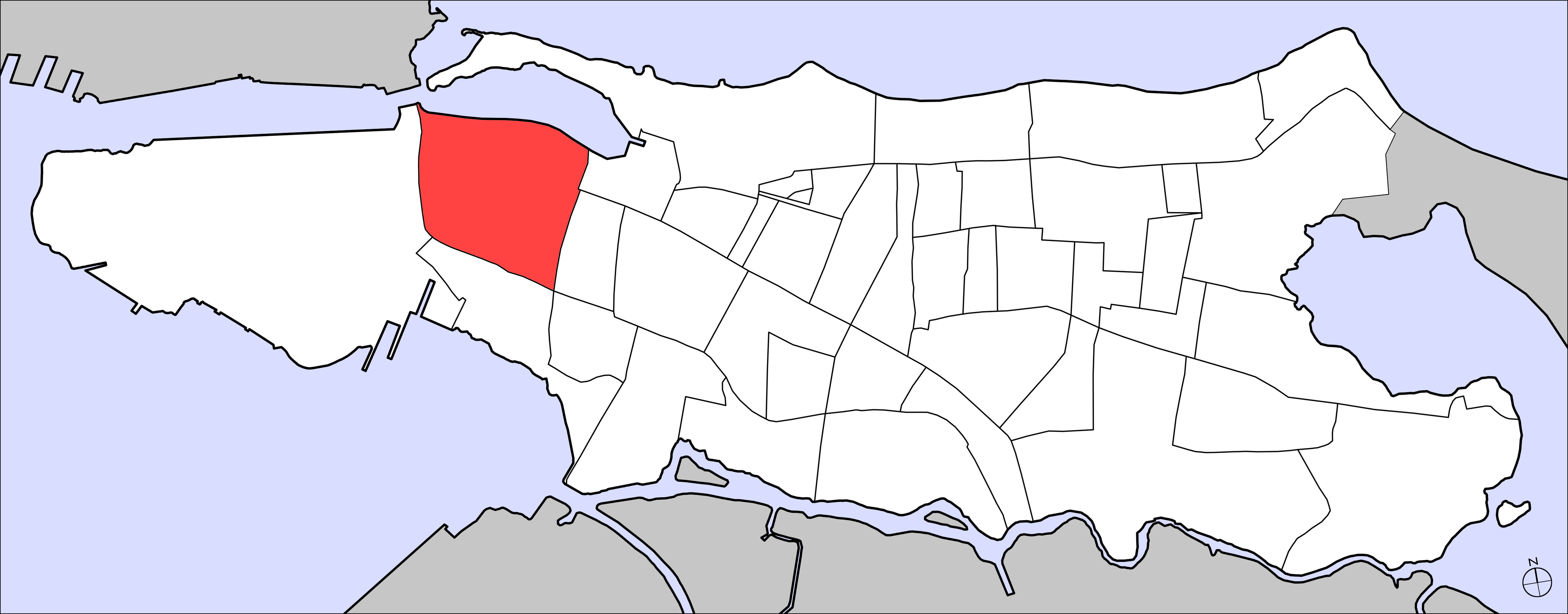
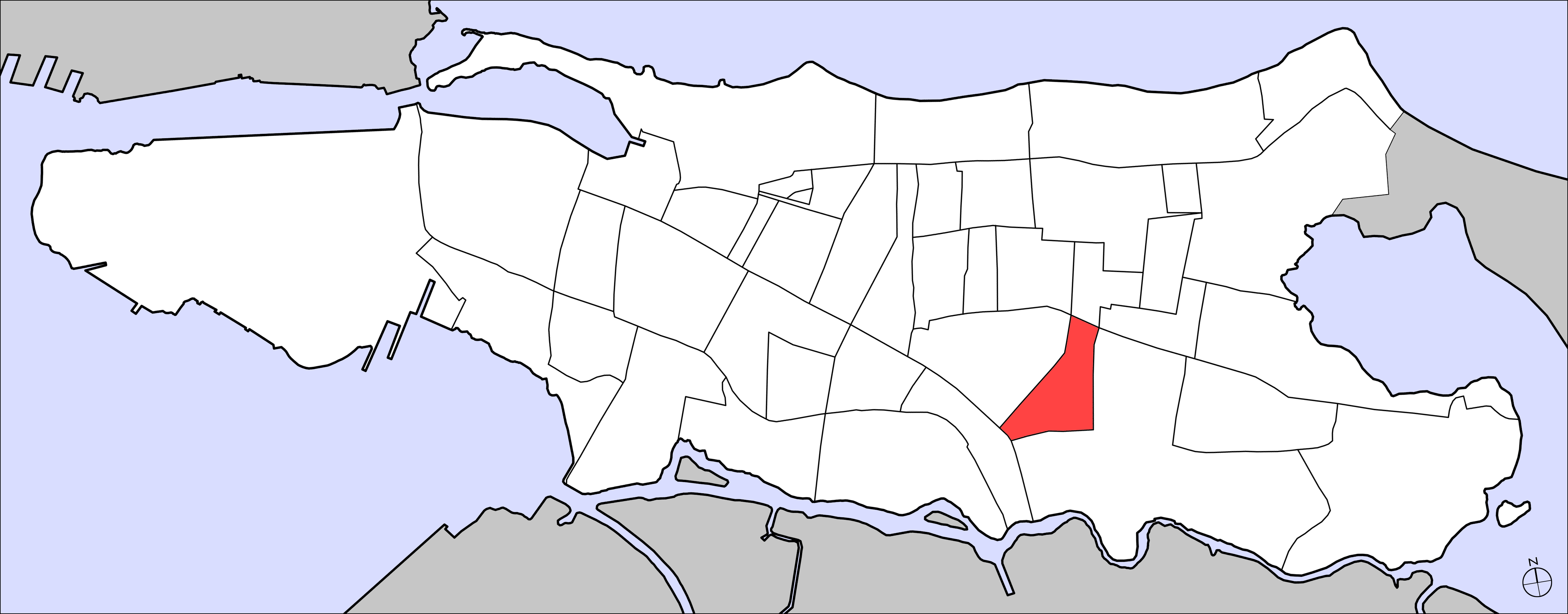
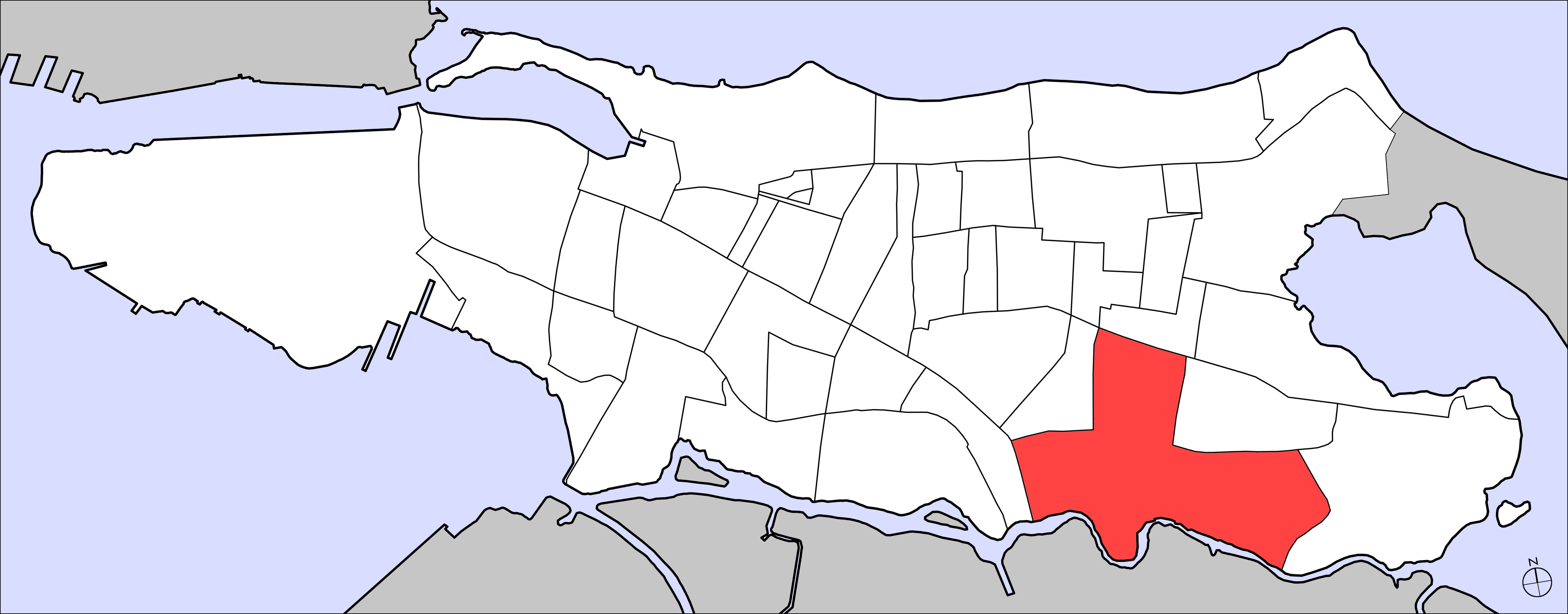
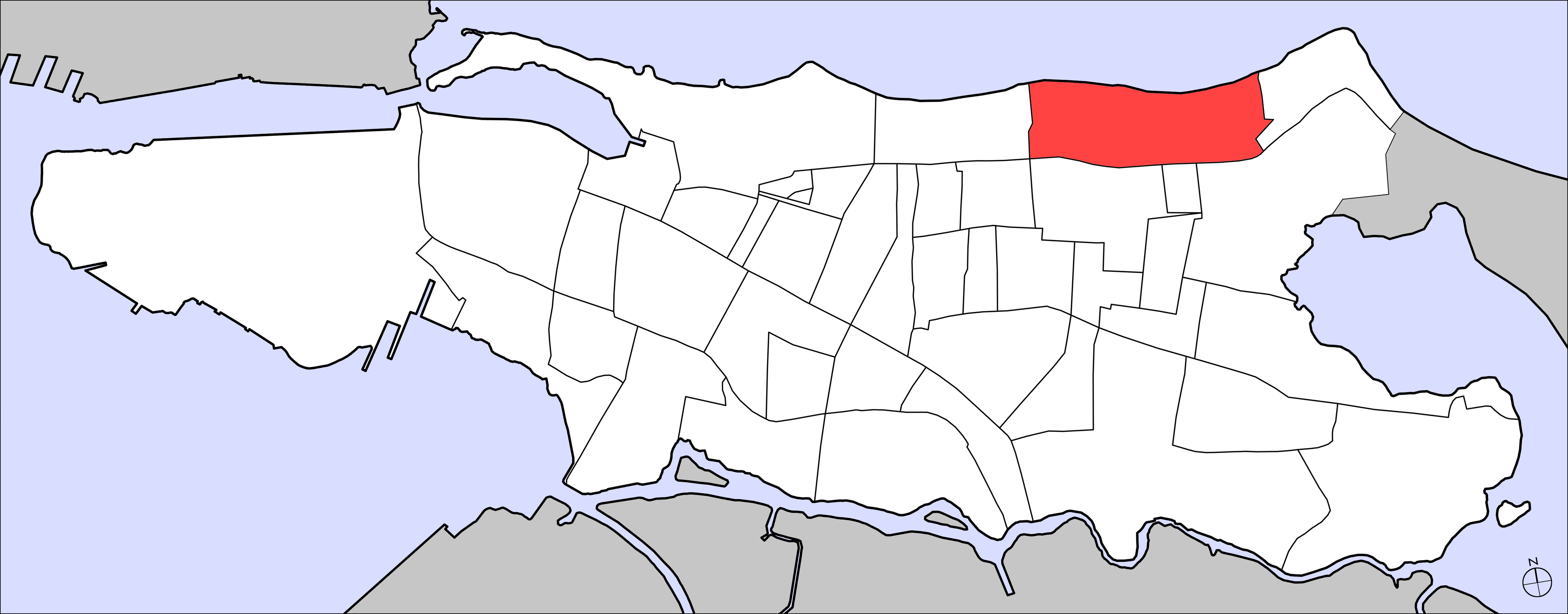
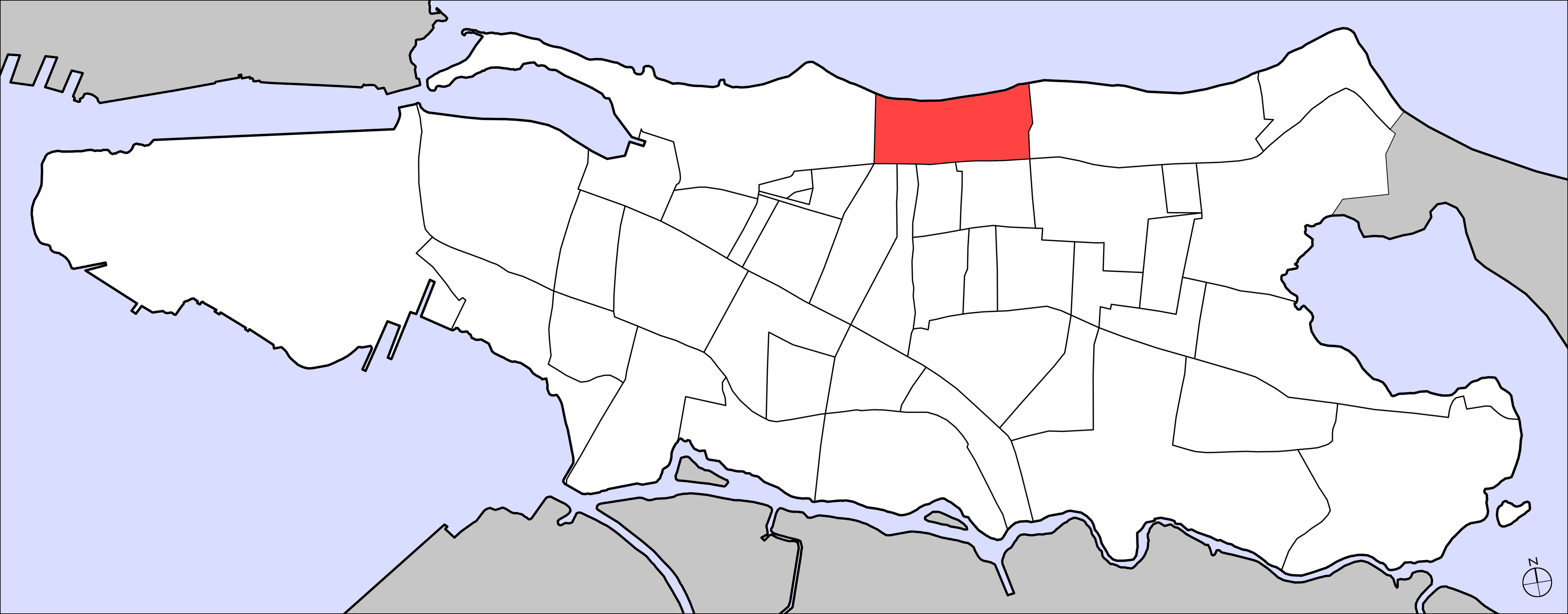
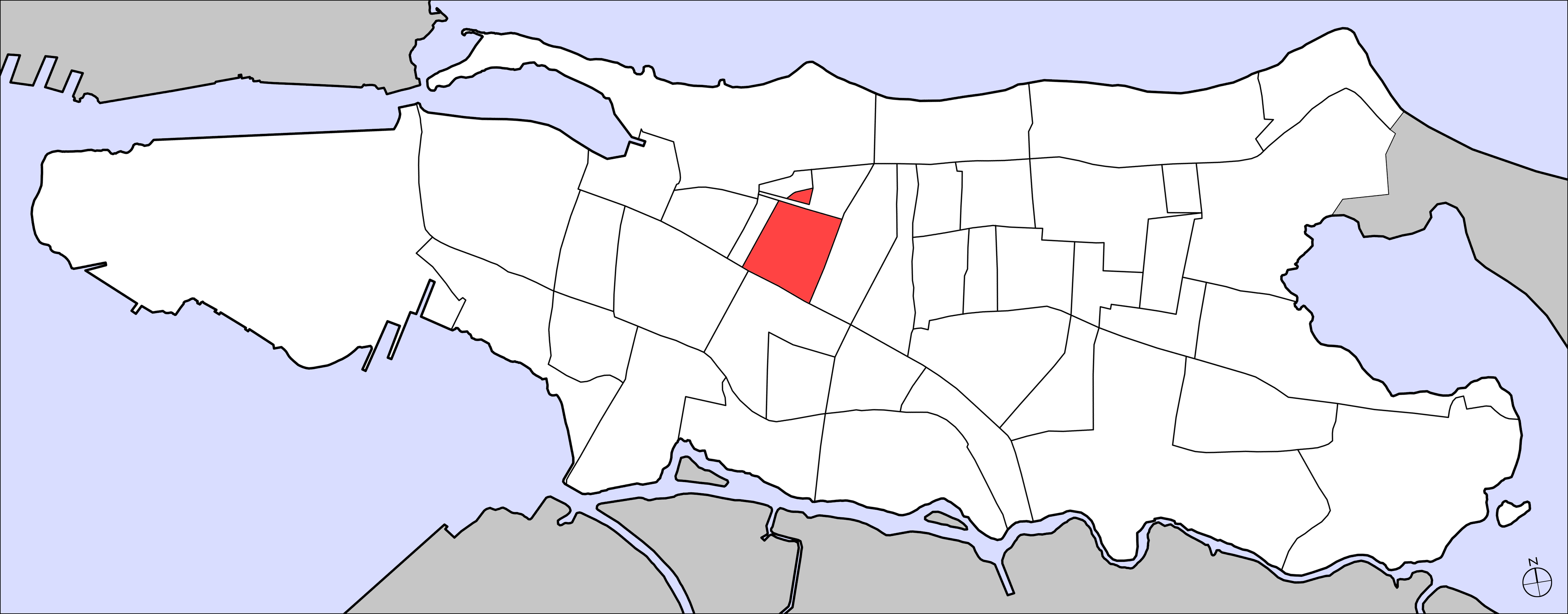
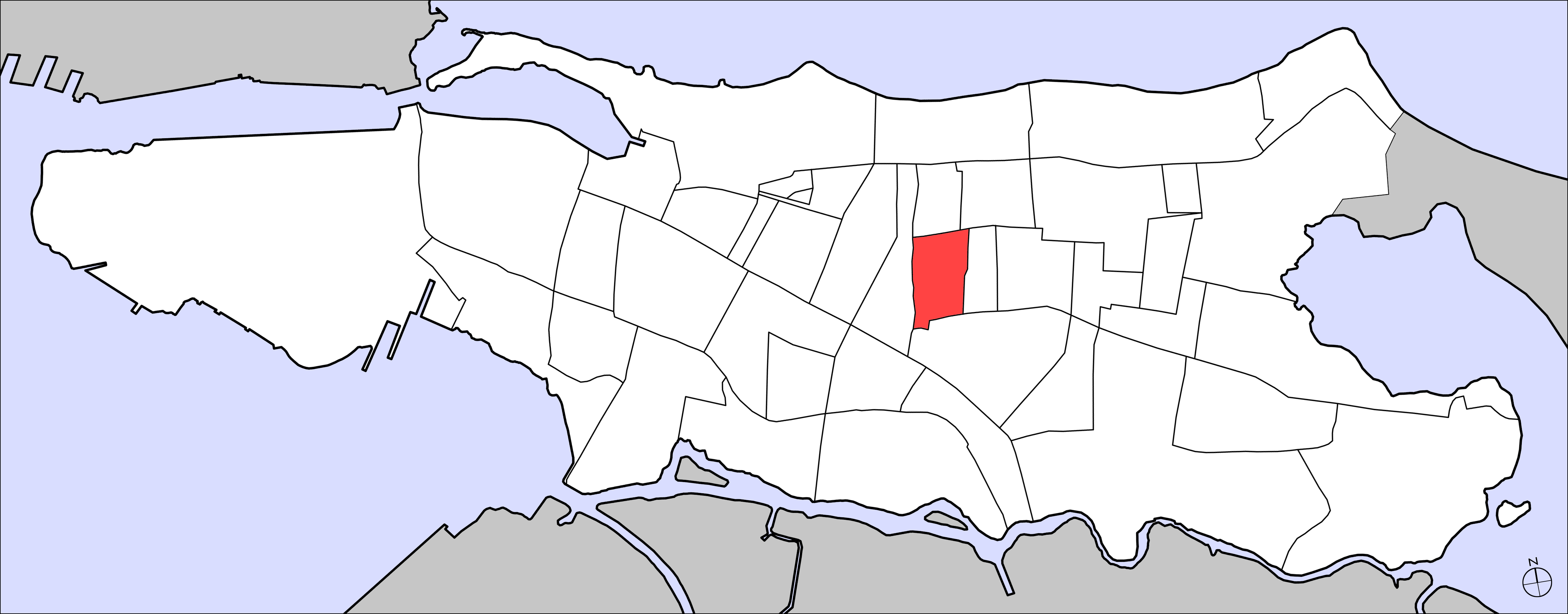
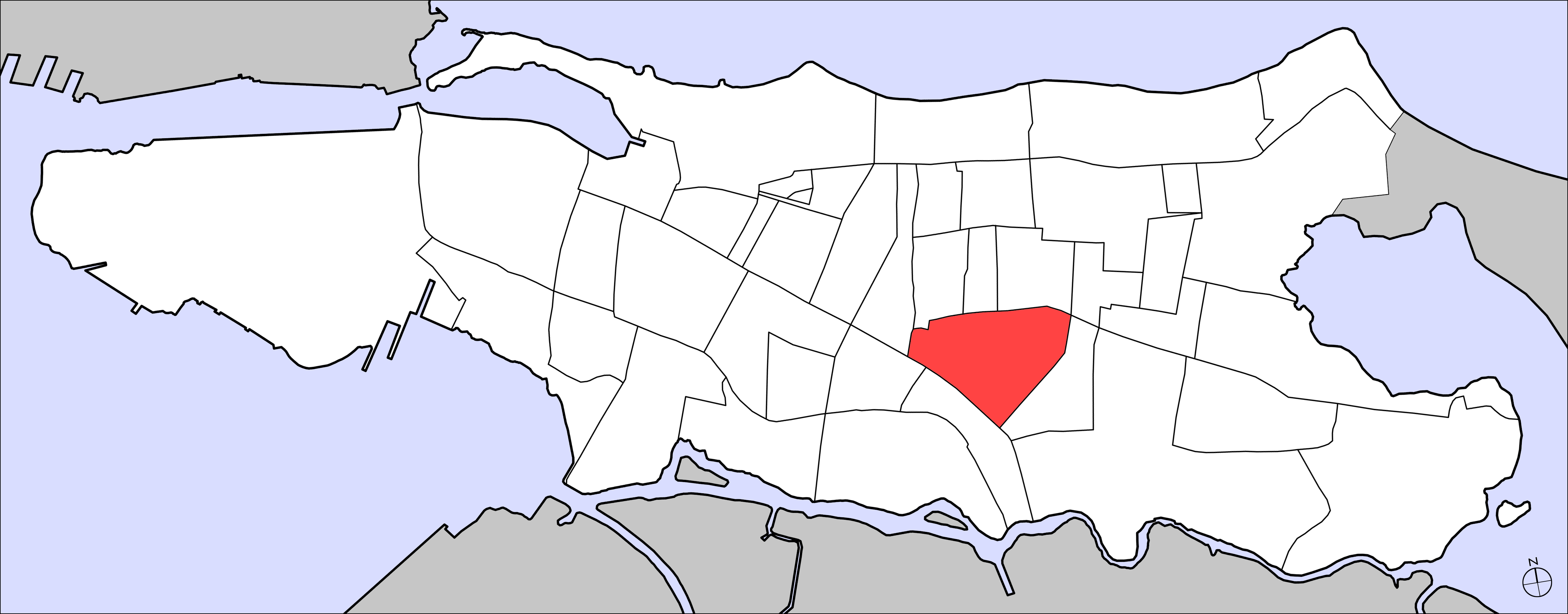
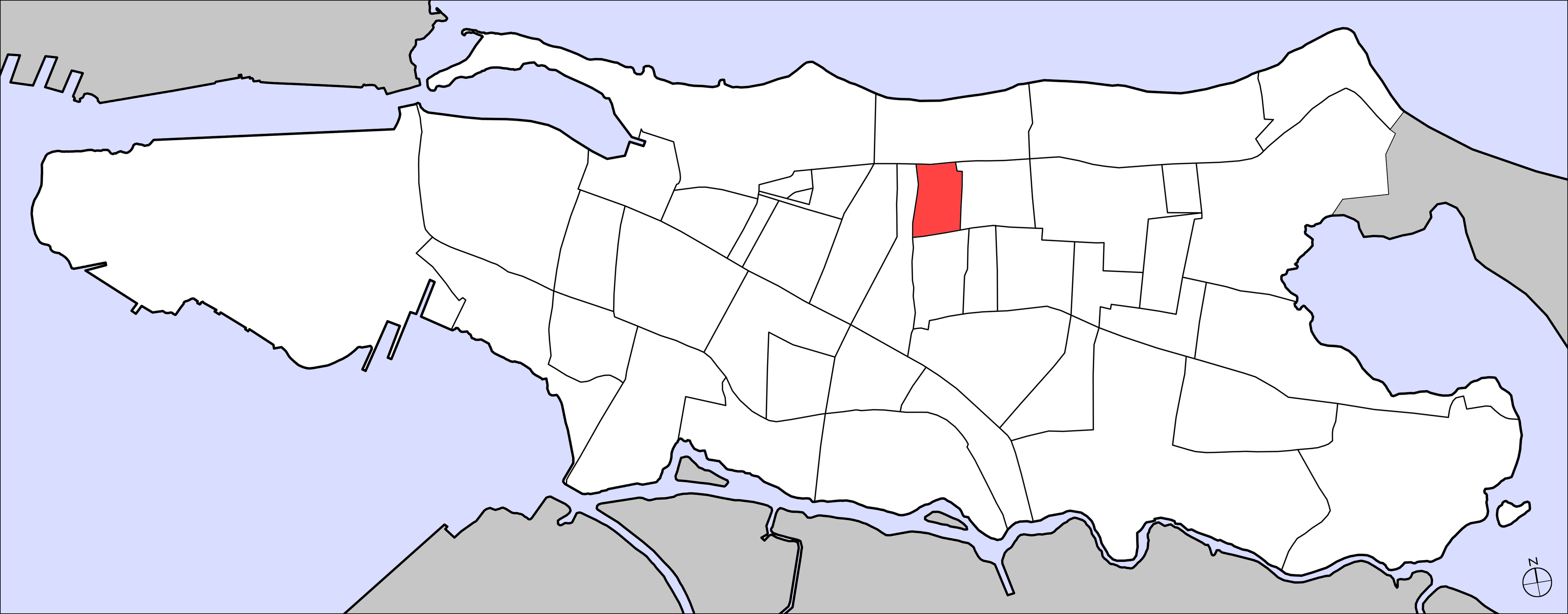
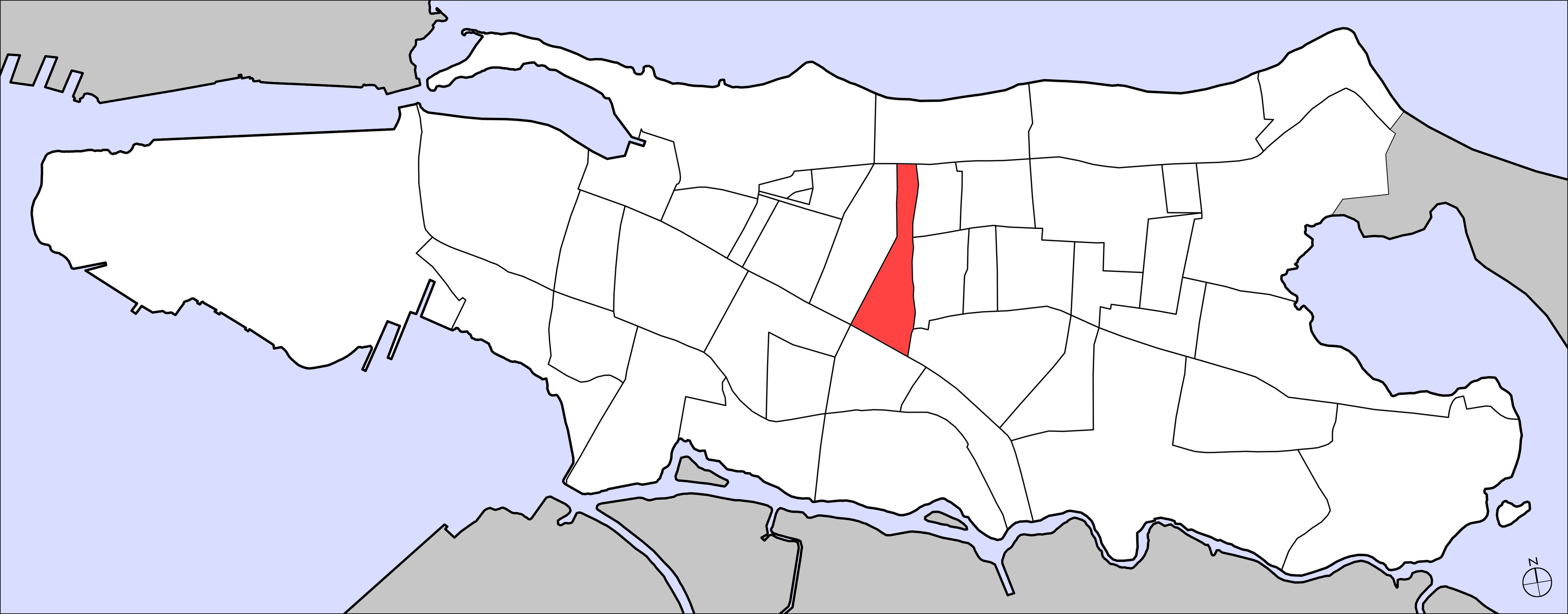
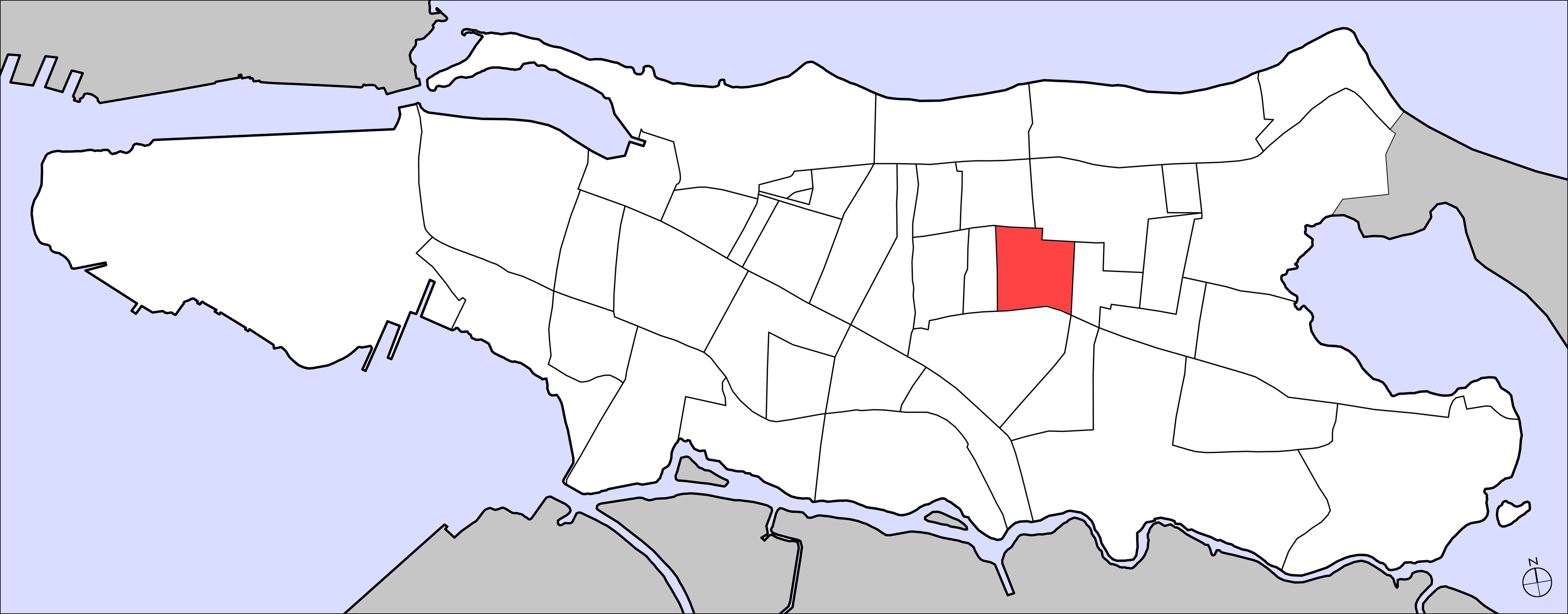
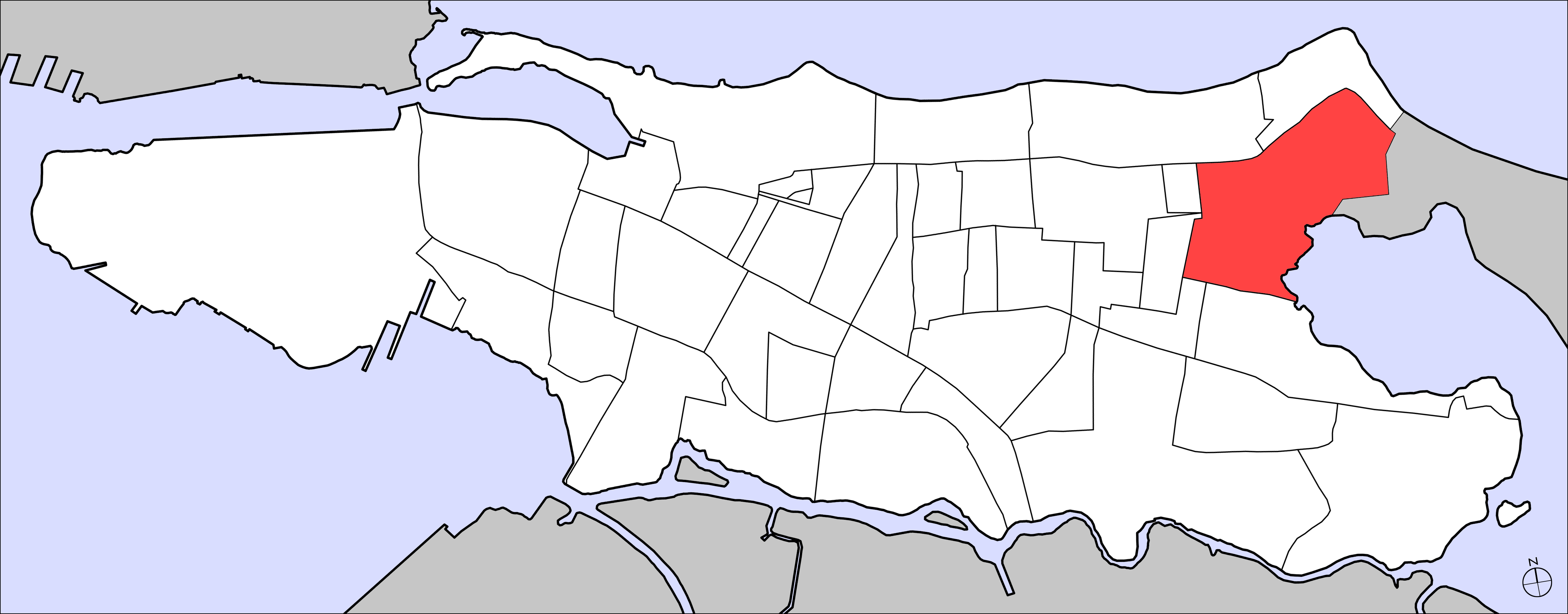
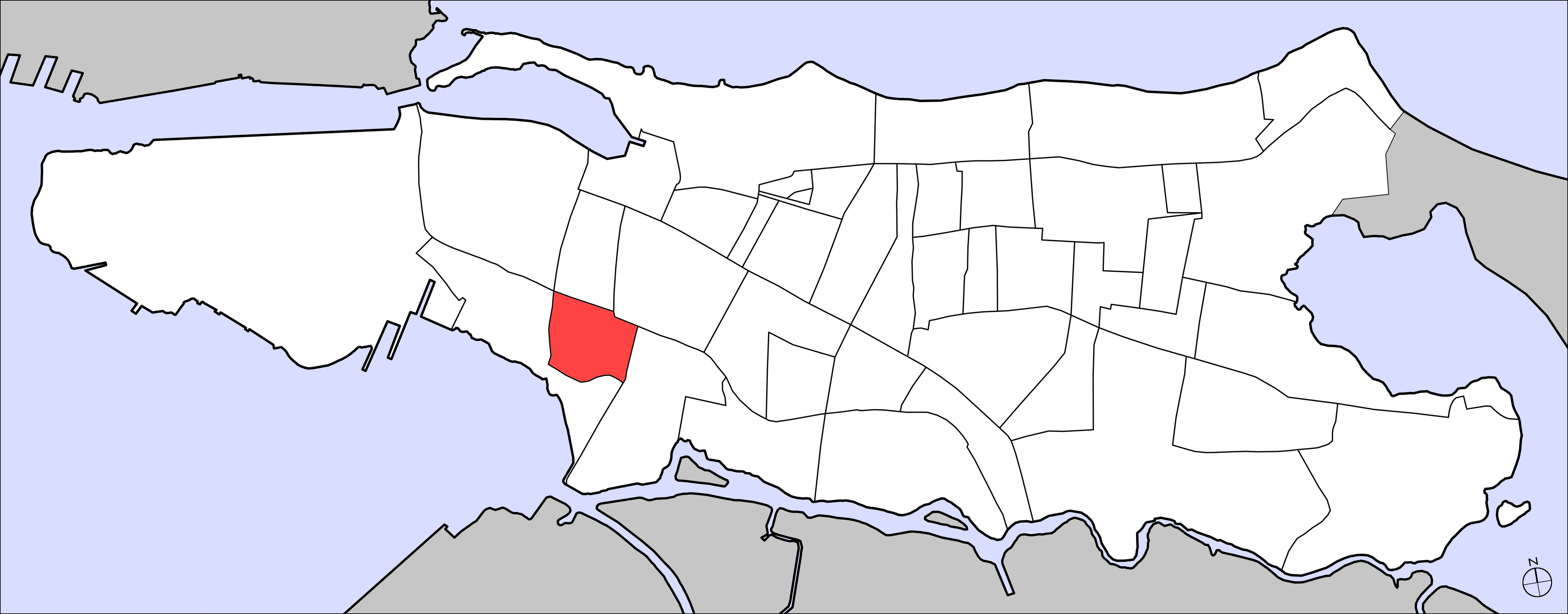
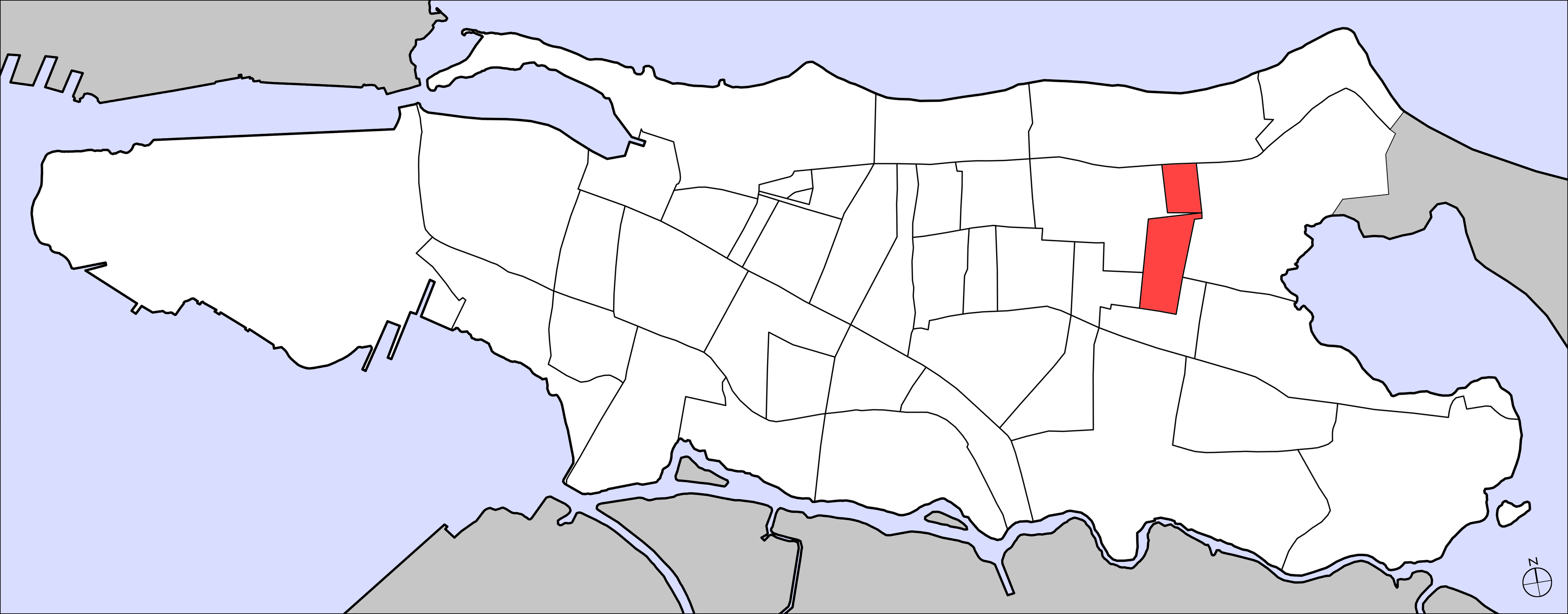
Subbarrios within Santurce

- Alto del Cabro
- Bayola
- Bolívar
- Buenos Aires
- Campo Alegre
- Chícharo
- Condadito
- Condado
- Figueroa
- Gandul
- Herrera
- Hipódromo
- Hoare
- Isla Grande
- Las Casas
- Las Marías
- Las Palmas
- La Zona
- Loíza
- Machuchal
- María Mozcó
- Marruecos
- Martín Peña
- Melilla
- Merhoff
- Minillas
- Miramar
- Monteflores
- Obrero
- Ocean Park
- Parque
- Pozo del Hato
- Pulguero
- Sagrado Corazón
- San Juan Moderno
- San Mateo
- Seboruco
- Shanghai
- Tras Talleres
- Villa Palmeras

=== Río Piedras ===
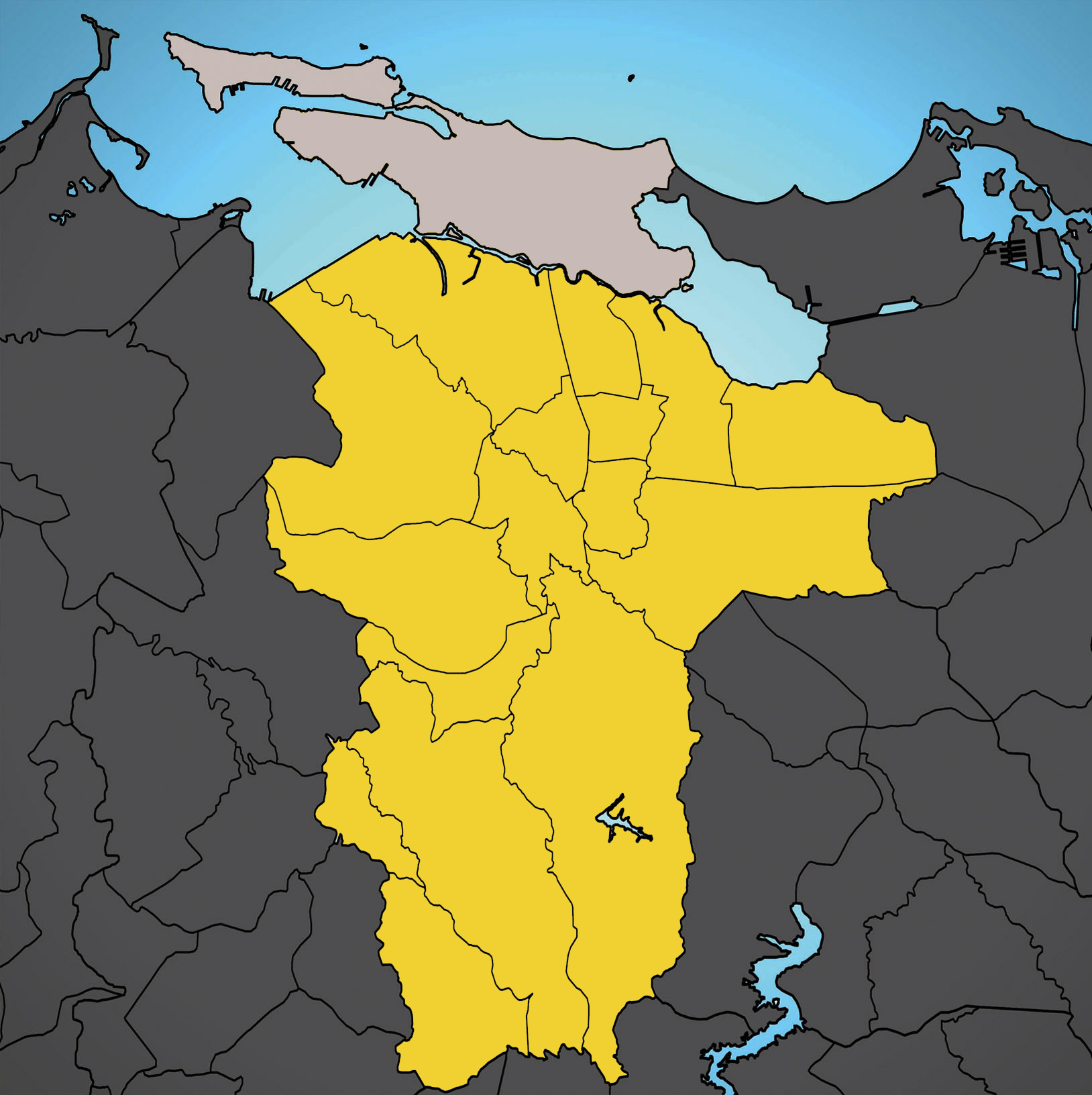
Río Piedras within San Juan (yellow)

In 1951, San Juan annexed the defunct municipality of Río Piedras as 16 barrios (alphabetically ordered):

=== Caimito ===
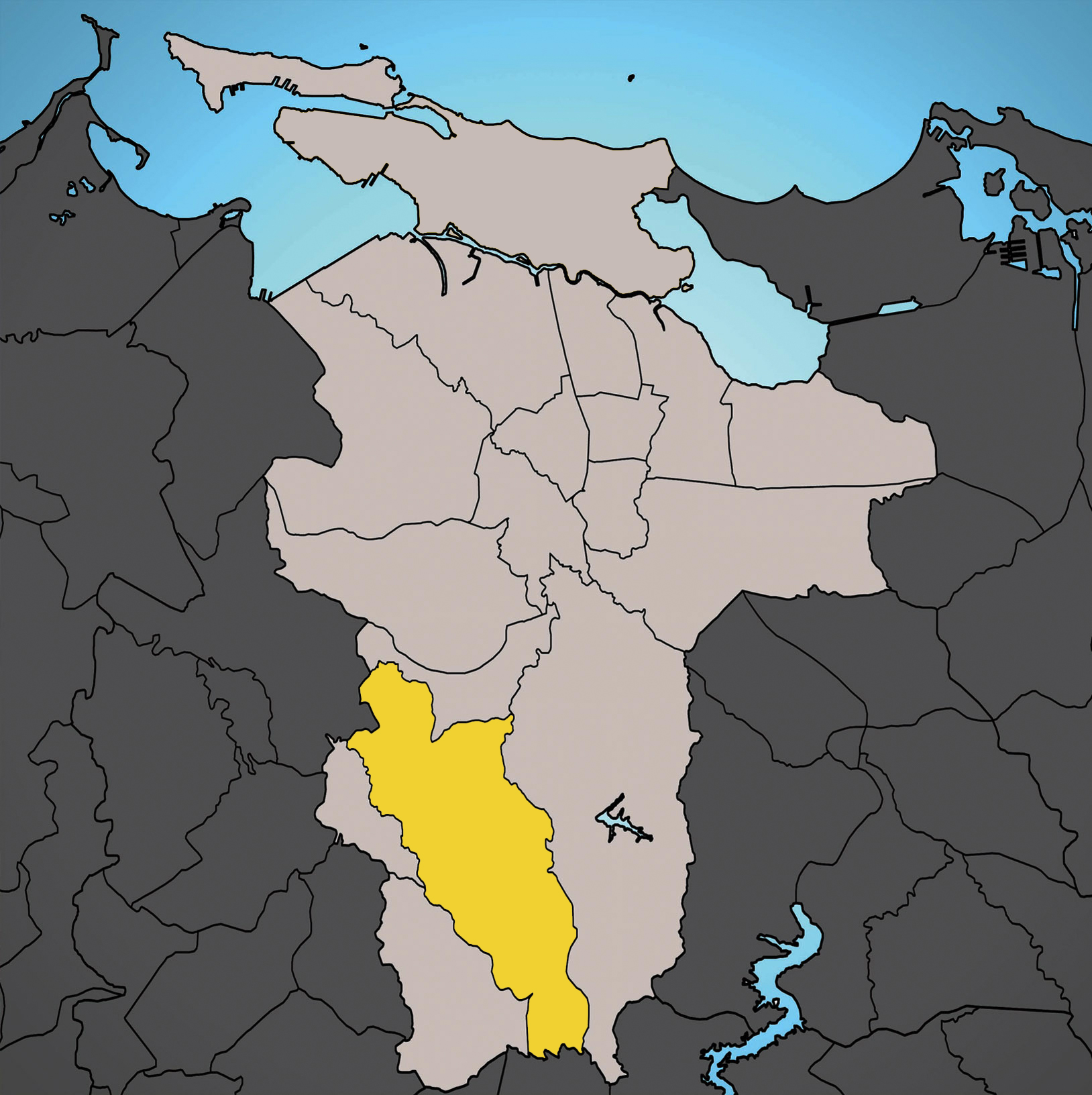
Caimito within San Juan

=== Cupey ===
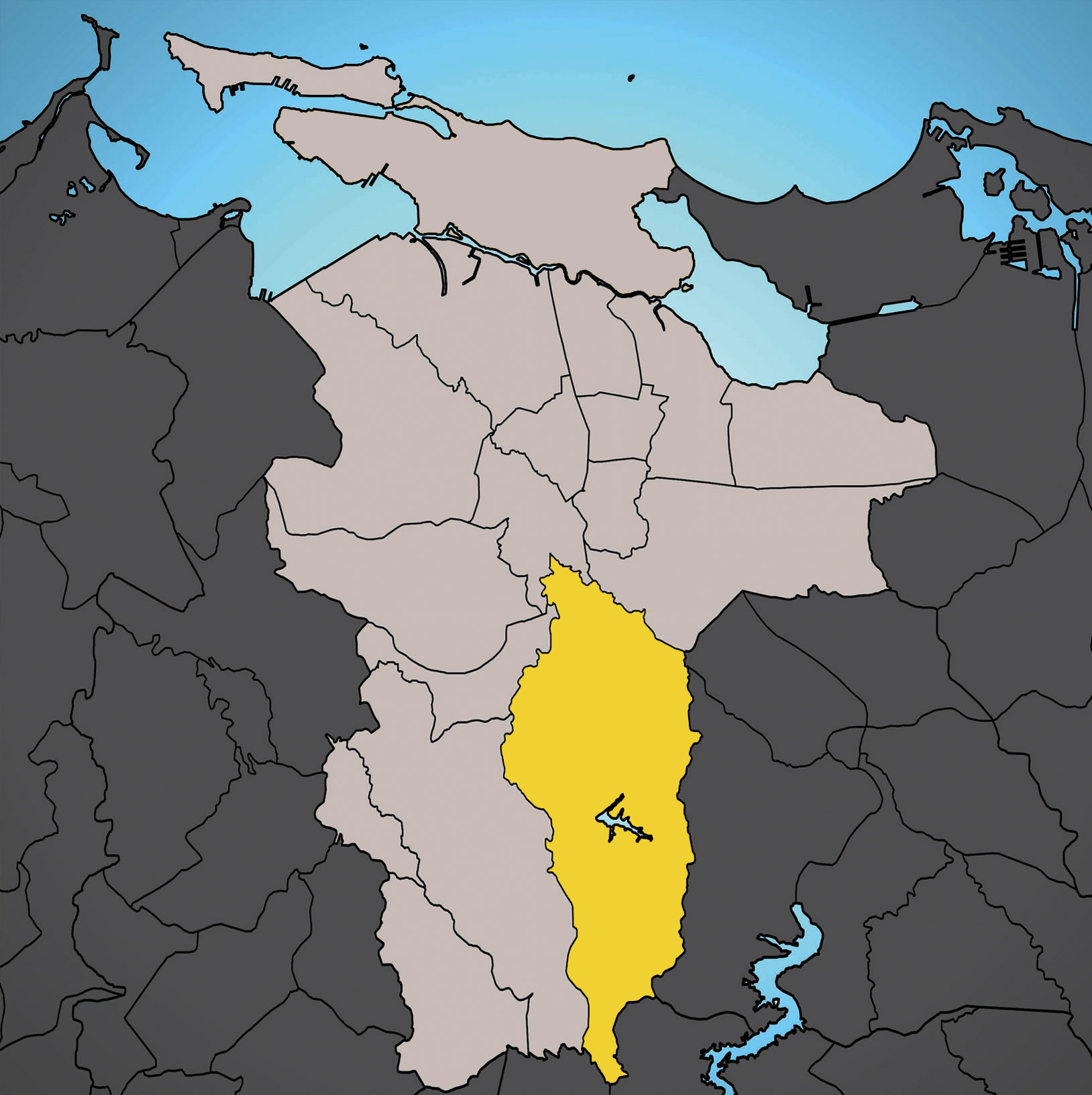
Cupey within San Juan

=== El Cinco ===
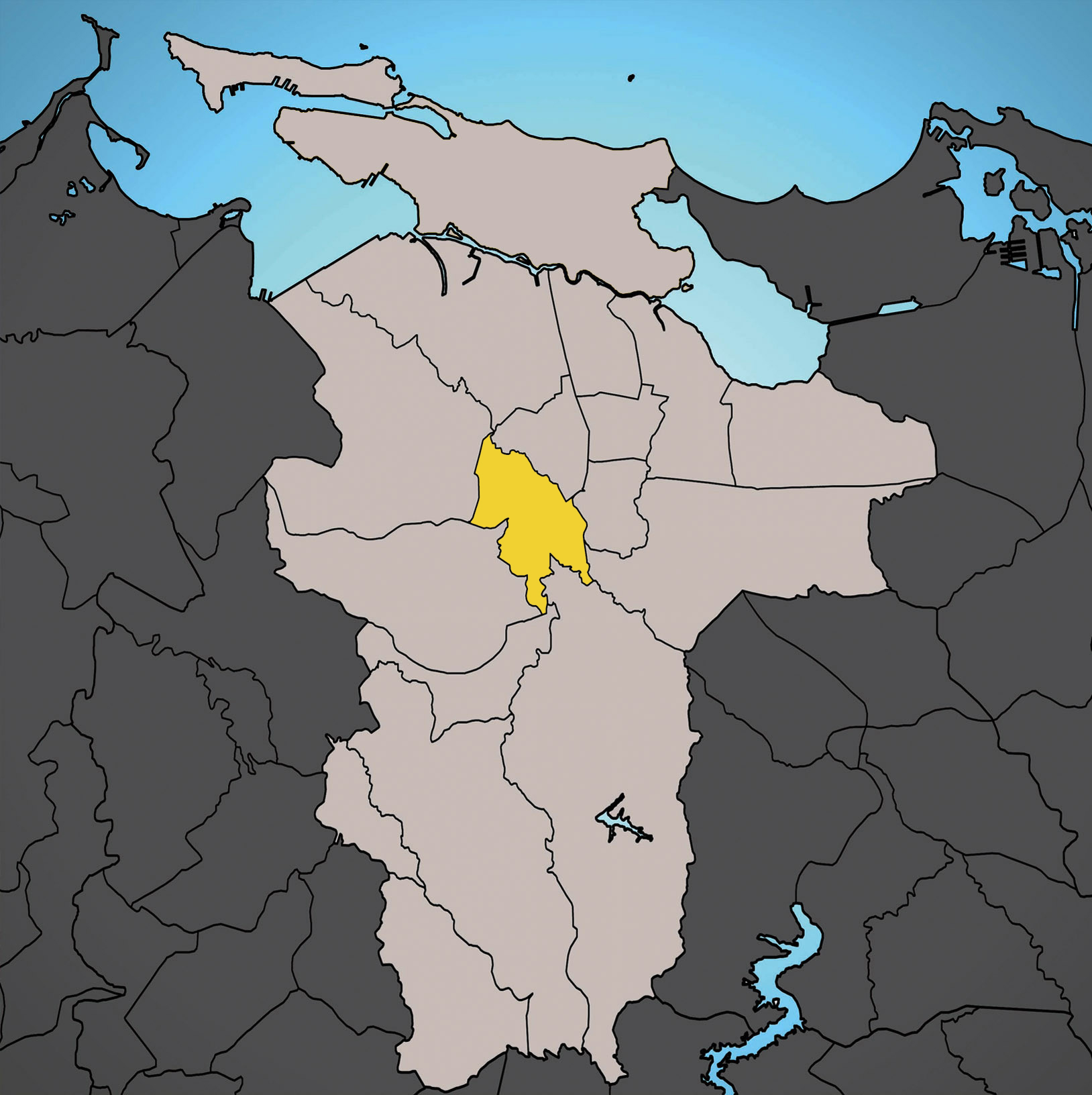
El Cinco within San Juan

=== Gobernador Piñero ===
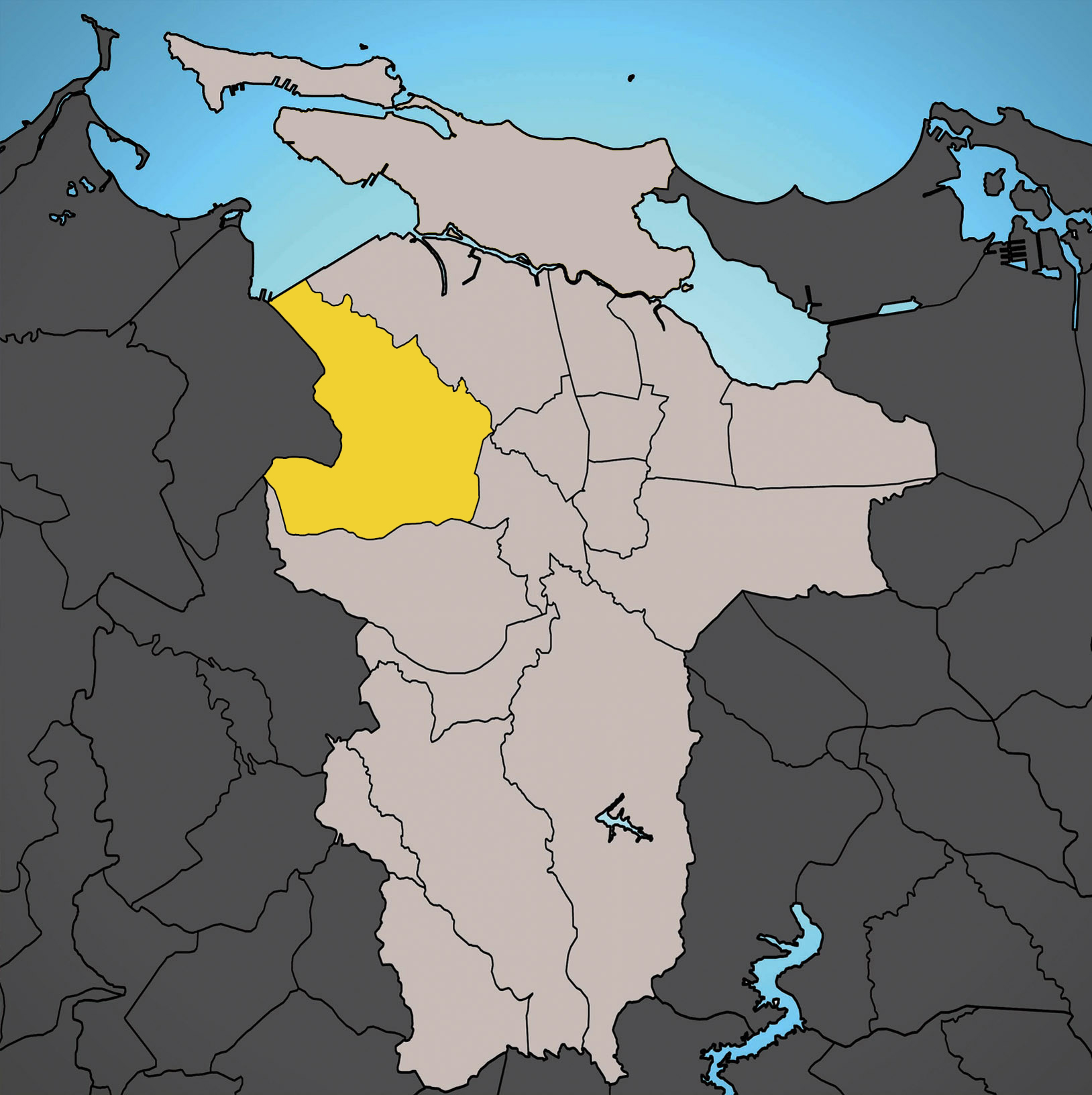
Gobernador Piñero within San Juan

=== Hato Rey Central ===
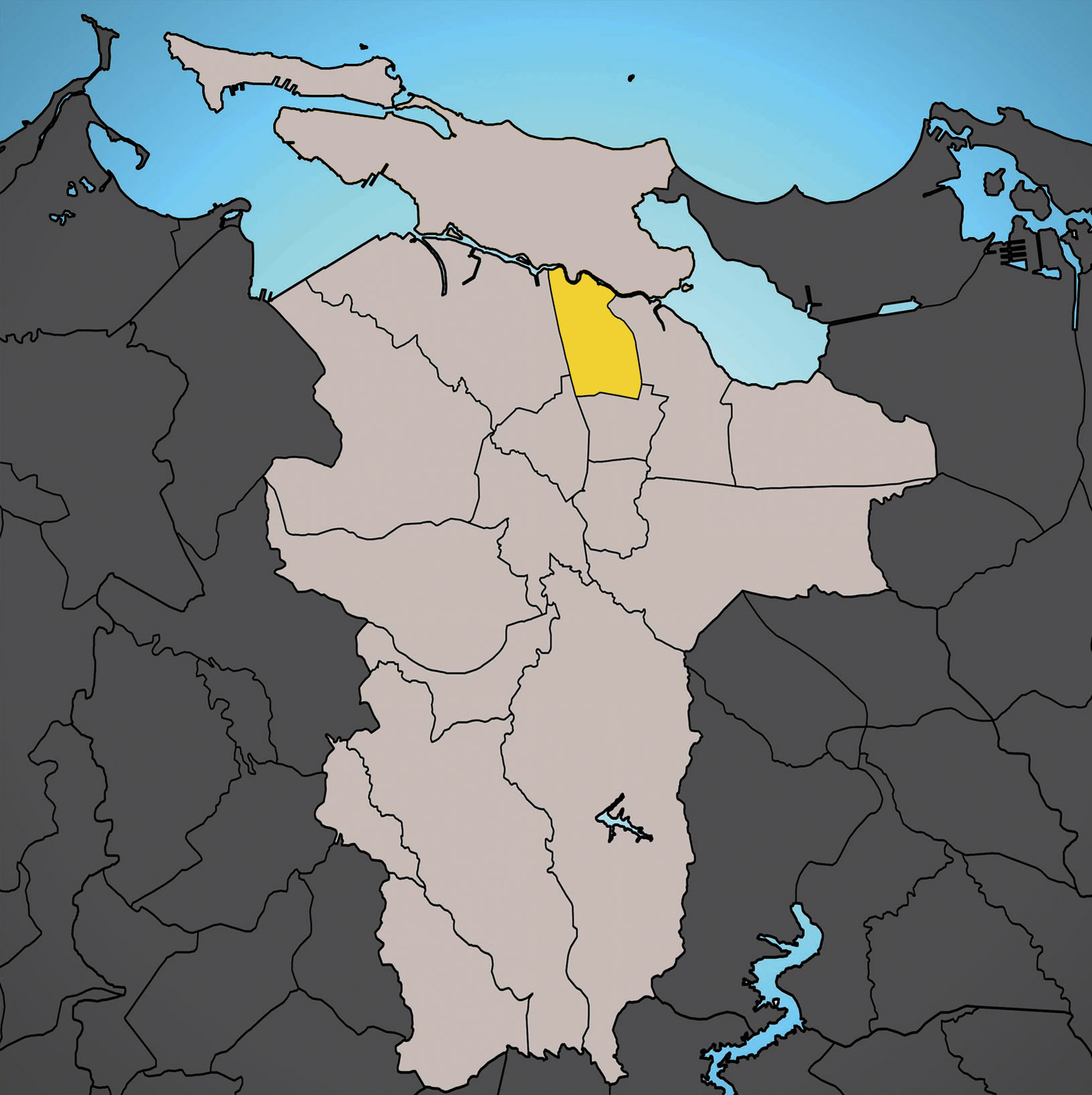
Hato Rey Central within San Juan

Hato Rey Central is divided into four subbarrios or districts:

- Ciudad Nueva
- Floral Park
- Las Monjas
- Quintana

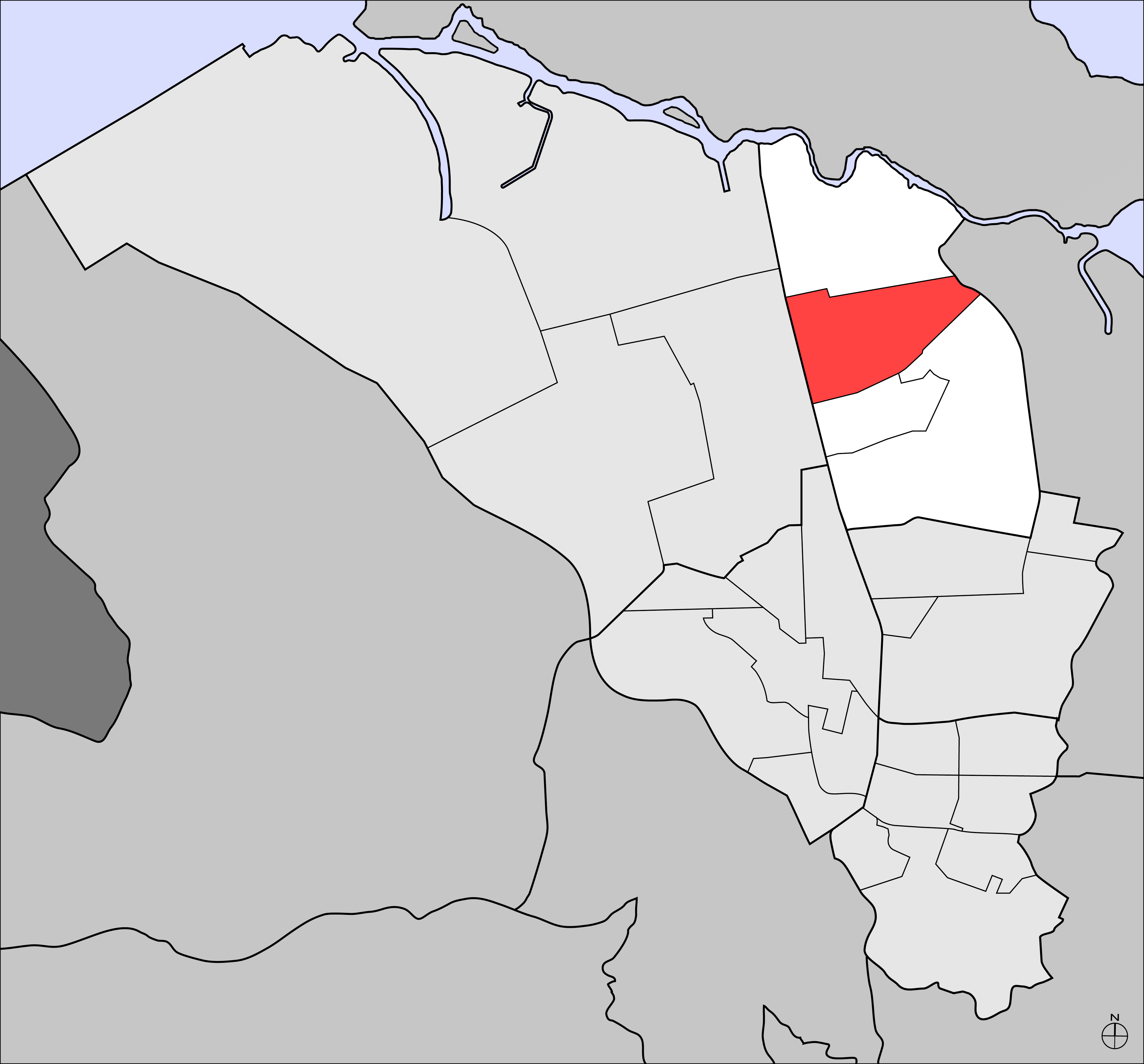
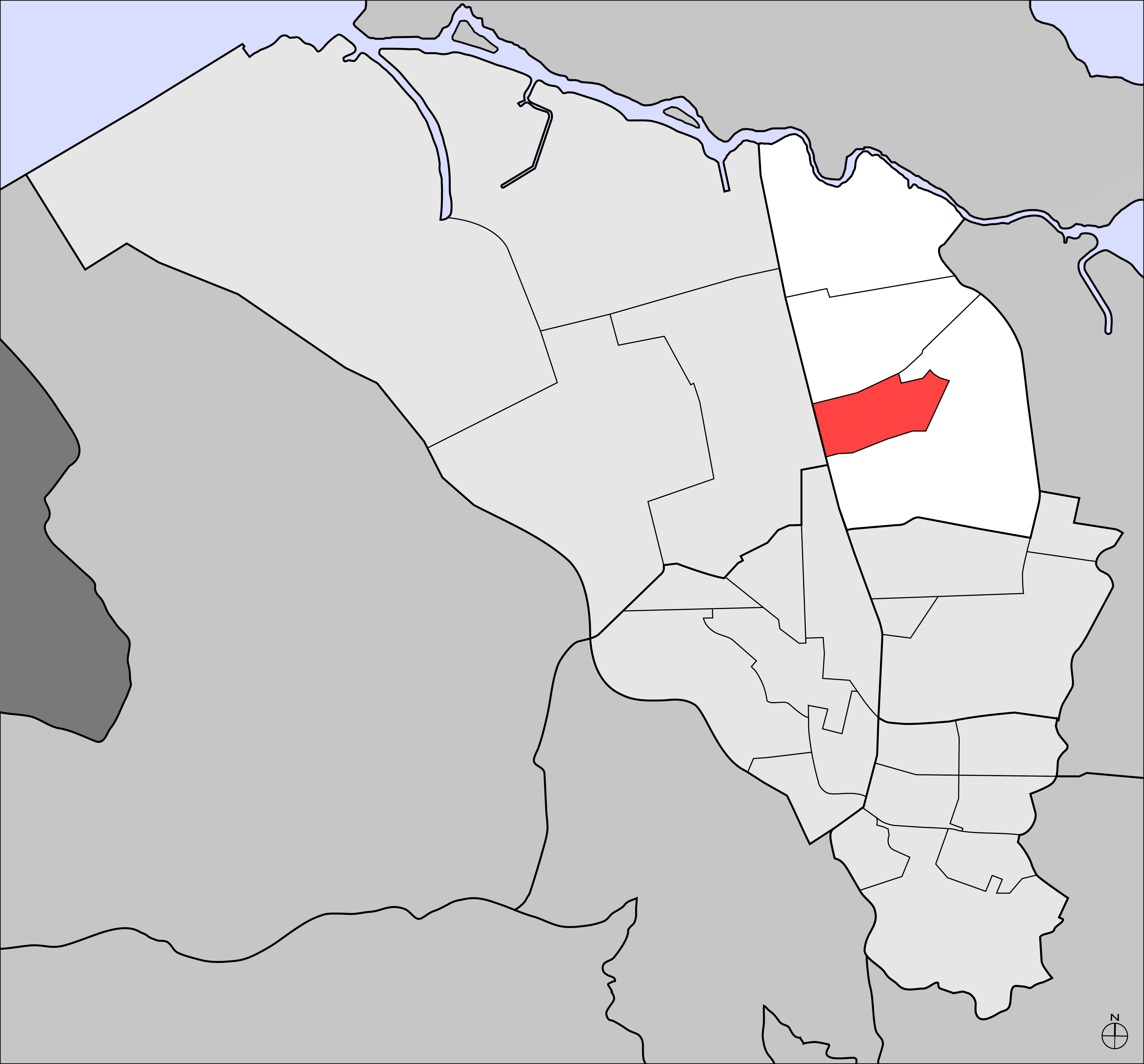
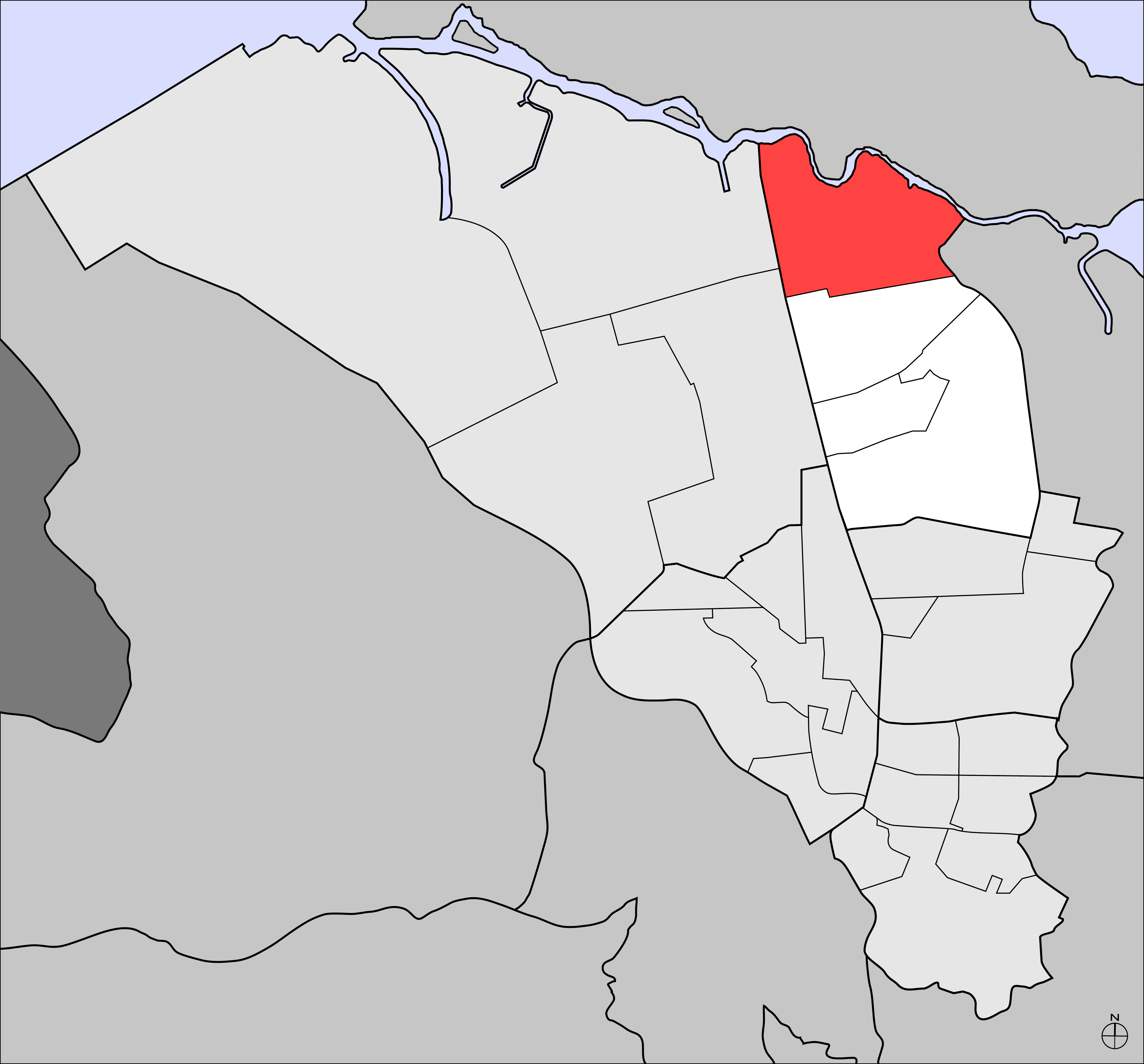
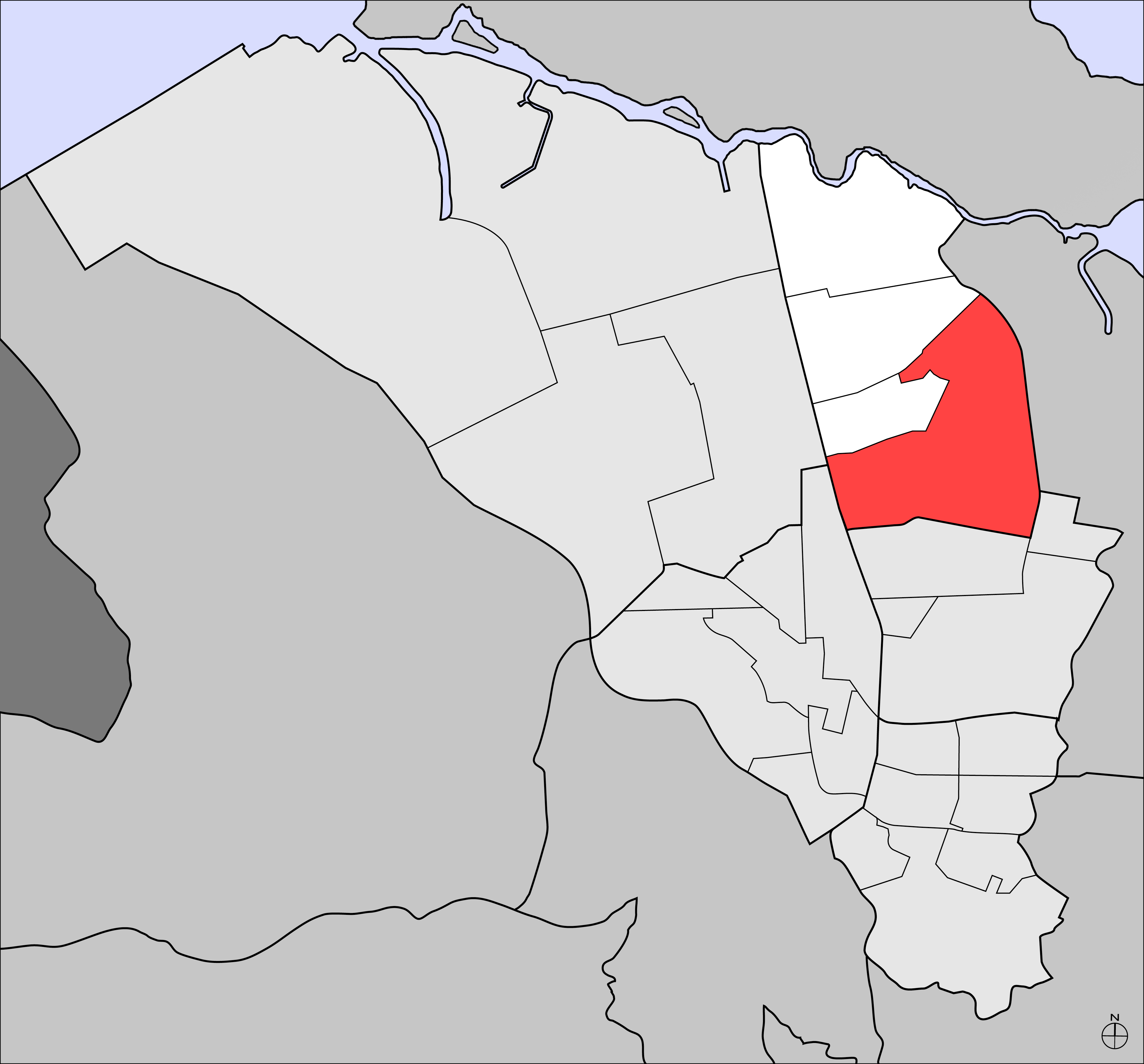
Subbarrios within Hato Rey Central

=== Hato Rey Norte ===
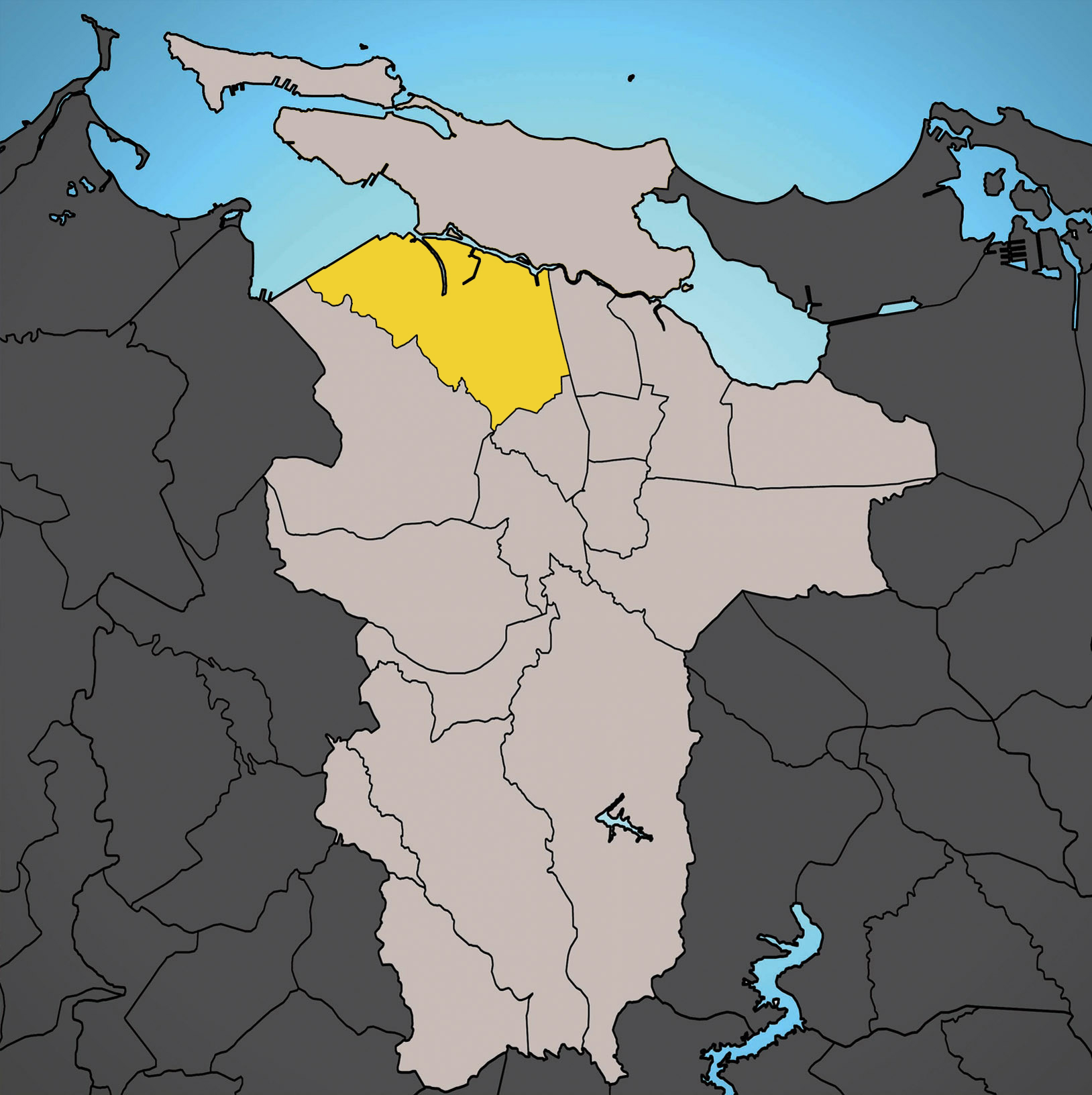
Hato Rey Norte within San Juan

Hato Rey Norte is divided into four subbarrios or districts:

- El Vedado
- Eleanor Roosevelt
- Martín Peña
- Puerto Nuevo

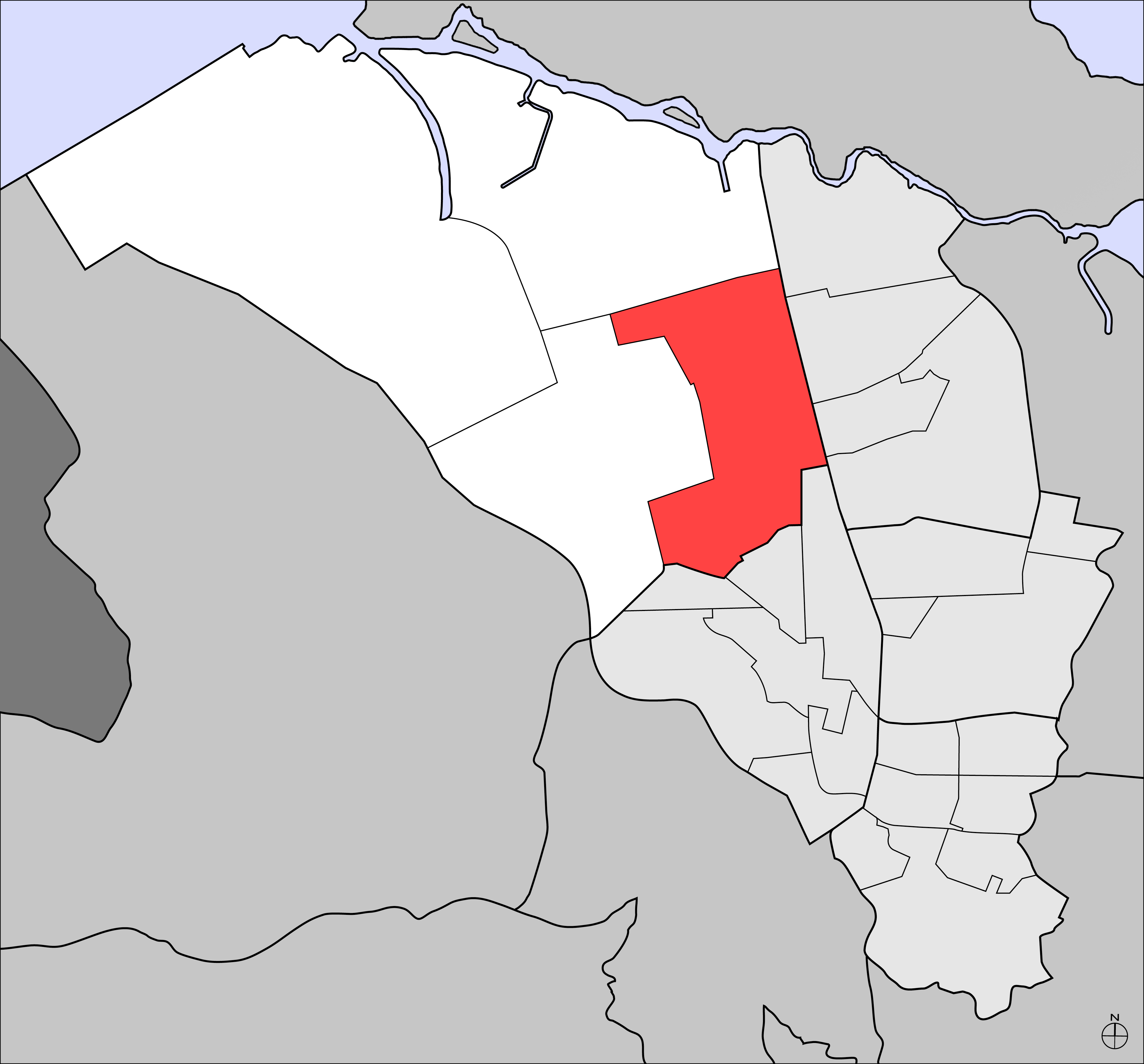
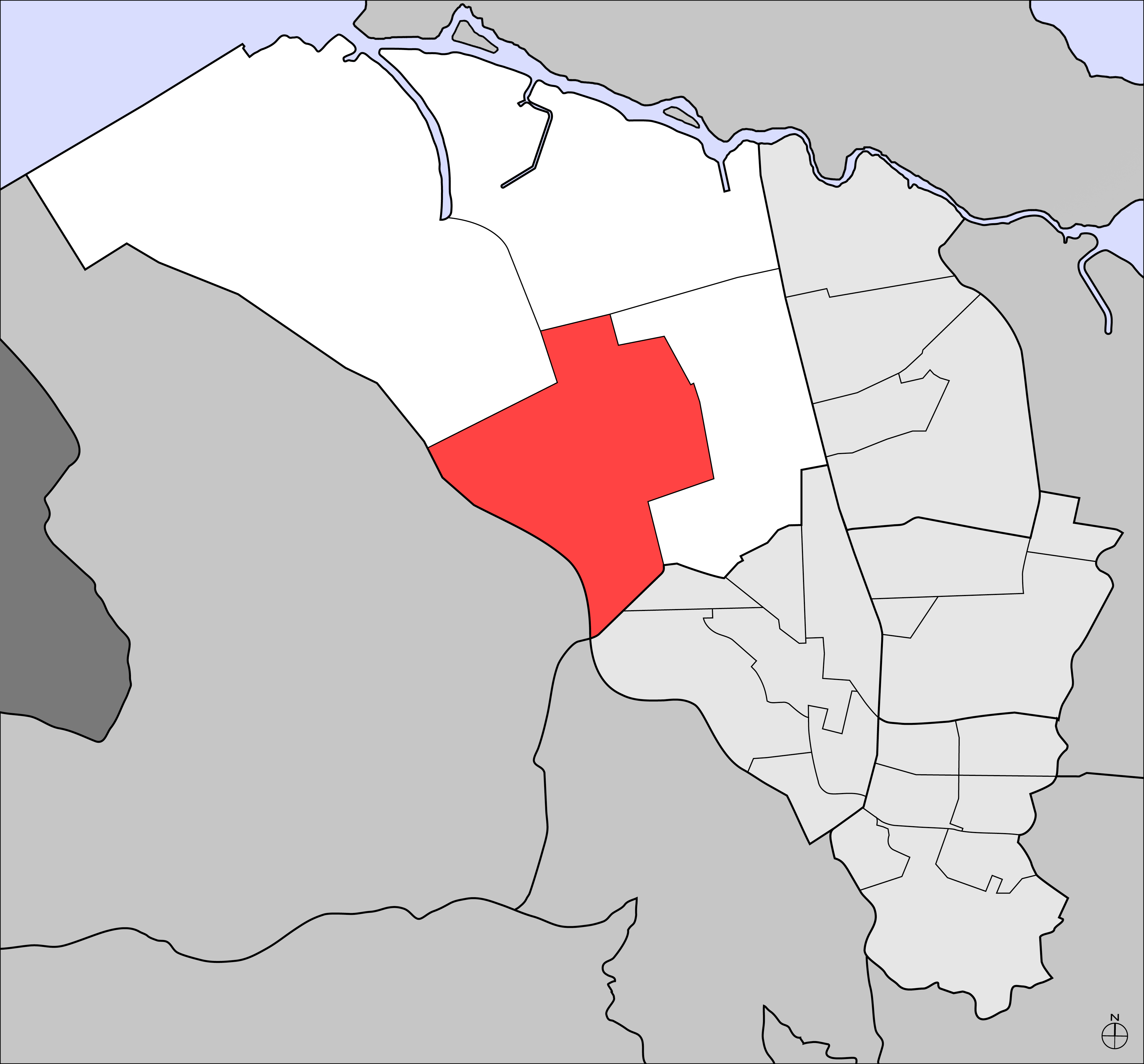
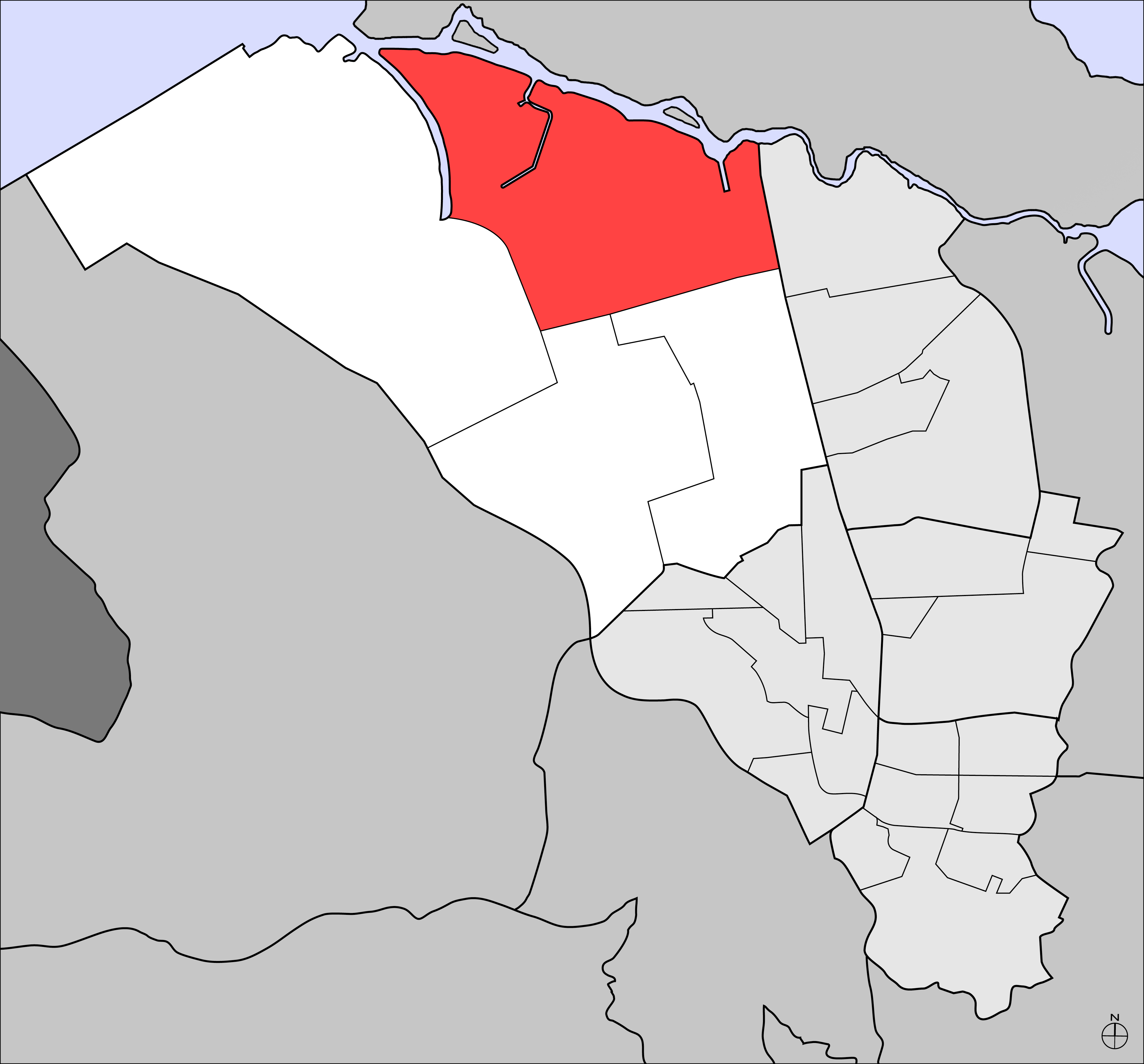
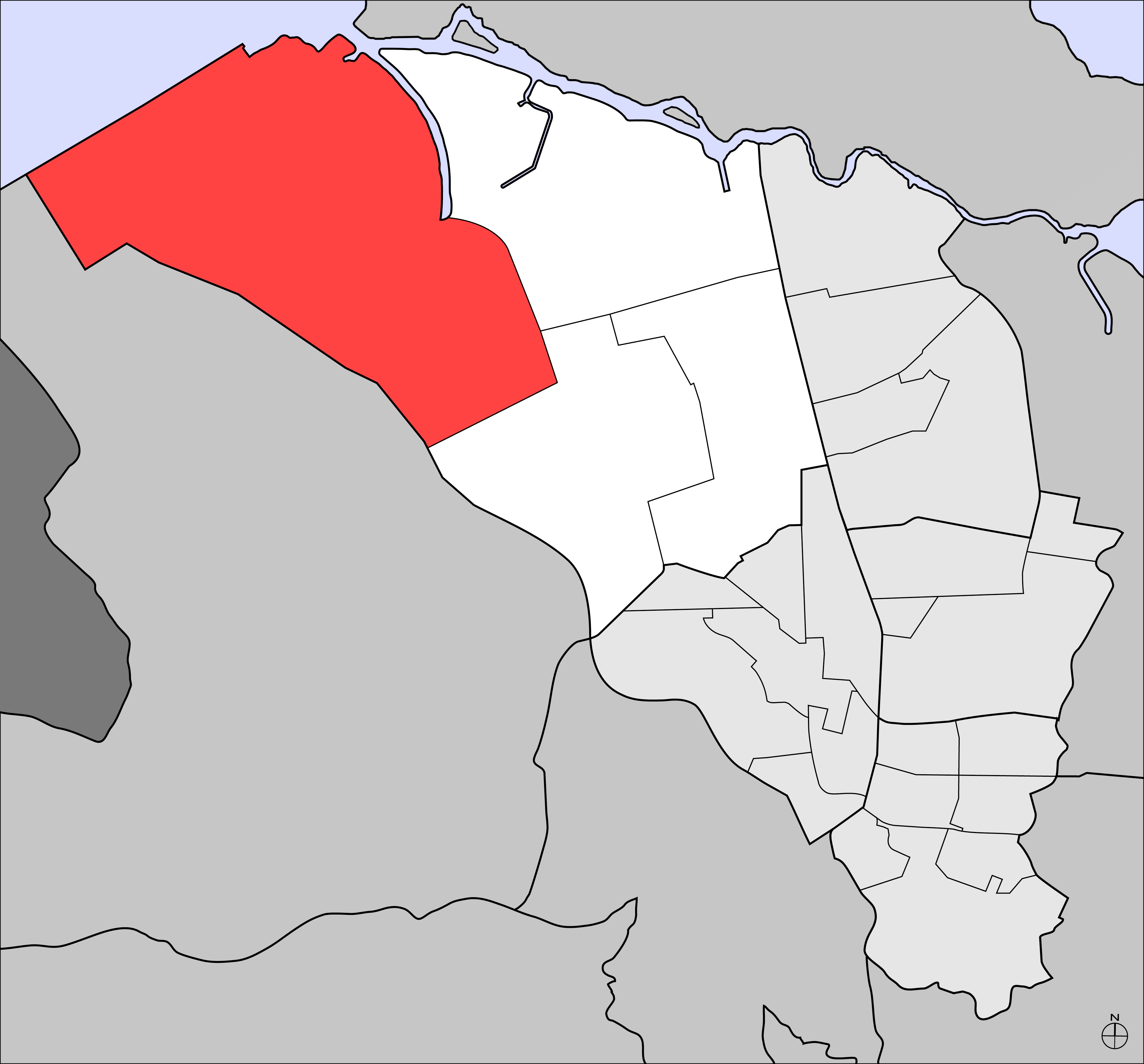
Subbarrios within Hato Rey Norte

=== Hato Rey Sur ===
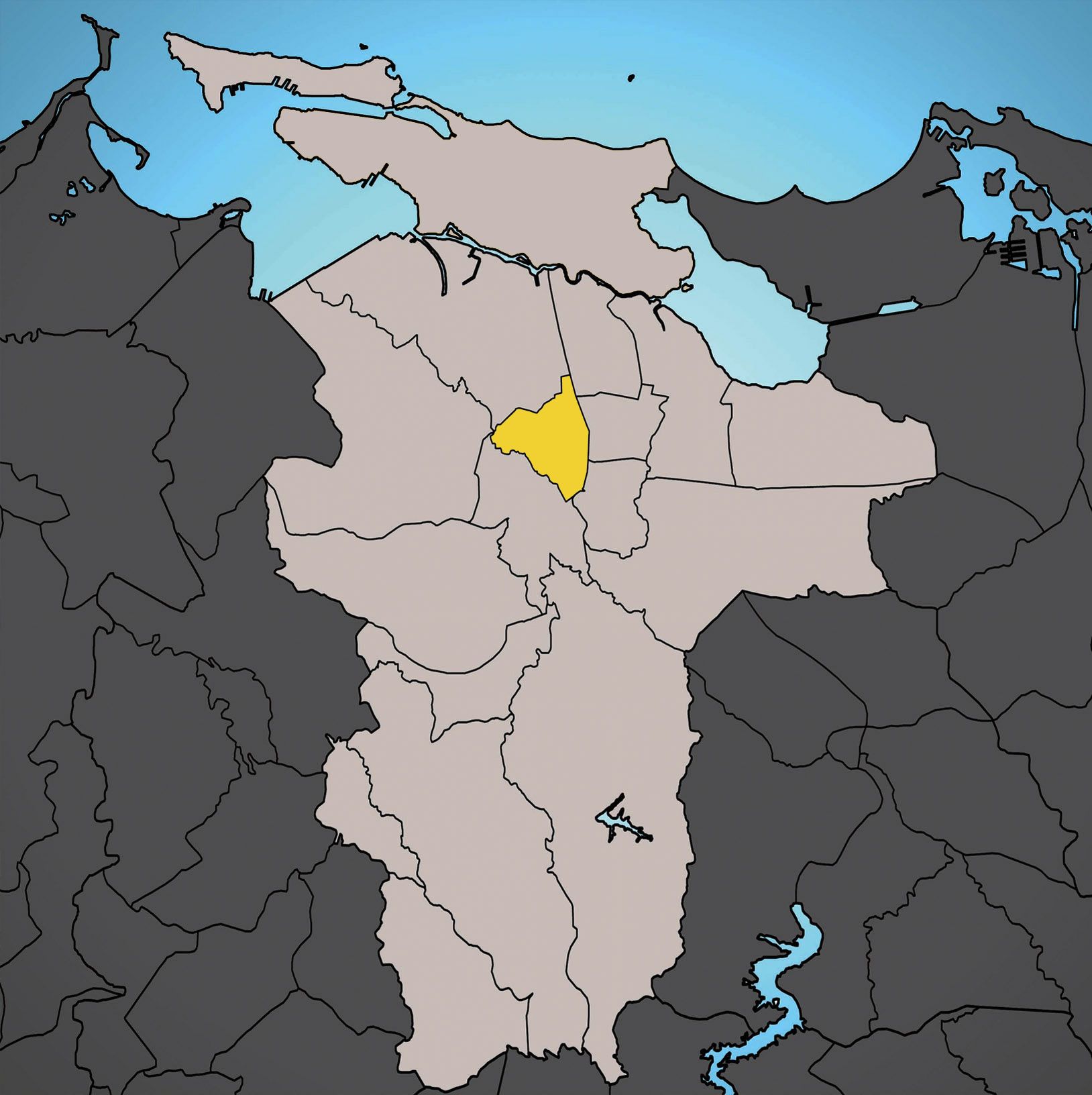
Hato Rey Sur within San Juan

Hato Rey Sur is divided into four subbarrios or districts:

- Bella Vista
- Hyde Park
- La 37
- Santa Rita

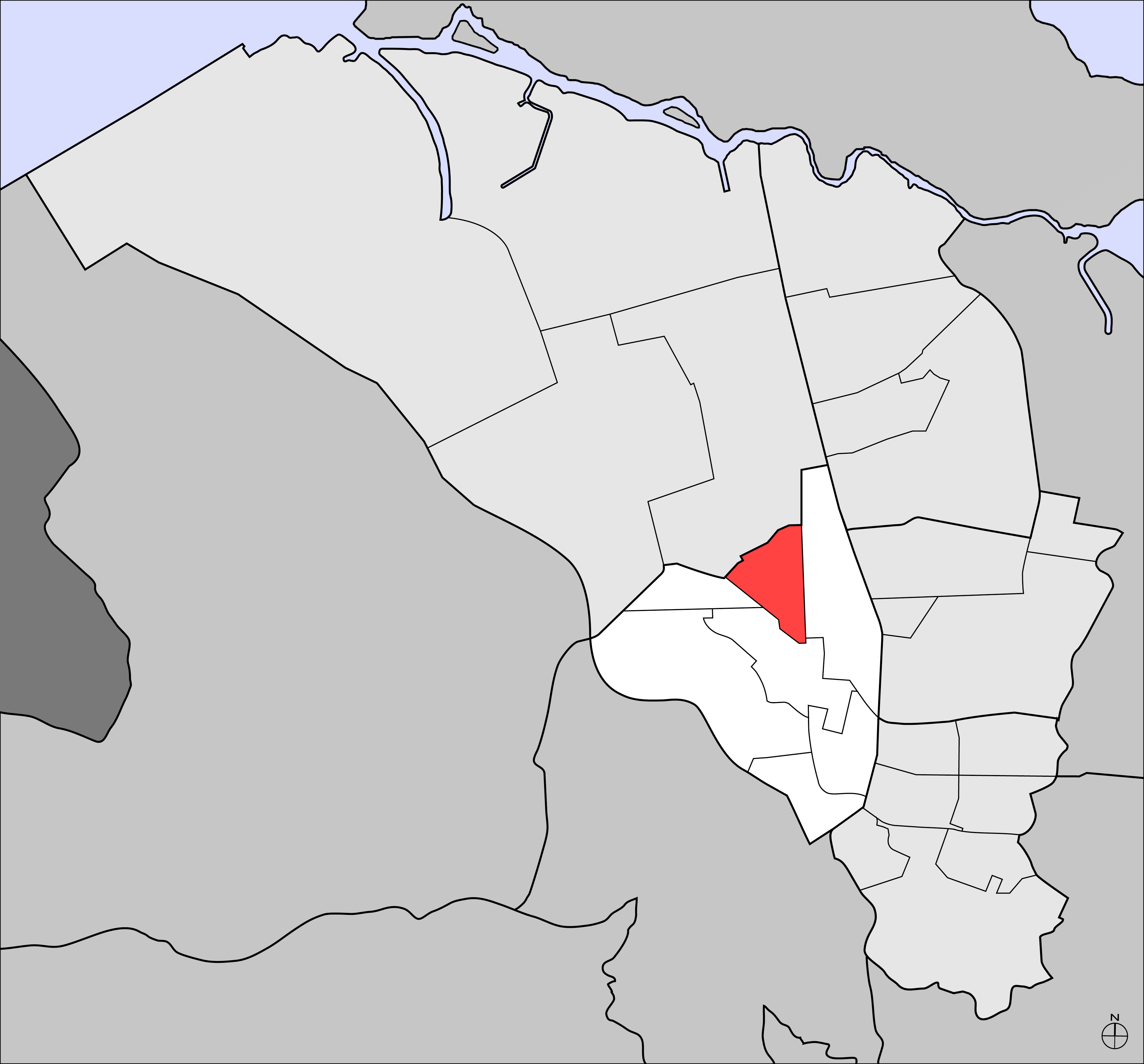
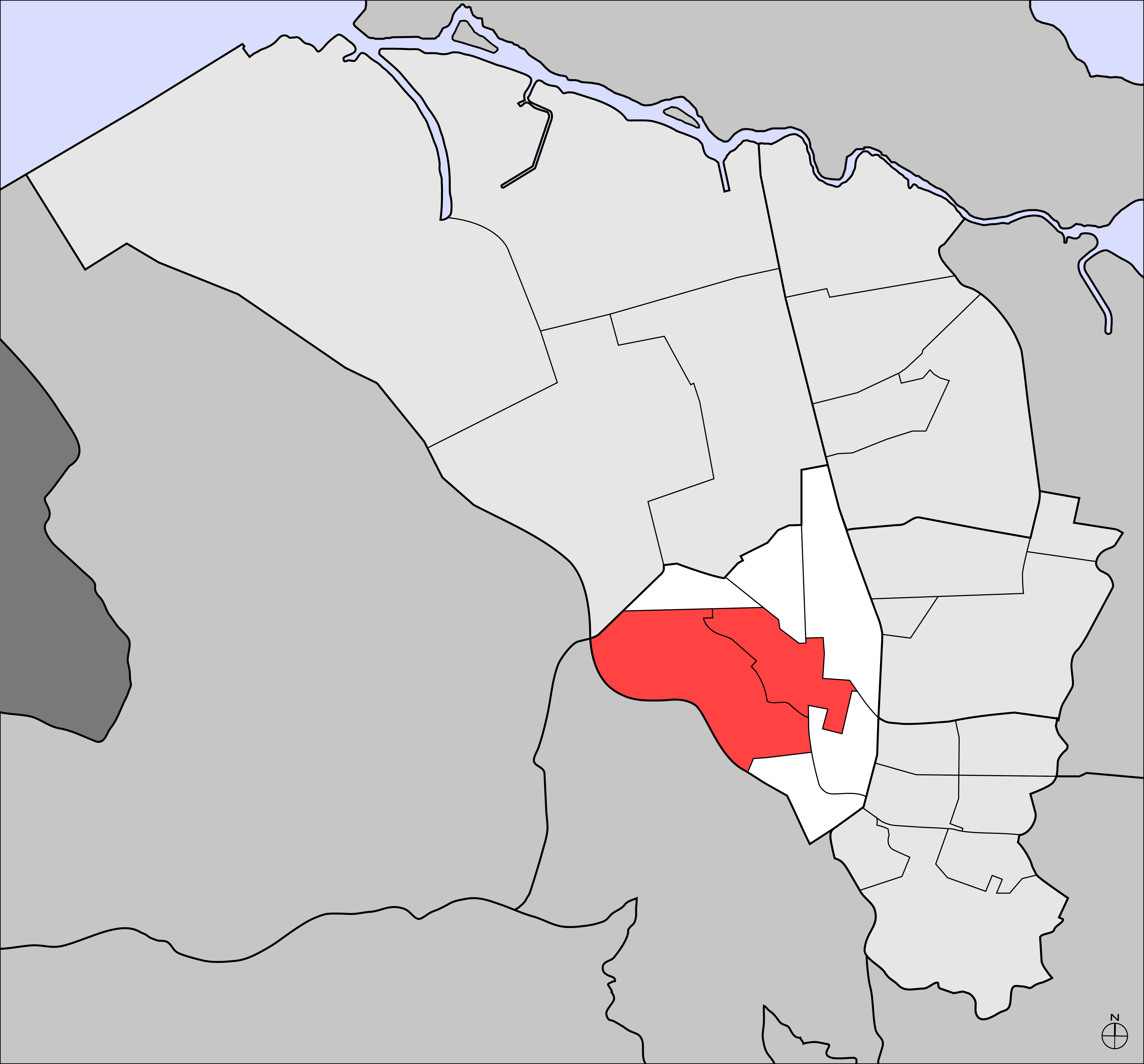
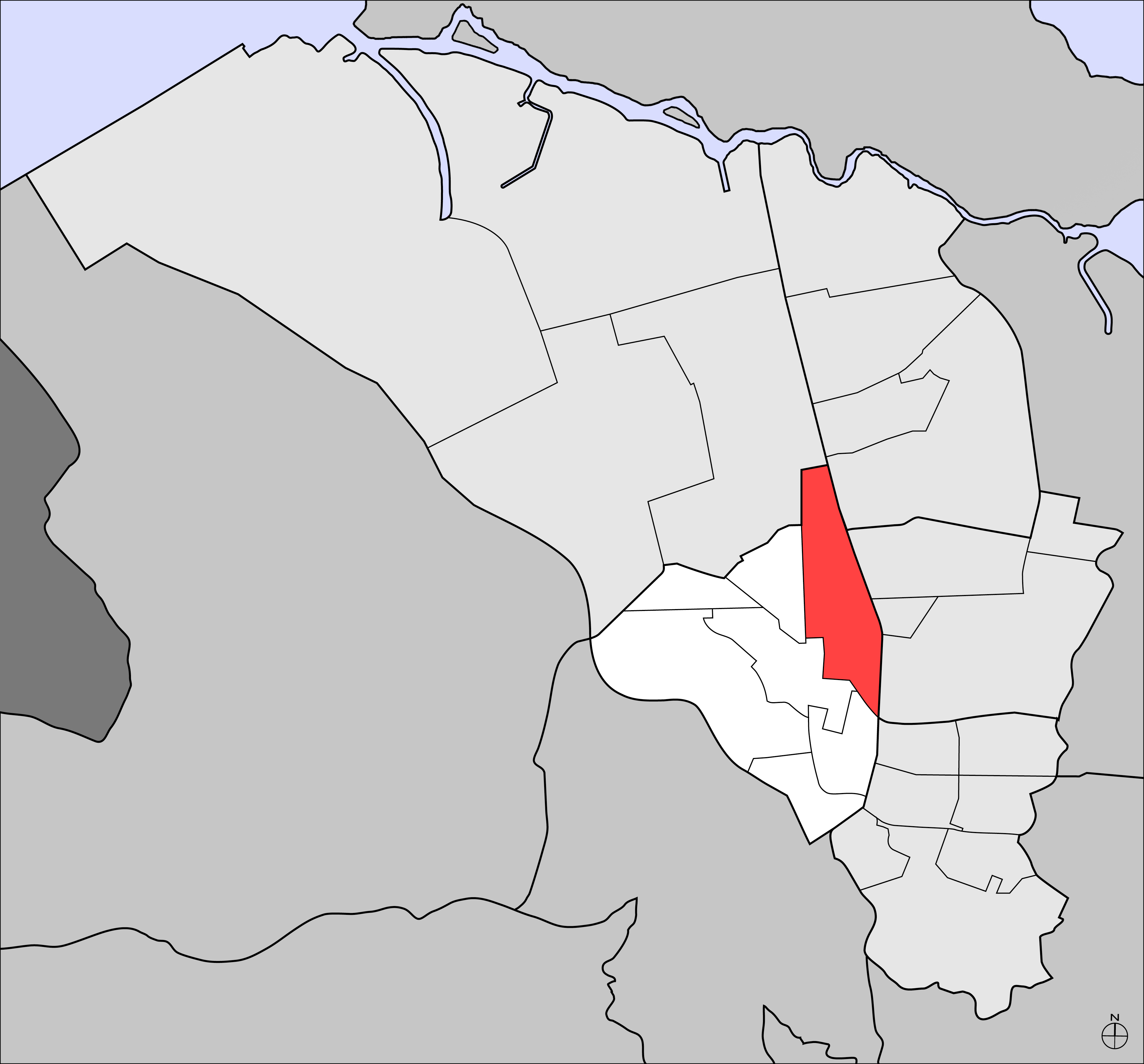
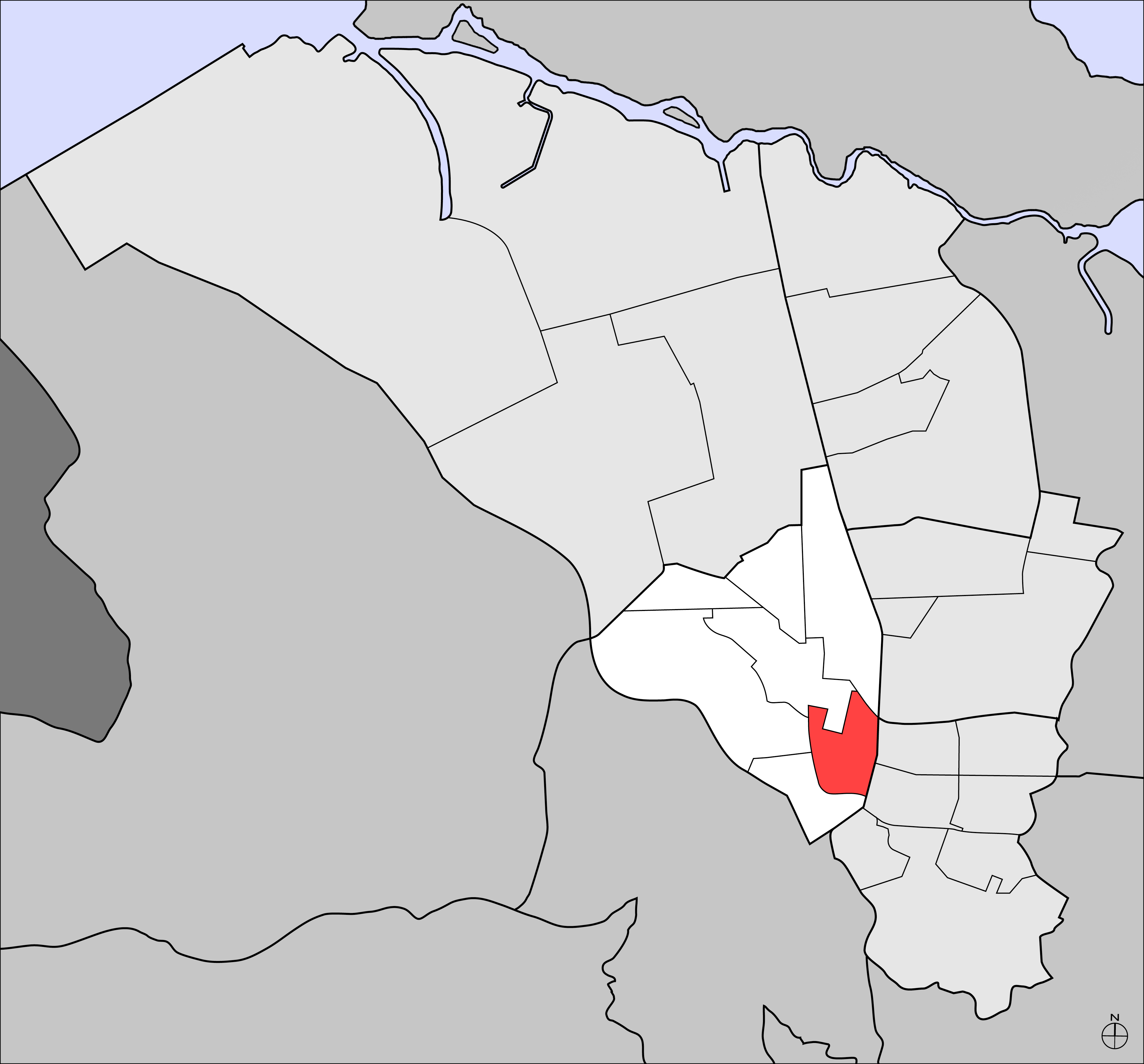
Subbarrios within Hato Rey Sur

=== Monacillo ===
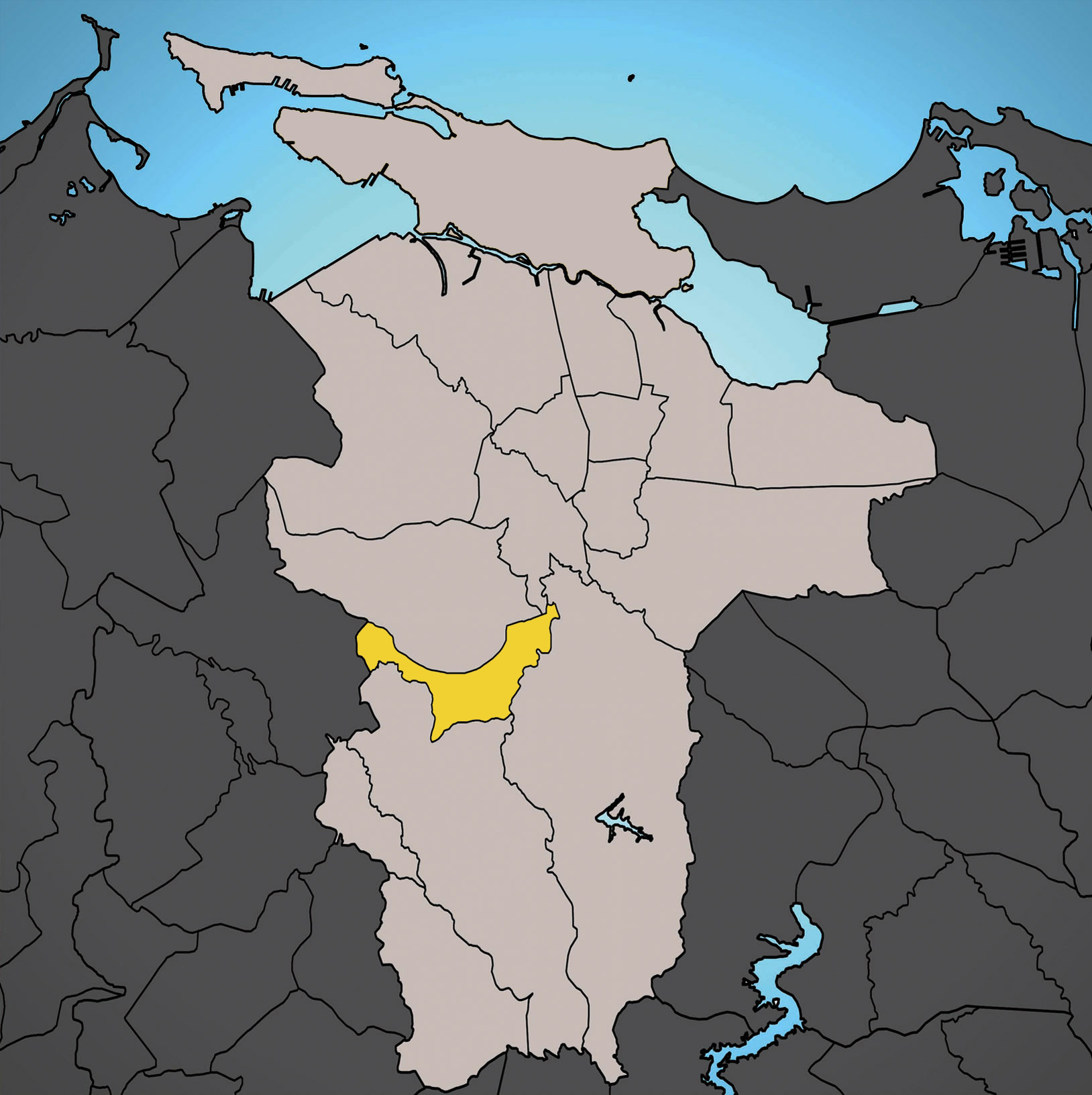
Monacillo within San Juan

=== Monacillo Urbano ===
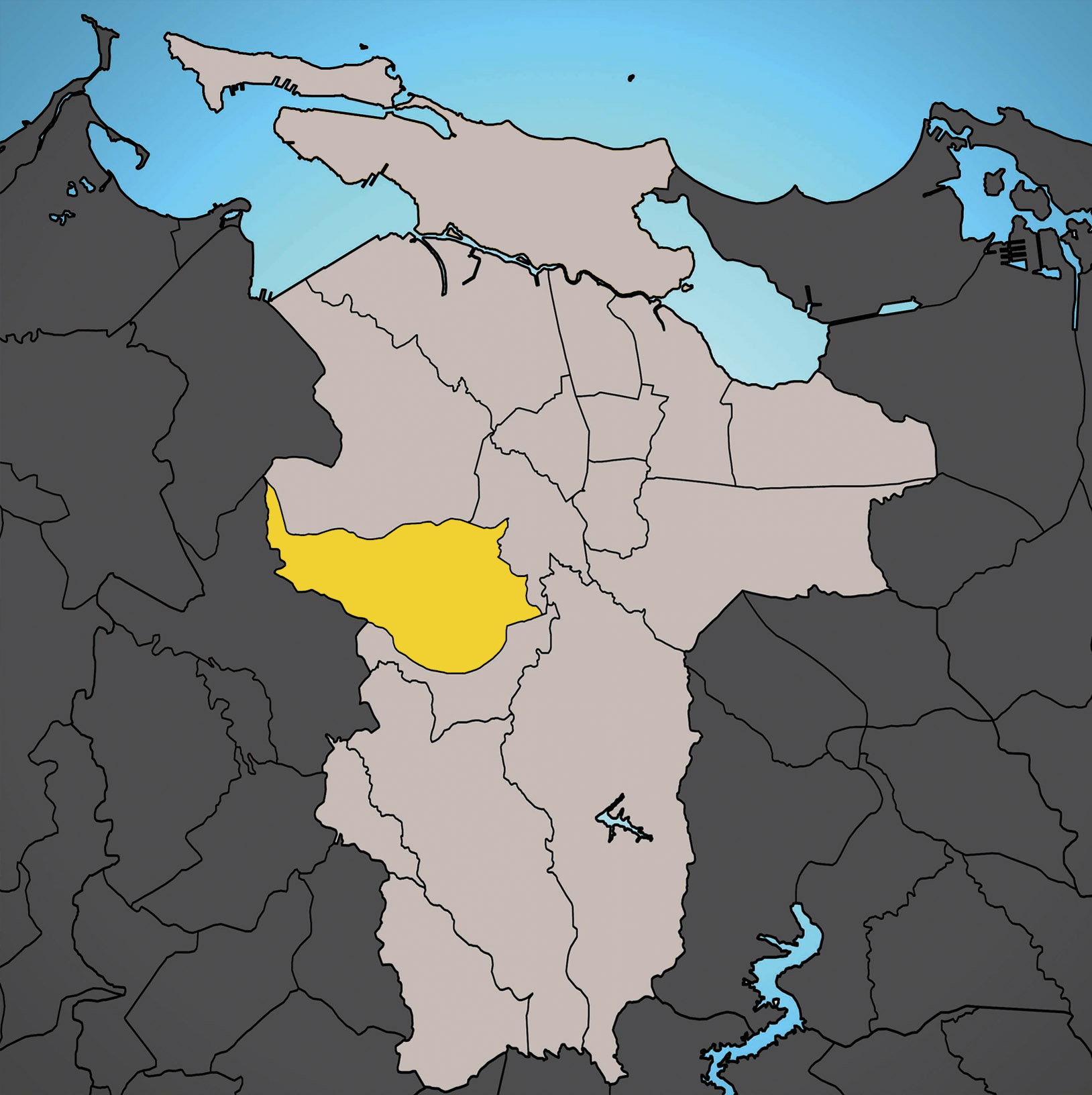
Monacillo Urbano within San Juan

=== Oriente ===
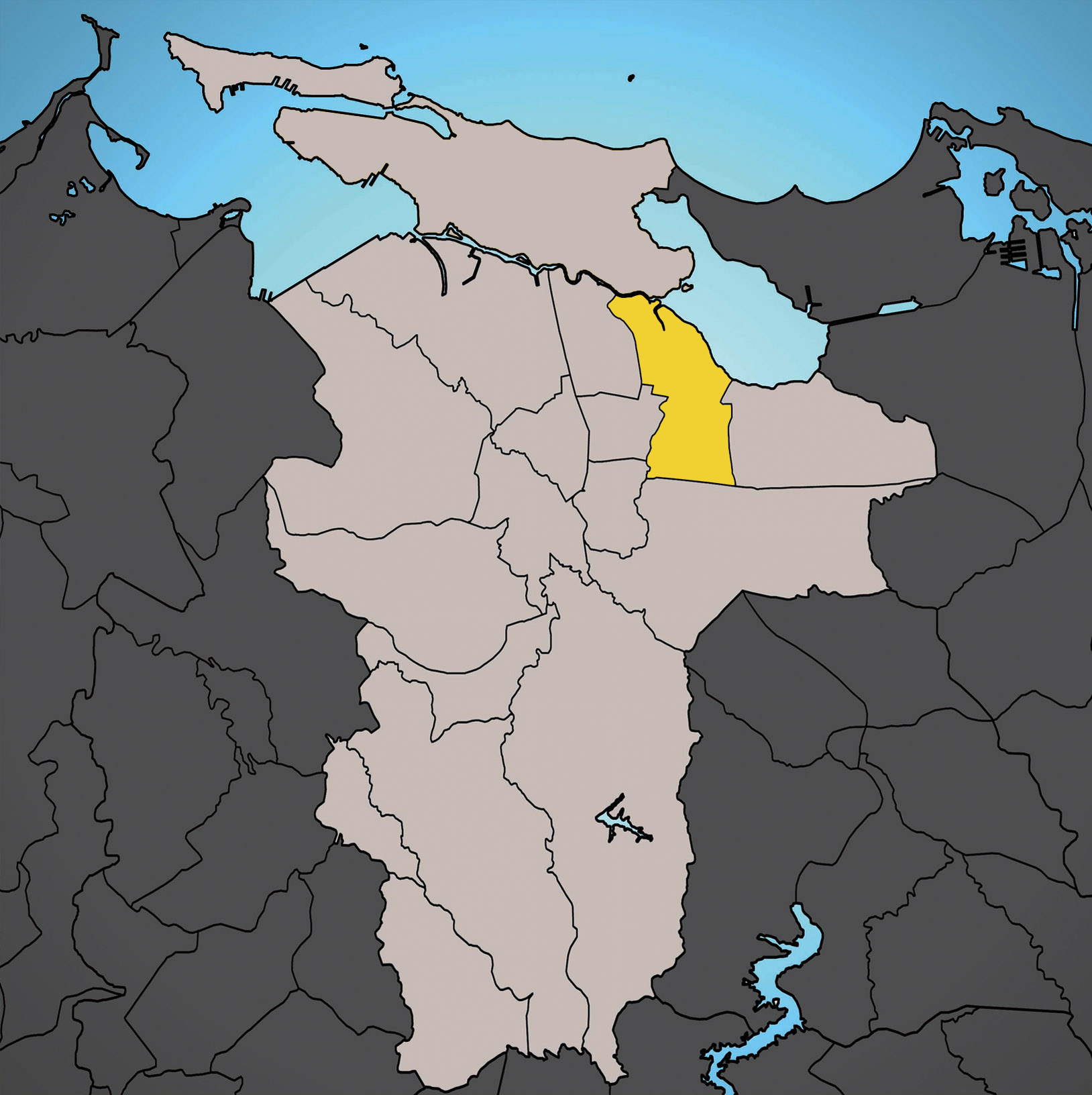
Oriente within San Juan

Oriente is divided into three subbarrios or districts:

- Borinquen
- López Sicardó
- San José

=== Río Piedras Pueblo ===
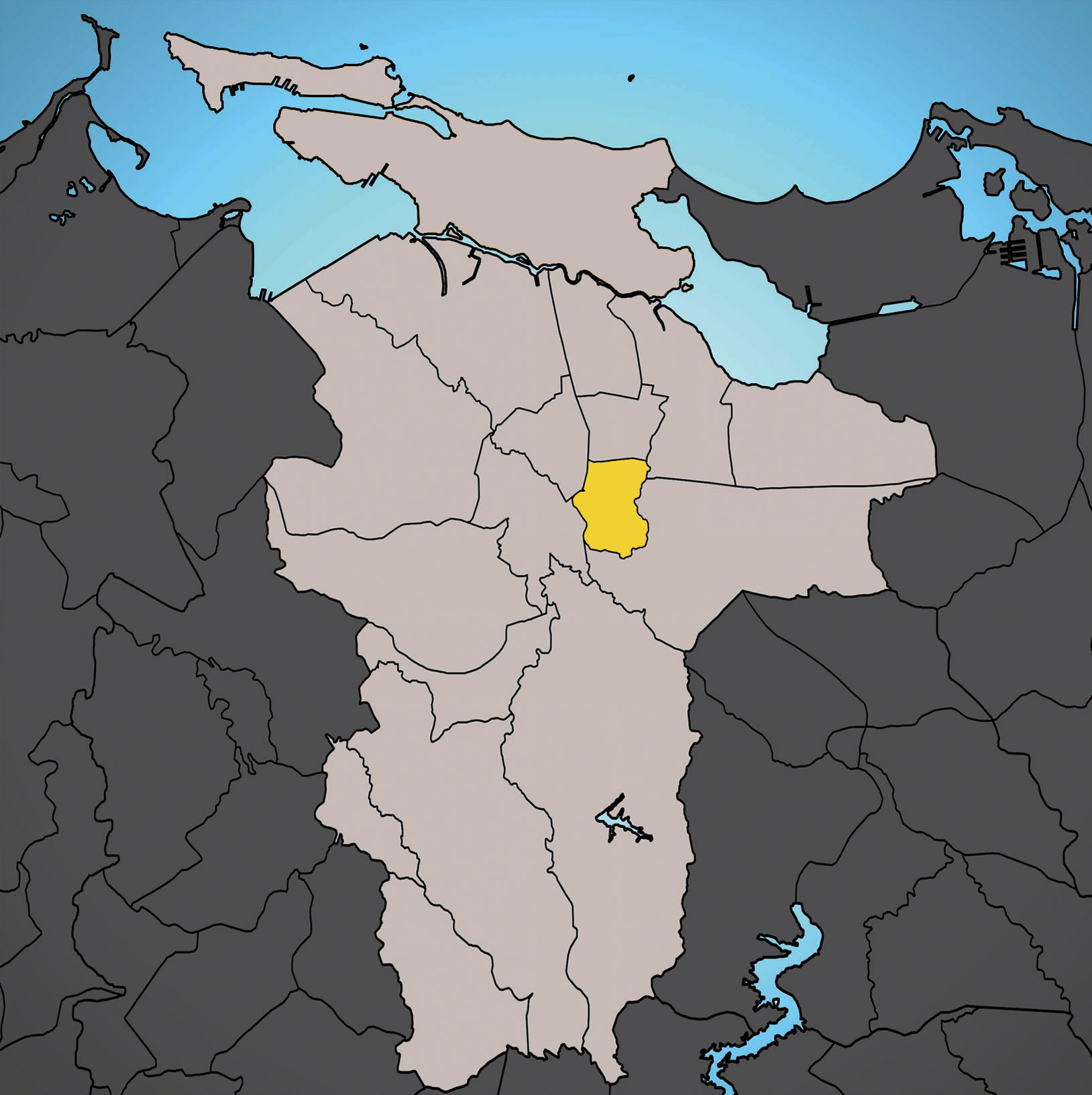
Río Piedras Pueblo within San Juan

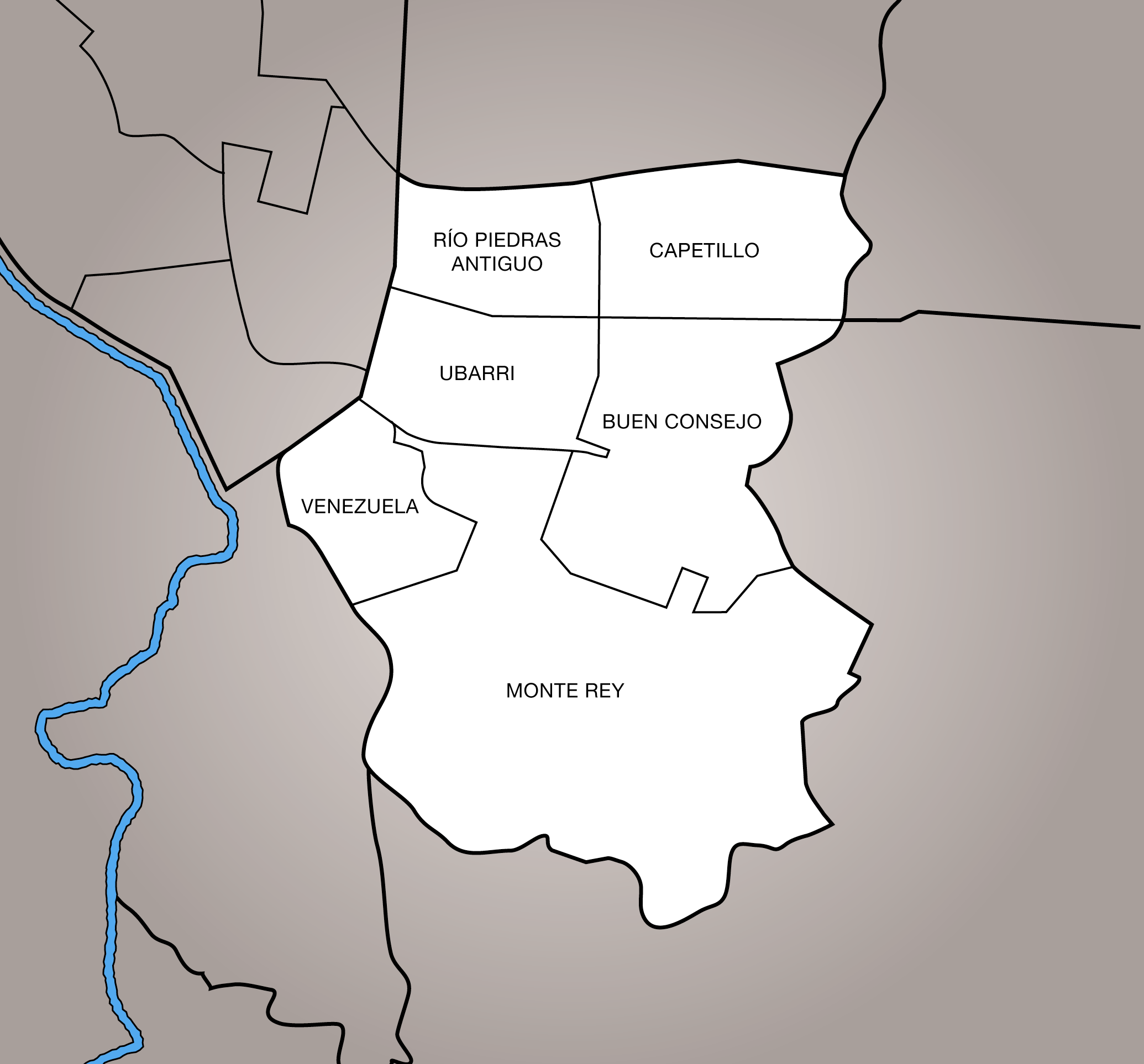
Subbarrios within Río Piedras Pueblo

Río Piedras Pueblo is divided into six subbarrios or districts:

- Buen Consejo
- Capetillo
- Monte Rey
- Río Piedras Antiguo
- Ubarri
- Venezuela

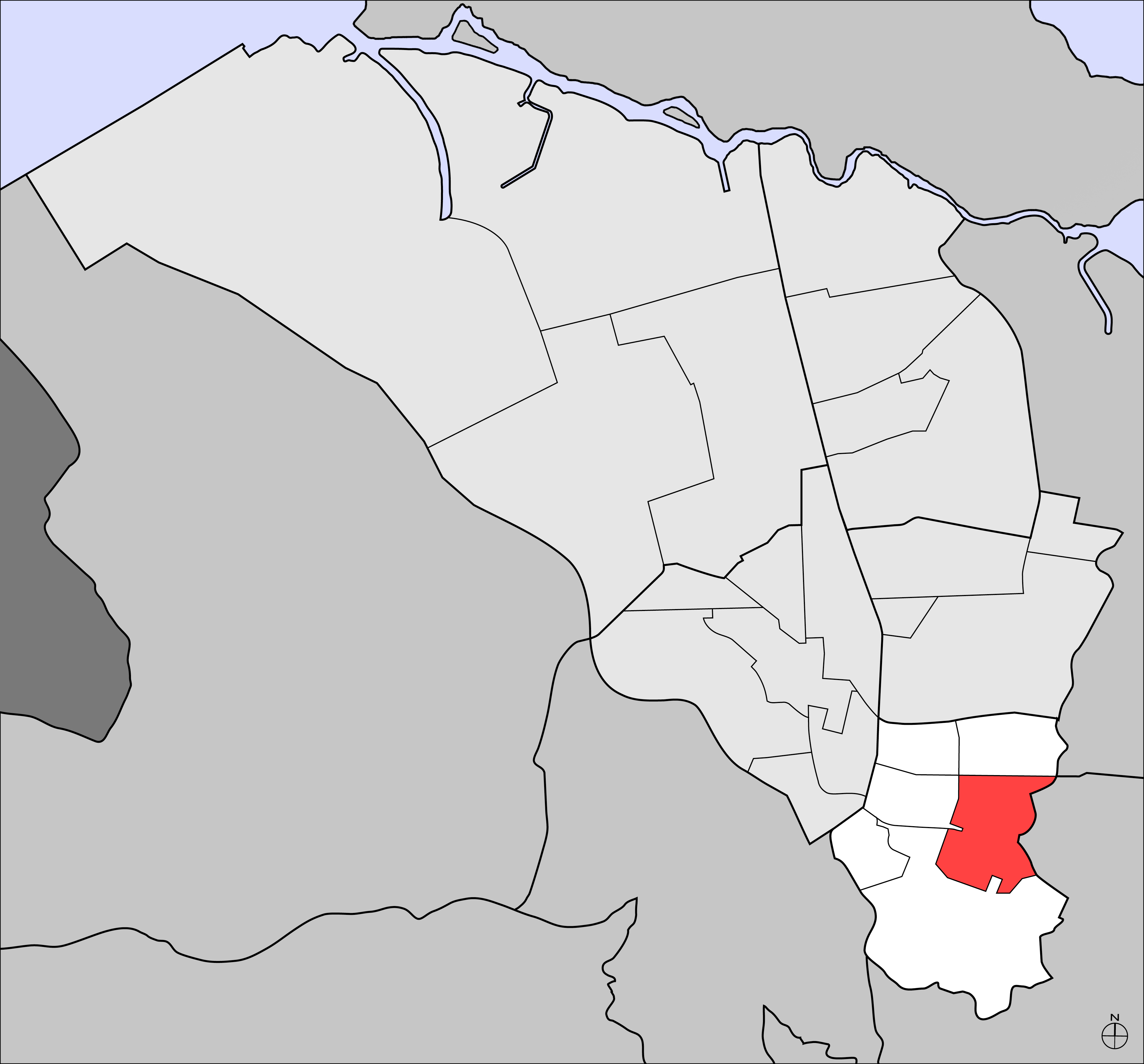
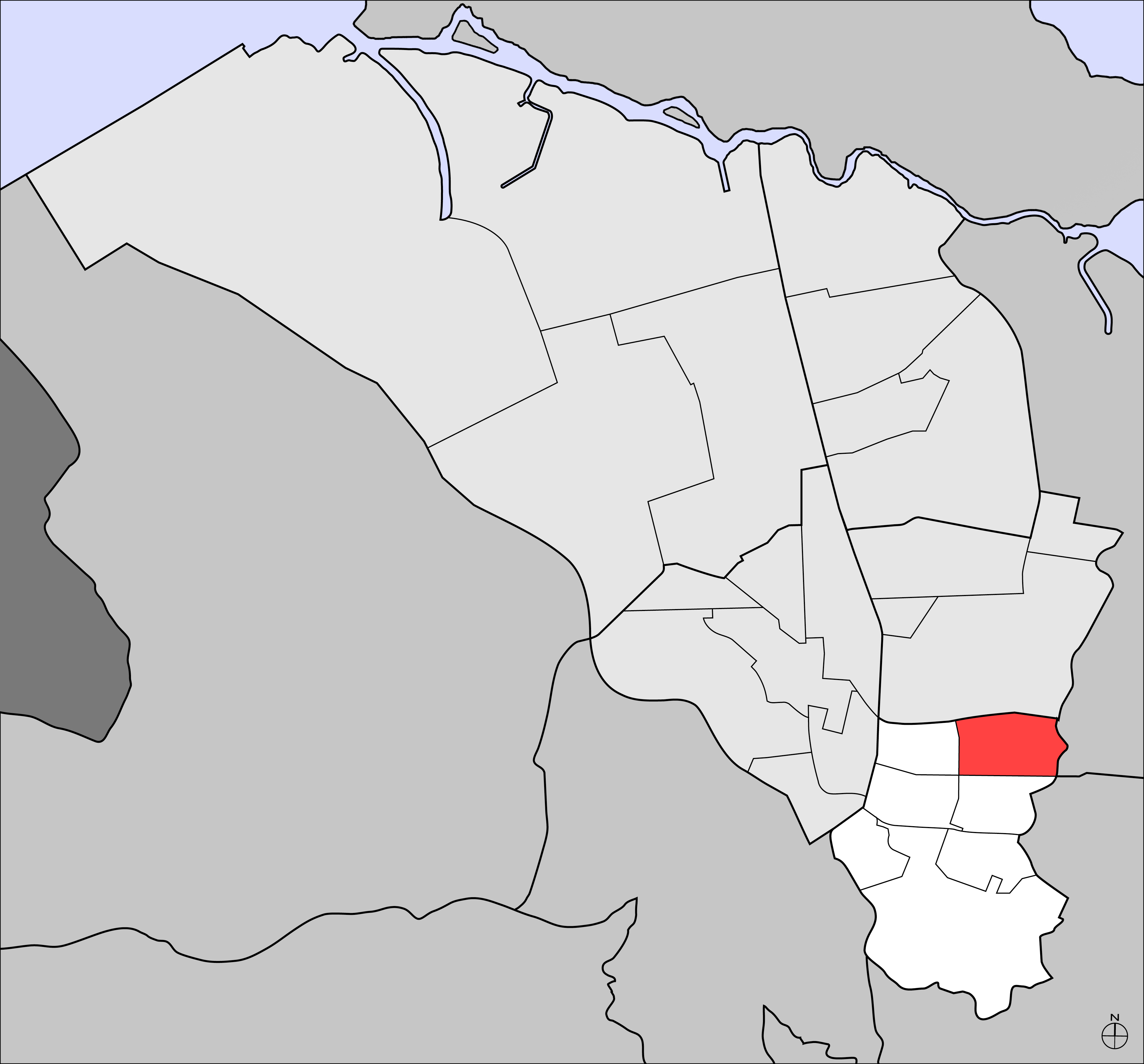
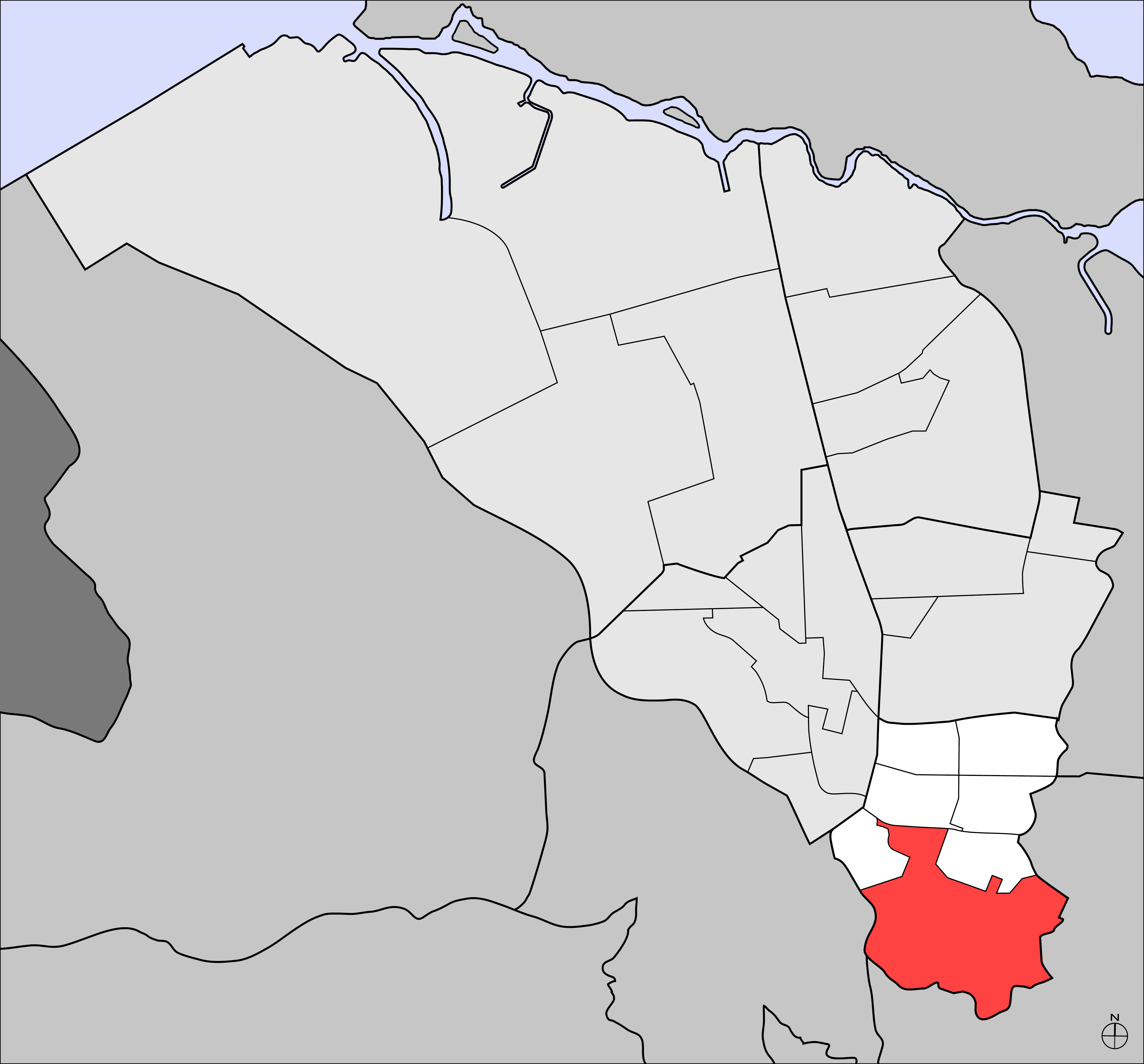
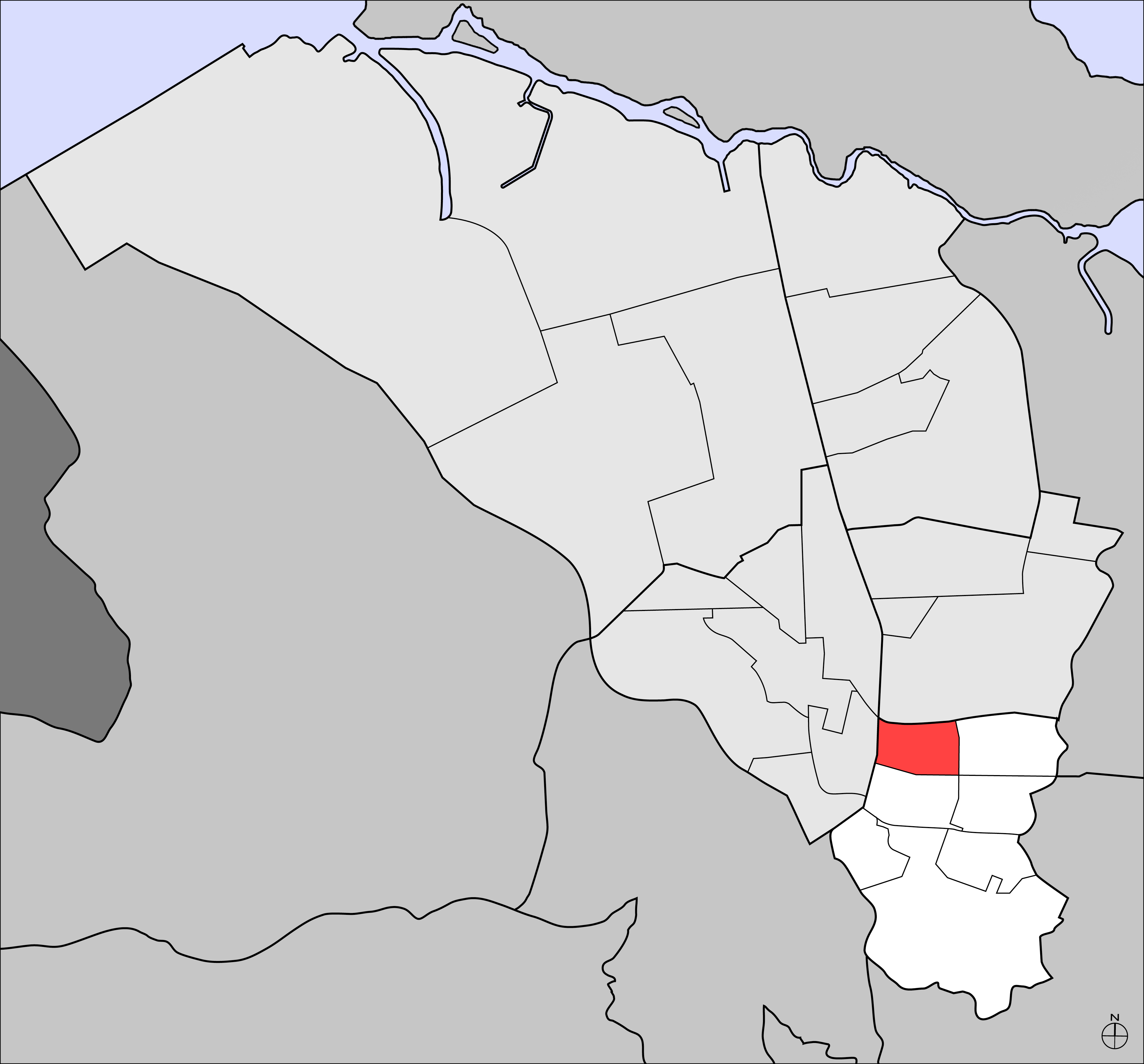
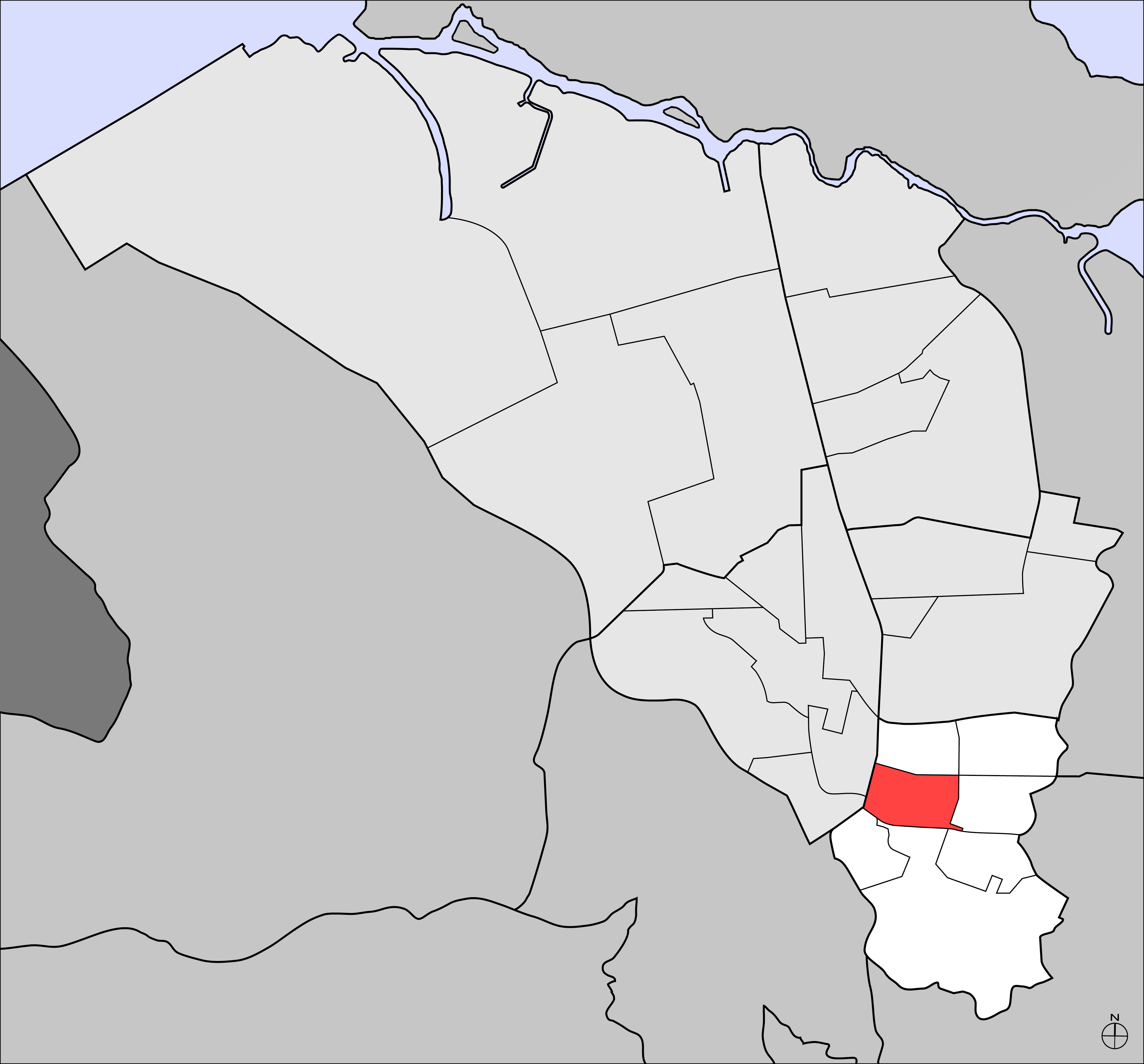
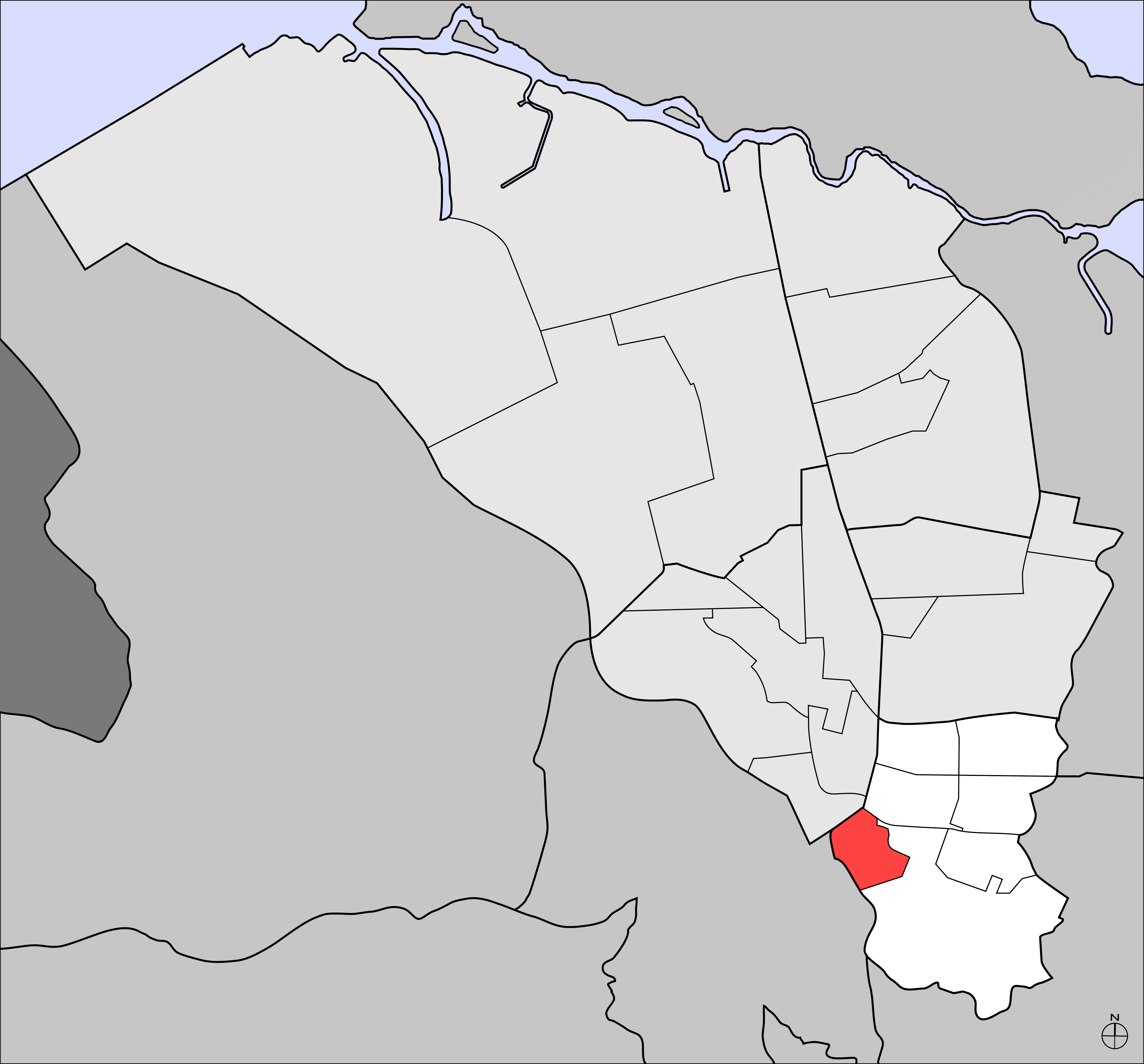
Subbarrios within Río Piedras Pueblo

=== Quebrada Arenas ===
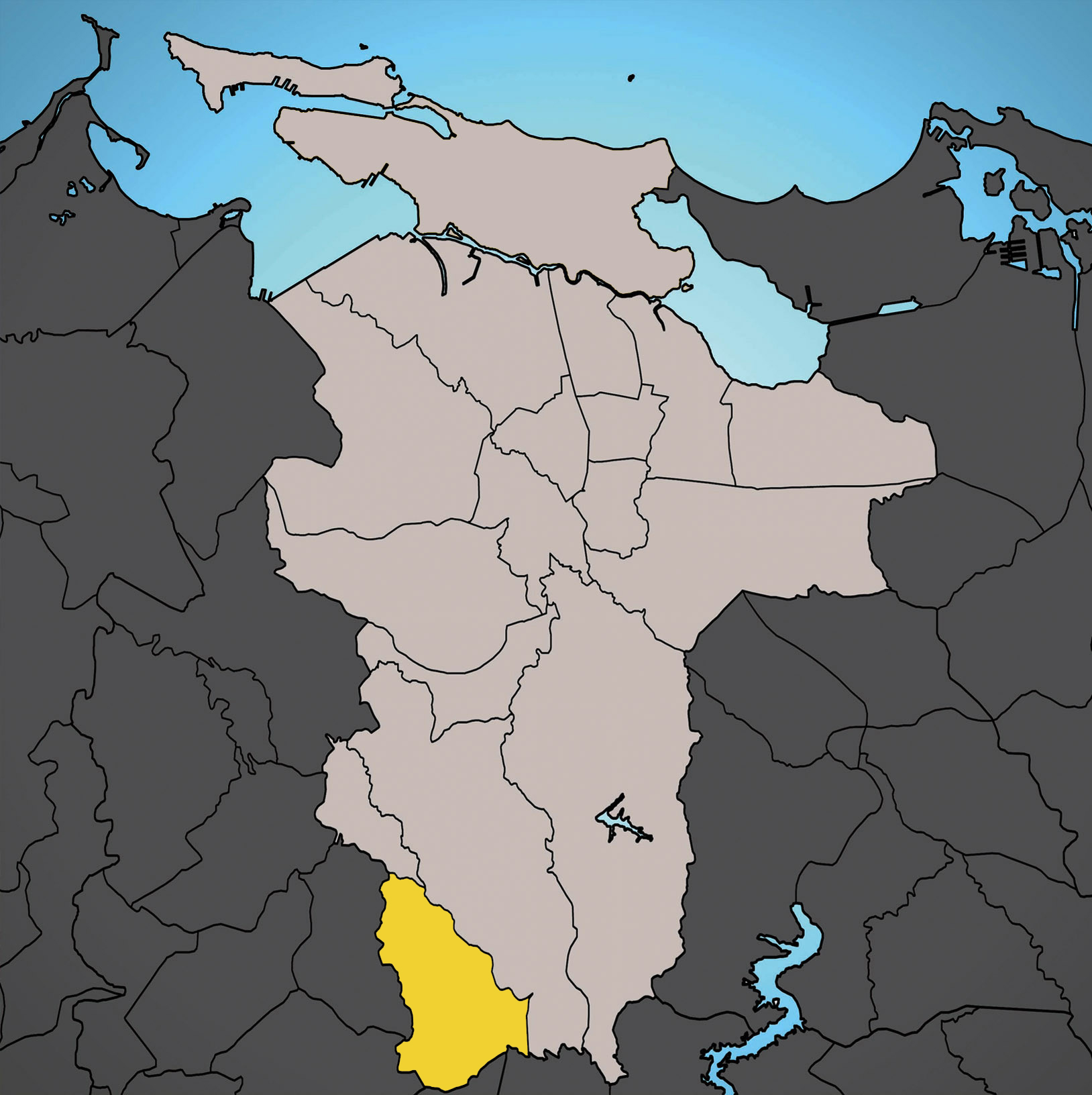
Quebrada Arenas within San Juan

=== Sabana Llana Norte ===
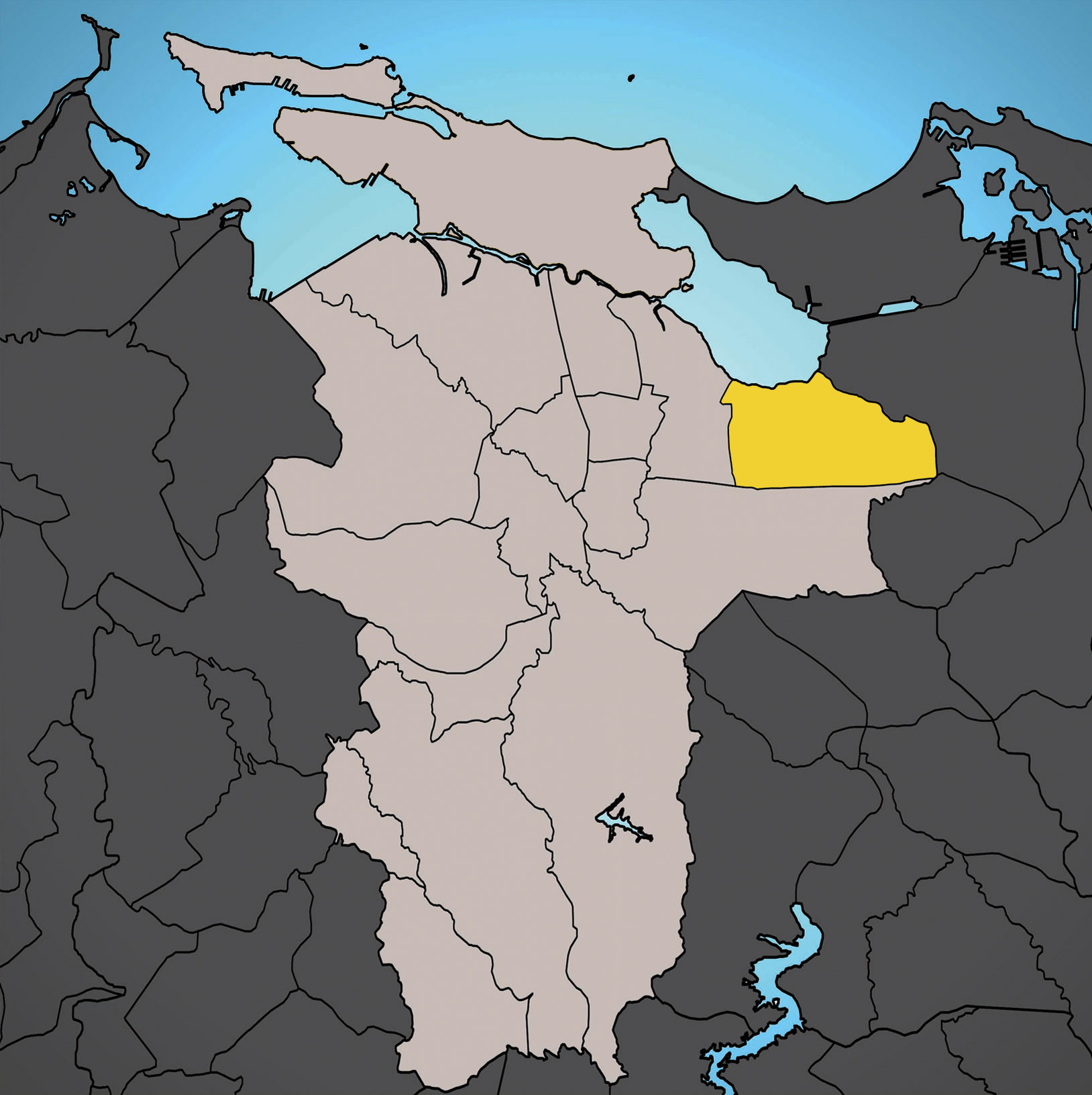
Sabana Llana Norte within San Juan

=== Sabana Llana Sur ===
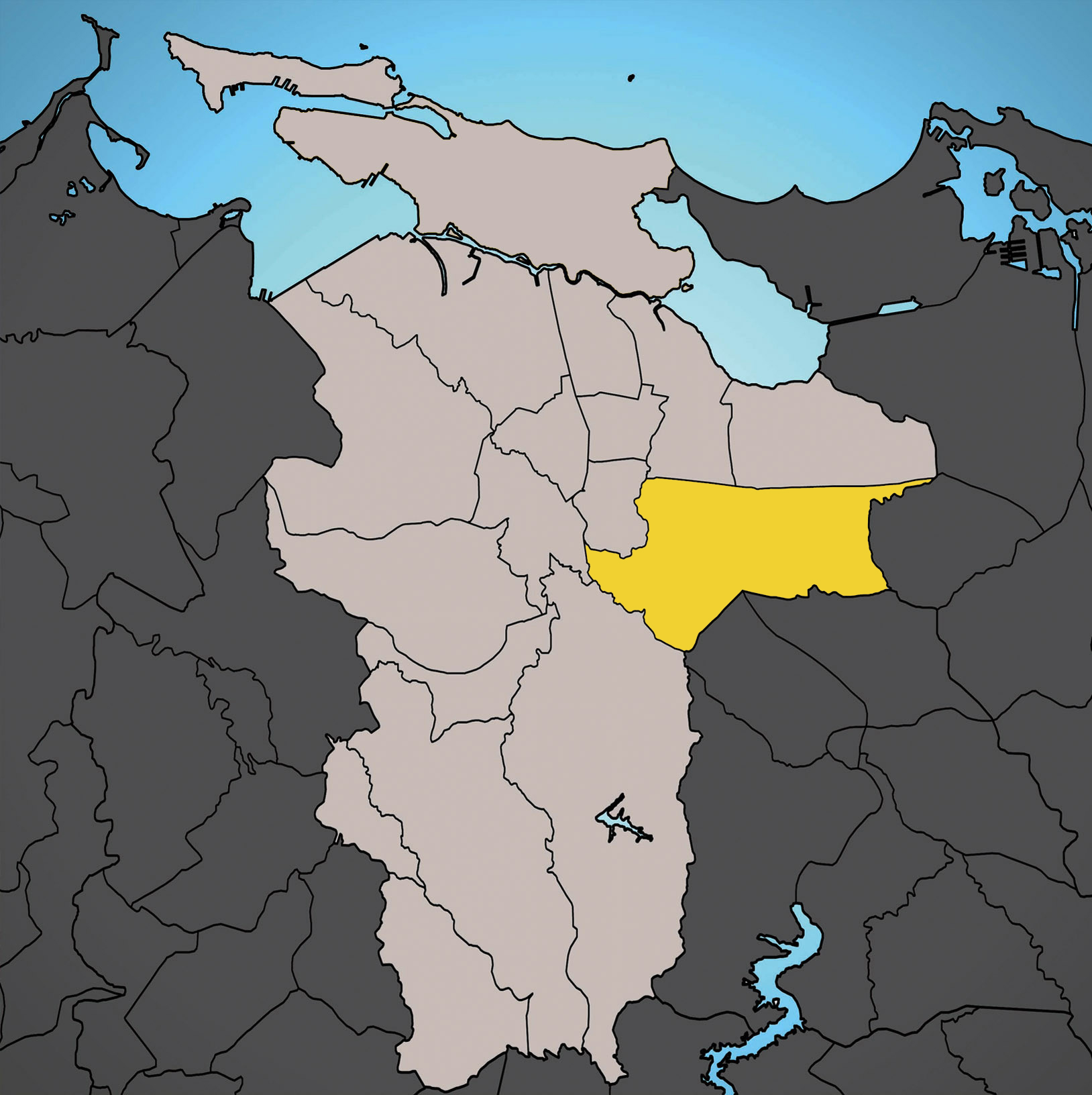
Sabana Llana Sur within San Juan

=== Tortugo ===
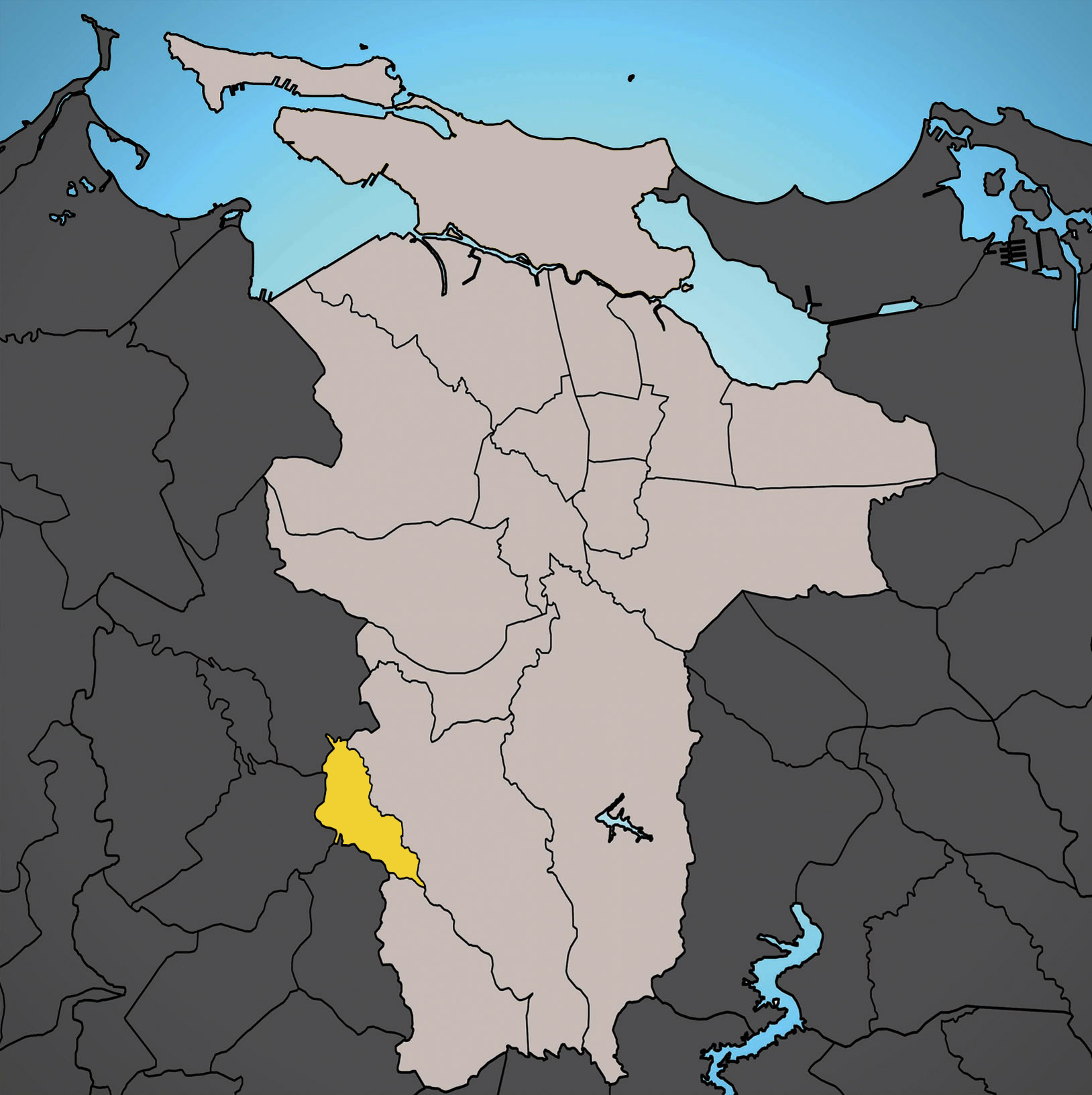
Tortugo within San Juan

=== Universidad ===
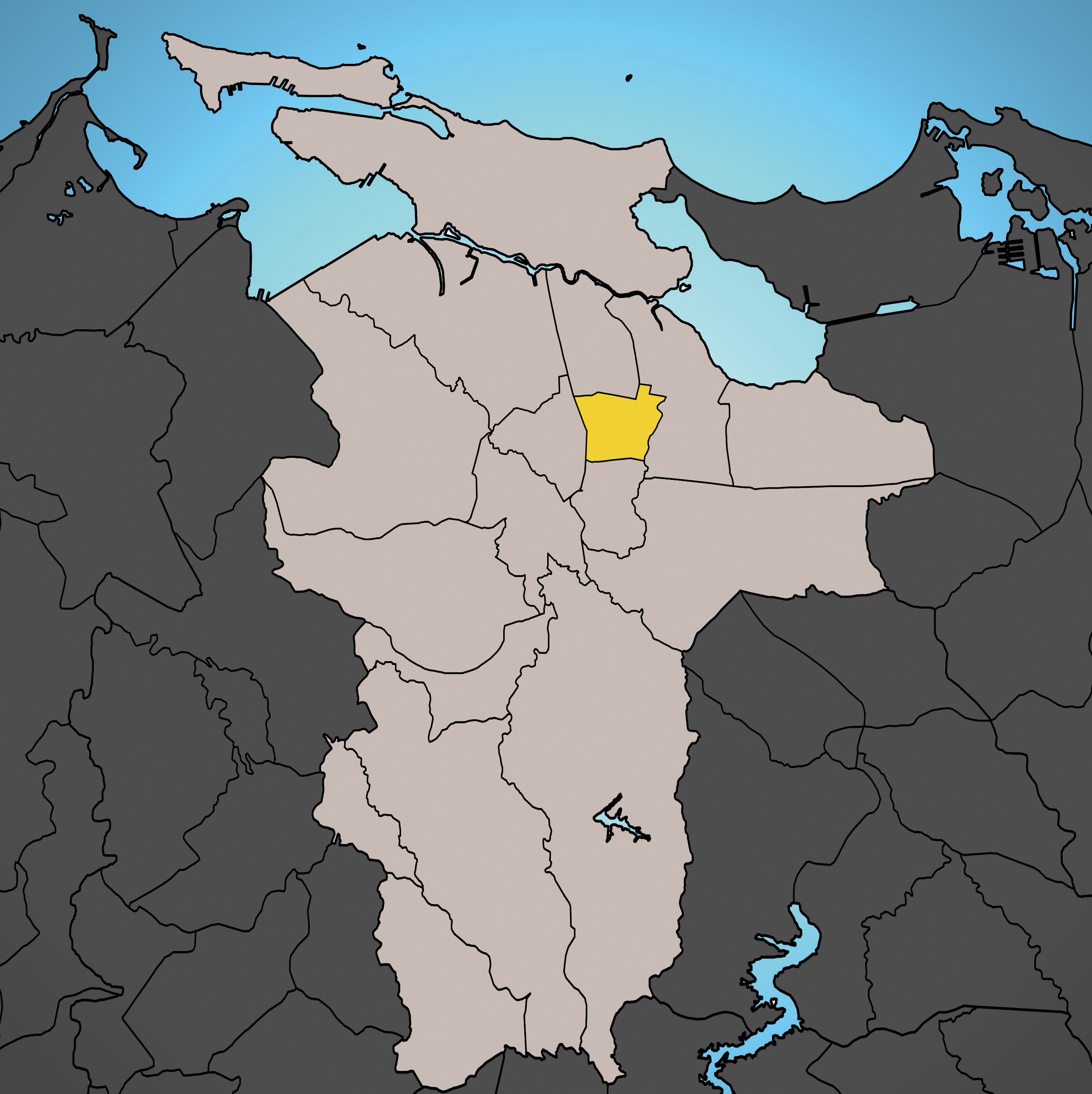
Universidad within San Juan

Universidad is divided in four subbarrios or districts:

- Amparo
- Auxilio Mutuo
- Institución
- Valencia

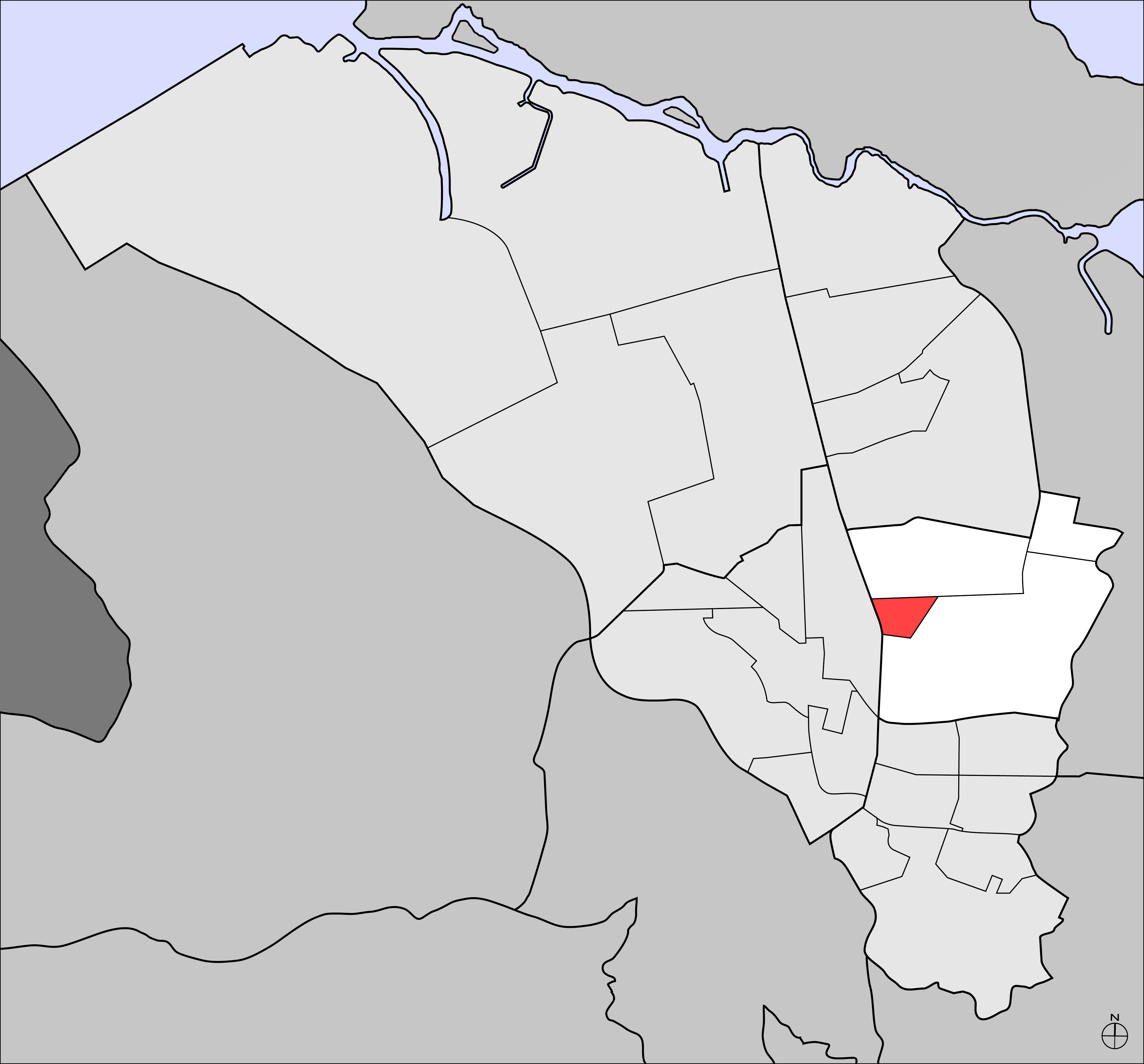
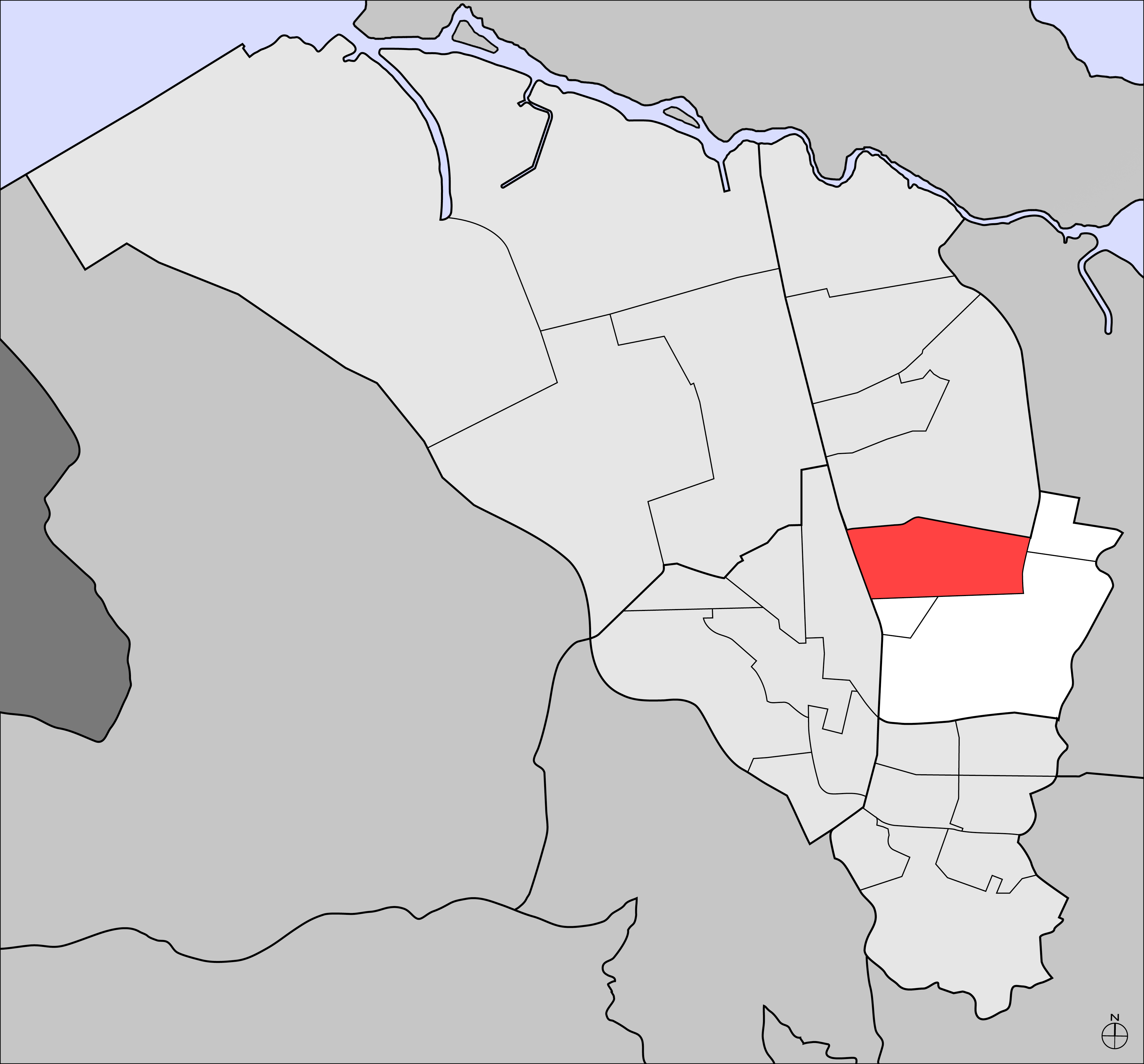
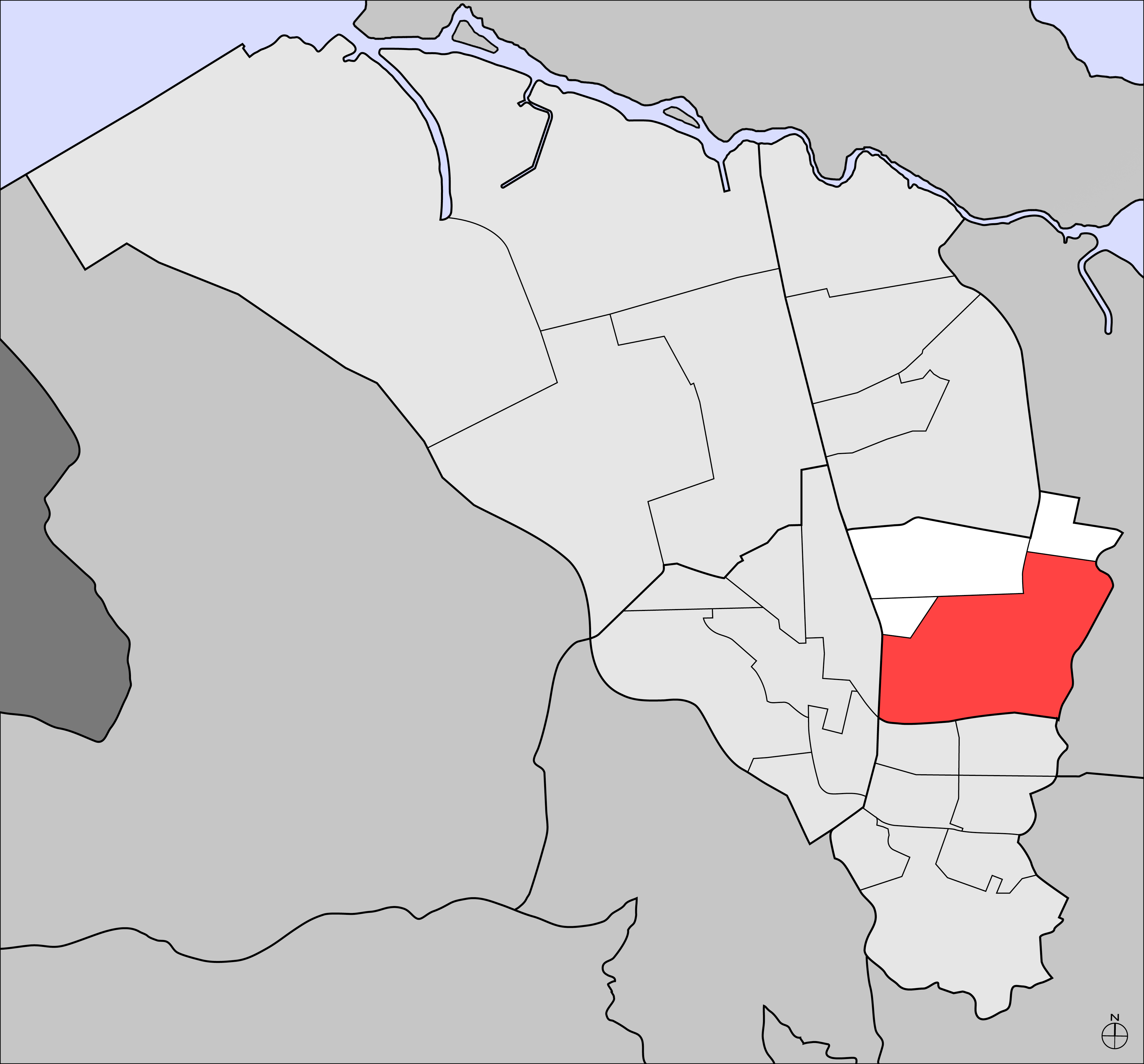
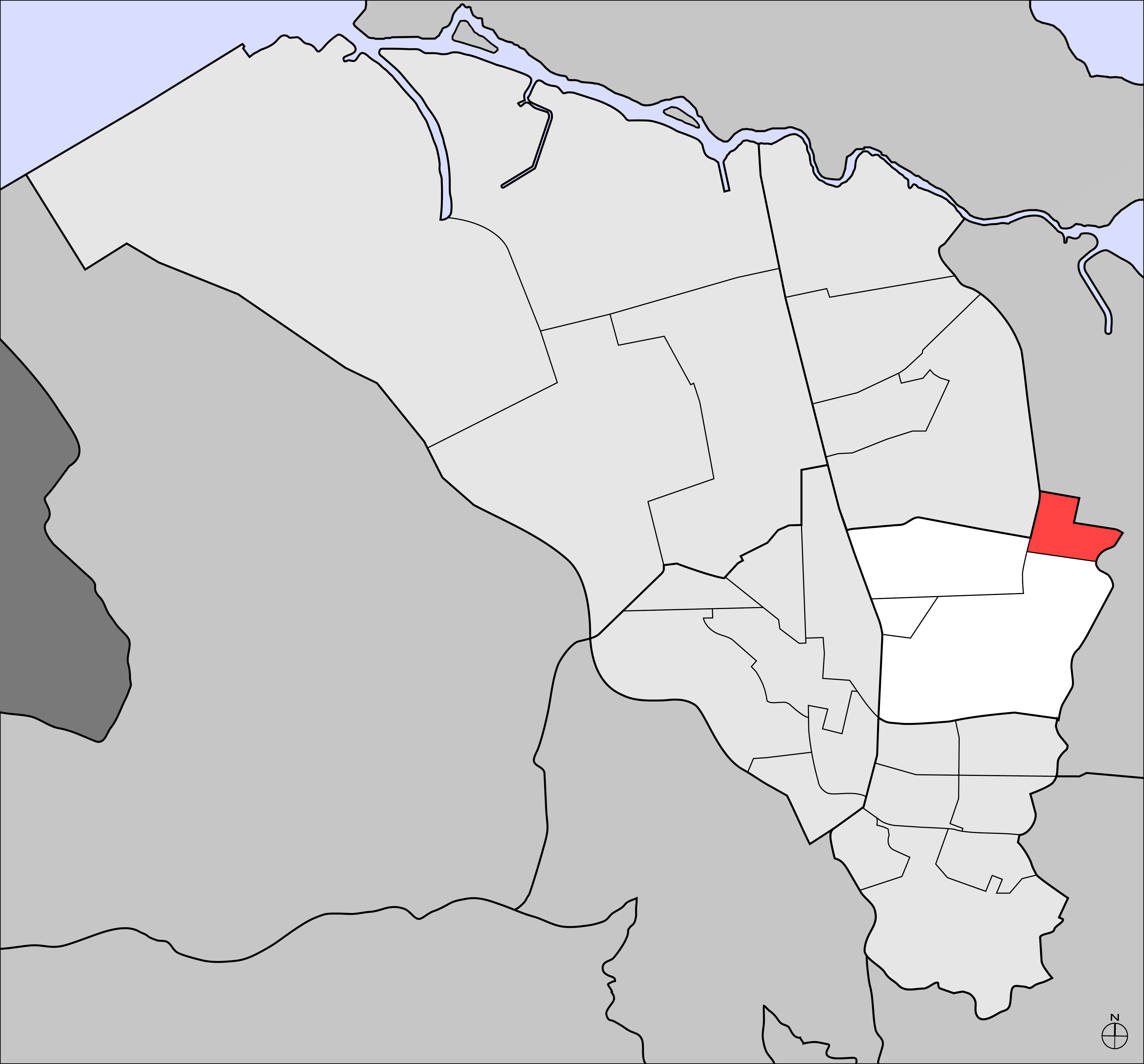
Subbarrios within Universidad

== Collective barrios ==
Three barrios were further divided into other barrios after San Juan annexed Río Piedras in 1951 (they are most commonly known by their collective name):

=== Sabana Llana ===
A former barrio currently divided into the following barrios:

- Sabana Llana Norte
- Sabana Llana Sur

=== Monacillos ===
A former barrio currently divided into the following barrios:

- Monacillo
- Monacillo Urbano

=== Hato Rey ===
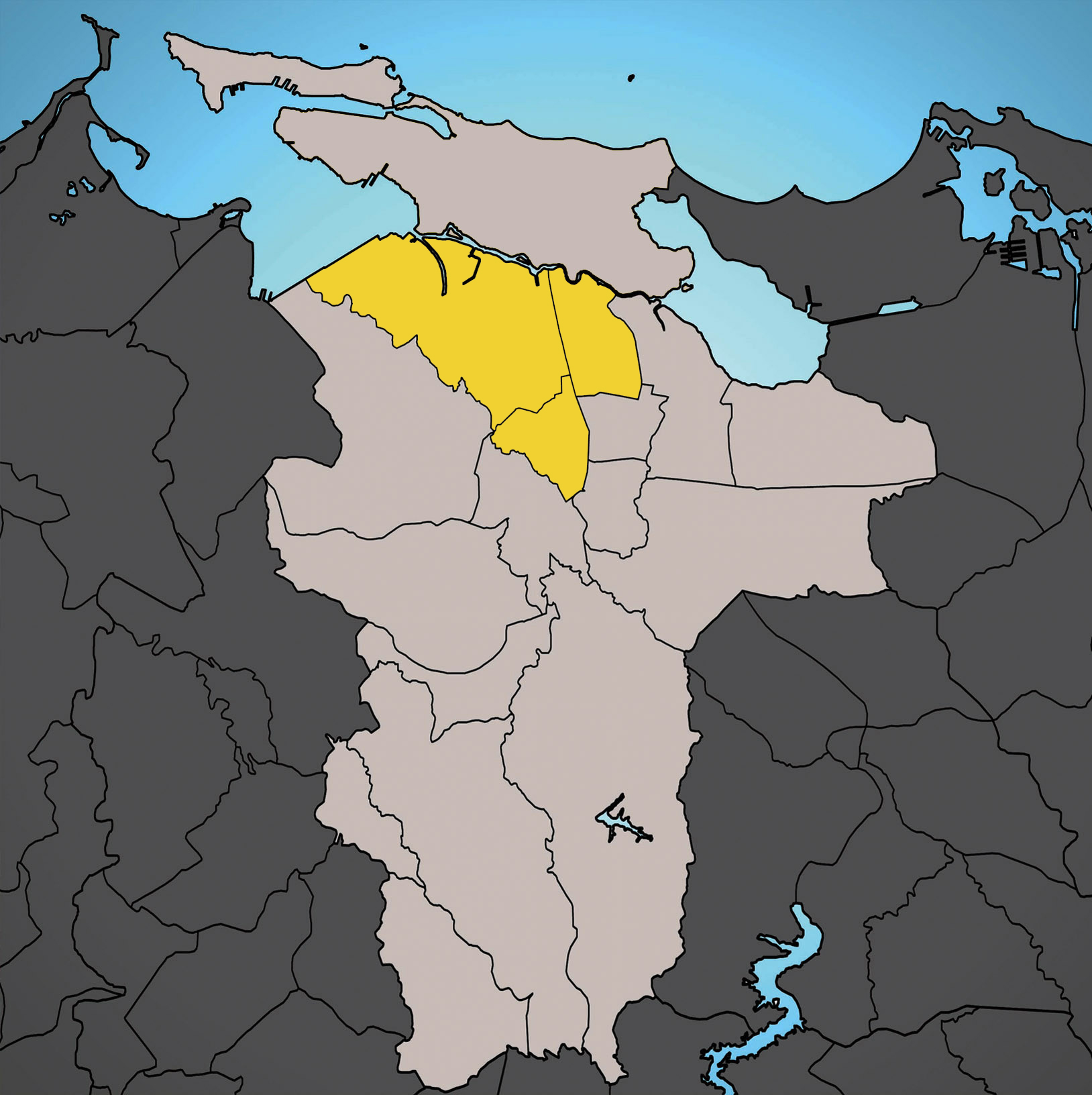
Hato Rey within San Juan (yellow)

A former barrio currently divided into the following barrios:

- Hato Rey Central
- Hato Rey Norte
- Hato Rey Sur

Two barrios were united into one barrio after San Juan annexed Río Piedras in 1951:

=== Cupey ===
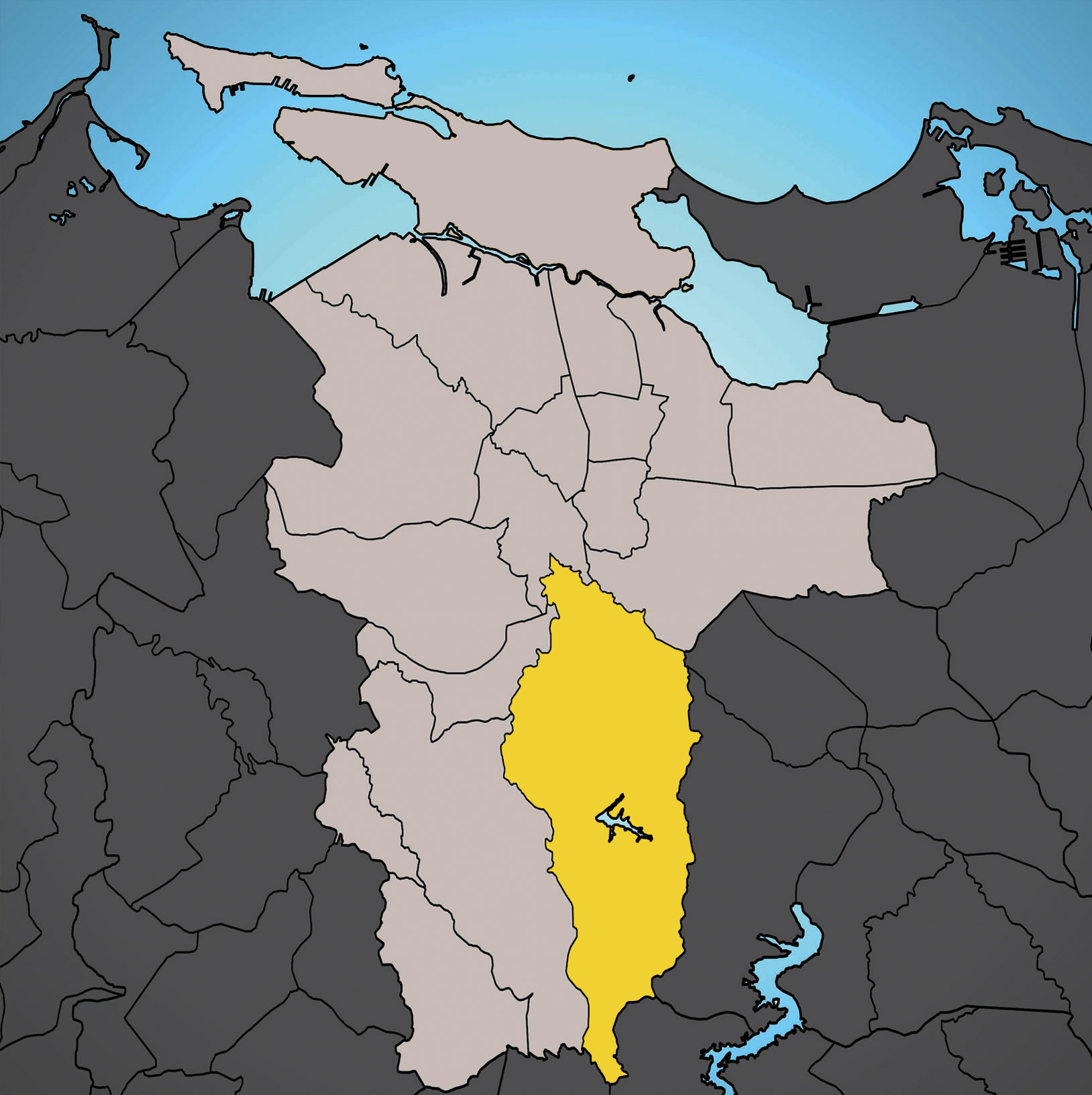
Cupey within San Juan (yellow)

A current barrio formerly divided into the following two barrios:

- Cupey Alto
- Cupey Bajo

== See also ==
- Barrios of Puerto Rico
- List of barrios and sectors of San Juan, Puerto Rico
- List of communities in Puerto Rico
- Old San Juan
- Municipalities of Puerto Rico
