= List of barrios and sectors of San Juan, Puerto Rico =

Like each of the 78 Municipalities of Puerto Rico, the capital of Puerto Rico, San Juan, Puerto Rico, is subdivided into barrios or in English wards, 18 in number, 8 of which are further subdivided into a total of 72 sub-barrios. On the lowest level of territorial subdivision, the barrios of San Juan are subdivided into a total of more than 2000 sectors:

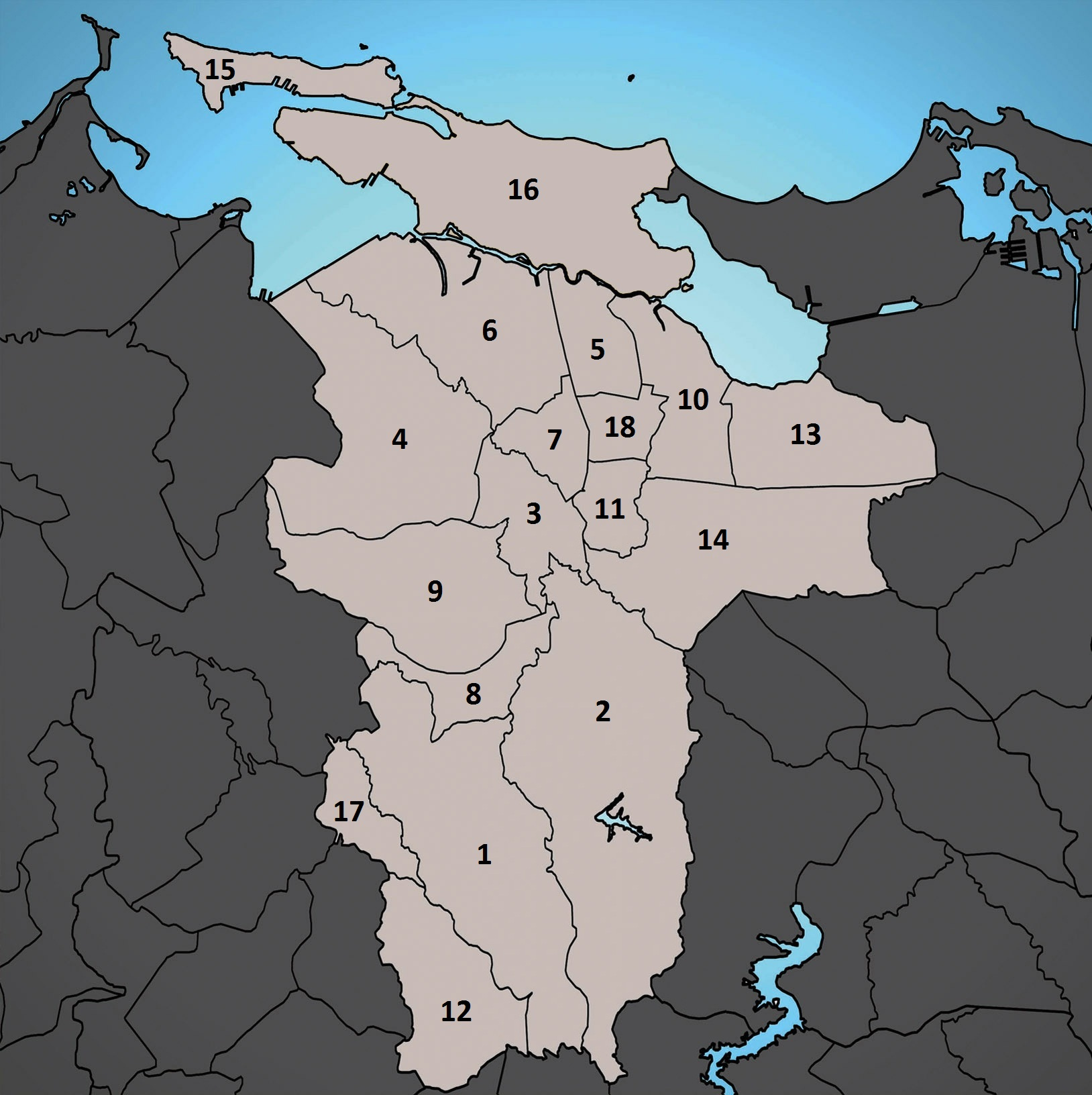
Barrios and Sub-Barrios of San Juan

== Number of sectors by barrio ==
1. Caimito (128 sectors)
2. Cupey (209 sectors)
3. El Cinco (18 sectors)
4. Gobernador Piñero (64 sectors)
5. Hato Rey Central (4 sub-barrios, 63 sectors)
6. Hato Rey Norte (4 sub-barrios, 47 sectors)
7. Hato Rey Sur (4 sub-barrios, 62 sectors)
8. Monacillo (44 sectors)
9. Monacillo Urbano (90 sectors)
10. Oriente (3 sub-barrios, 100 sectors)
11. Pueblo (6 sub-barrios, 22 sectors)
12. Quebrada Arenas (35 sectors)
13. Sabana Llana Norte (105 sectors)
14. Sabana Llana Sur (83 sectors)
15. San Juan Antiguo (7 sub-barrios, 68 sectors)
16. Santurce (40 sub-barrios, 840 sectors)
17. Tortugo (24 sectors)
18. Universidad (4 sub-barrios, 6 sectors)

== List of sub-barrios by barrio ==
1. Caimito
2. Cupey (formerly two barrios: Cupey Alto and Cupey Bajo)
3. El Cinco
4. Gobernador Piñero
5. Hato Rey Central
  1. Ciudad Nueva
  2. Floral Park
  3. Las Monjas
  4. Quintana
6. Hato Rey Norte
  1. El Vedado
  2. Eleanor Roosevelt
  3. Martín Peña
  4. Puerto Nuevo
7. Hato Rey Sur
  1. Bella Vista
  2. Hyde Park
  3. La 37
  4. Santa Rita
8. Monacillo
9. Monacillo Urbano
10. Oriente
  1. Borínquen
  2. López Sicardó
  3. San José
11. Río Piedras Pueblo
  1. Buen Consejo
  2. Capetillo
  3. Monte Rey
  4. Río Piedras Antiguo
  5. Ubarri
  6. Venezuela
12. Quebrada Arenas
13. Sabana Llana Norte
14. Sabana Llana Sur
15. Tortugo
16. Universidad
  1. Amparo
  2. Auxilio Mutuo
  3. Institución
  4. Valencia
17. San Juan Antiguo
  1. Ballajá
  2. Catedral
  3. Marina
  4. Mercado
  5. Puerta de Tierra
  6. San Cristóbal
  7. San Francisco
18. Santurce
  1. Alto del Cabro
  2. Bayola
  3. Bolívar
  4. Buenos Aires
  5. Campo Alegre
  6. Chícharo
  7. Condadito
  8. Condado
  9. Figueroa
  10. Gandul
  11. Herrera
  12. Hipódromo
  13. Hoare
  14. Isla Grande
  15. Las Casas
  16. Las Marías
  17. Las Palmas
  18. La Zona
  19. Loíza
  20. Machuchal
  21. María Mozcó
  22. Marruecos
  23. Martín Peña
  24. Melilla
  25. Merhoff
  26. Minillas
  27. Miramar
  28. Monteflores
  29. Obrero
  30. Ocean Park
  31. Parque
  32. Pozo del Hato
  33. Pulguero
  34. Sagrado Corazón
  35. San Juan Moderno
  36. San Mateo
  37. Seboruco
  38. Shanghai
  39. Tras Talleres
  40. Villa Palmeras

== List of sectors by barrio ==
On the lowest level of territorial subdivision, each barrio is subdivided into sectors:

=== Abbreviations ===
Apt.	Apartments
Apto.	Apartamentos
Apts.	Apartments
Ave.	Avenida
Bo.	Barrio
Camn.	Camino
Carr.	Carretera
Cond.	Condominio
Egda.	Egida
Ext.	Extensión
Hog.	Hogar
Parc.	Parcelas
Rcia.	Residencia
Res.	Residencial
Sect.	Sector
Urb.	Urbanización

=== Caimito ===
1. Apt. Villas del Señorial
2. Barriada Corea
3. Camn. Caldas
4. Camn. Domingo Peña
5. Camn. Fidalgo Díaz
6. Camn. Los Benítez
7. Camn. Los Noa
8. Camn. Los Sánchez
9. Camn. Los Velázquez
10. Camn. Villegas
11. Camn. Chiclanas I y II
12. Camn. Concepción
13. Camn. Contreras I
14. Camn. Contreras II
15. Camn. De La Paz
16. Camn. Doña Lourdes (antes Camn. Gallera Las Américas)
17. Camn. Dr. Colorado
18. Camn. Efraín Dones
19. Camn. El Bate
20. Camn. El Llano
21. Camn. El Piloto
22. Camn. Estebanía Bravo
23. Camn. Félix Vázquez
24. Camn. Fidalgo Díaz
25. Camn. Francisco Escribano
26. Camn. Genaro Bigio
27. Camn. Guango De Jesús
28. Camn. Guille Figueroa
29. Camn. Guzmán
30. Camn. Iglesia
31. Camn. Juana Díaz
32. Camn. Lázaro
33. Camn. Los Benítez
34. Camn. Los Benítez I y II
35. Camn. Los Bigios
36. Camn. Los Cátala I y II
37. Camn. Los Cotto
38. Camn. Los Cotto (antes Los Café)
39. Camn. Los Figueroa
40. Camn. Los Figueroa
41. Camn. Los García
42. Camn. Los Mota
43. Camn. Los Olmos
44. Camn. Los Ortega
45. Camn. Los Pérez
46. Camn. Los Ramos
47. Camn. Los Ramos
48. Camn. Los Reyes
49. Camn. Los Romero
50. Camn. Los Romero
51. Camn. Los Sánchez
52. Camn. Los Serrano
53. Camn. Luciano Vázquez
54. Camn. Macicela
55. Camn. María Miranda
56. Camn. Modesto Díaz
57. Camn. Pablo Díaz
58. Camn. Pablo Sánchez
59. Camn. Pedro Bonilla
60. Camn. Pedro Dones
61. Camn. Pedro Rivera
62. Camn. Rafo Figueroa
63. Camn. Saba
64. Camn. Sánchez Guzmán
65. Camn. Tabonucal
66. Carr.842 Km. 3.8 hasta el Km. 5.2
67. Cond. Alto Monte
68. Cond. Altos de la Colina
69. Cond. Camn. del Bosque
70. Cond. Córdoba Park
71. Cond. Court Yard
72. Cond. Los Jardines de Montehiedra
73. Cond. Monte Brisas
74. Cond. Palmares de Monteverde
75. Cond. Sierra Alta Apts.
76. Cond. Sky Towers
77. Cond. Villa Universitaria
78. Hog. Magaly Díaz
79. Hog. Portal del Cielo
80. Las Flores
81. Los Campos
82. Sect. La Cuchilla
83. Sect. Los González II
84. Sect. Morcelo
85. Sect. Villa Margarita
86. Sector Betancourt
87. Sector Caimito Bonito
88. Sector Chapero
89. Sector Dulce
90. Sector Julito
91. Sector La Marina
92. Sector Las Amapolas
93. Sector Las Flores
94. Sector Los Cocos
95. Sector Los Frailes
96. Sector Mercedes Park
97. Sector Minao
98. Sector Puntito
99. Senderos de Montehiedra
100. Urb. Alturas de Borinquen Gardens
101. Urb. Borinquen Gardens
102. Urb. Bosque de los Frailes
103. Urb. Camn.s del Bosque
104. Urb. Carmen Hills
105. Urb. Chalet Santa María
106. Urb. El Mirador
107. Urb. García
108. Urb. Hacienda Las Ceibas
109. Urb. Hillside
110. Urb. La Campiña
111. Urb. La Sierra del Río
112. Urb. Laderas de San Juan
113. Urb. Los Caldas
114. Urb. Mansiones de Villanova
115. Urb. Milaville
116. Urb. Mirador de Borinquen
117. Urb. Mirador de Milaville
118. Urb. Monte Alvernia
119. Urb. Monte Verde Real
120. Urb. Montehiedra del Oeste: Los Árboles
121. Urb. Palacio de la Reina
122. Urb. Palacio del Rey
123. Urb. Palacio Real
124. Urb. Parque de Monte Verde I y II
125. Urb. Parque Forestal
126. Urb. Quintas de Beverly Hills
127. Urb. Rose Ville
128. Urb. Terrazas de Borinquen Gardens

=== Cupey ===
1. Apto. Benet Suite
2. Apto. Casa Nuestra Sra. de los Angeles
3. Apto. Davila’s Apts.
4. Apto. El Abanico
5. Apto. Elmaria
6. Apto. Estancias del Boulevard
7. Apto. Parque El Señorial
8. Bo. Cupey Alto
9. Bo. Cupey Bajo
10. Camn. Alberto Gotay
11. Camn. Alejandrino
12. Camn. Alfonso Viera
13. Camn. Anastasio
14. Camn. Ángel Viera
15. Camn. Ángela Gotay
16. Camn. Antonio Matos
17. Camn. Armando Marrero
18. Camn. Arriaga
19. Camn. Bonaire
20. Camn. Caloca
21. Camn. Cándido Aponte
22. Camn. Coronel Wallington
23. Camn. Cruz Romero
24. Camn. Cuatro Calles
25. Camn. De León
26. Camn. Don Diego
27. Camn. Dr. Juliá
28. Camn. El Capá
29. Camn. El Flamboyán
30. Camn. El Jobo
31. Camn. El Mudo
32. Camn. El Sembrador
33. Camn. Emiliana Marrero
34. Camn. Esquilín
35. Camn. Félix Betancourt
36. Camn. Flamboyán
37. Camn. Gabino Rodríguez
38. Camn. Guiltucci
39. Camn. Herminia Alemán
40. Camn. Iglesias
41. Camn. La Granja
42. Camn. La Grúa
43. Camn. La Ponderosa
44. Camn. Las Curías (Camn. Tito Trinidad)
45. Camn. Las Piedras
46. Camn. Loma del Viento
47. Camn. Los Alejandro
48. Camn. Los Andino
49. Camn. Los Aponte
50. Camn. Los Ayala
51. Camn. Los Betancourt
52. Camn. Los Bonilla
53. Camn. Los Conde
54. Camn. Los Figueroa
55. Camn. Los Figueroa
56. Camn. Los Fraternos
57. Camn. Los Garcia
58. Camn. Los García
59. Camn. Los González
60. Camn. Los Guayabos
61. Camn. Los Guzmán
62. Camn. Los Hernández
63. Camn. Los López
64. Camn. Los Matos
65. Camn. Los Olivera
66. Camn. Los Pastrana
67. Camn. Los Peraza De Jesús
68. Camn. Los Pomales
69. Camn. Los Rivera
70. Camn. Los Robles
71. Camn. Los Serrano
72. Camn. Lucas Astasio
73. Camn. María Teresa de Journet
74. Camn. Morales Díaz
75. Camn. Pedro Castro
76. Camn. Pedro Viera
77. Camn. Pepe Morales
78. Camn. Peraza De Jesús
79. Camn. Rafaela Gotay
80. Camn. Ramón del Toro
81. Camn. Rodríguez Pérez
82. Camn. S.U. de Cupey
83. Camn. Severo Hernández
84. Camn. Sierra
85. Camn. Sinforiano Pastrana
86. Camn. Ventura Castillo
87. Camn. Zenón Viera
88. Carr. Antigua Vía
89. Carr. Antigua Vía
90. Comunidad Carraízo
91. Cond. Alturas de San Juan
92. Cond. Alturas del Bosque
93. Cond. Alturas del Señorial Apts.
94. Cond. Arcos de Cupey
95. Cond. Camn.s Verdes I y II
96. Cond. Chalets de Monte Atenas
97. Cond. Chalets de San Gerardo
98. Cond. Churchill Park
99. Cond. Colina Real
100. Cond. Colinas de Cupey
101. Cond. Garden Valley
102. Cond. Garden Valley Club
103. Cond. La Sierra del Monte
104. Cond. Miradero Court
105. Cond. Mont Blanc
106. Cond. Parque de Cupey
107. Cond. Paseo del Bosque
108. Cond. Paseo del Caribe
109. Cond. Paseo del Rocío
110. Cond. Paseo Monte
111. Cond. Portales de Arcobaleno
112. Cond. Pórticos de Cupey
113. Cond. Puerto Paseo
114. Cond. San Gerardo
115. Cond. San Juan Chalets
116. Cond. San Juan Tower
117. Cond. Sierra del Sol
118. Cond. Tiffany Tower (Cond. 844)
119. Cond. Tropical Courts
120. Cond. Villas de las Flores
121. Cond. Villas del Monte
122. Cond. Villas del Señorial
123. Egda. Perpetuo Socorro
124. Egida Juan Ruíz Vélez
125. Hog. Dando Vida
126. Hog. Madre Teresa
127. Hogar Ebenezer
128. Hogar Santa Teresa Jornet
129. Litheda Apts.
130. Reparto Félix Román
131. Res. Brisas de Cupey
132. Res. Jardines de Cupey
133. Res. Los Laureles
134. Res. Los Lirios
135. Residencial Alturas de Cupey
136. Rivieras de Cupey (Casas)
137. Sect. El Abanico
138. Sect. La Marina
139. Sect. Los Pinos
140. Sect. Los Pizarro
141. Sector Cupey Bajo
142. Sector Cupey Bajo
143. Sector El Hoyo I
144. Sector El Mangó
145. Sector Guadalupe
146. Sector Hogar del Niño
147. Sector Lucianito
148. Tramo Carr. 844
149. Tramo Carr. 844
150. Tramo Carr. 845
151. Tramo Carr. 845 Km. 1.9
152. Tramo Carr. PR-844
153. Urb. Ciudad Señorial
154. Urb. Colinas de Cupey
155. Urb. Colinas de Fair View
156. Urb. Cooperativa UTT de Vivienda (Los Choferes)
157. Urb. Cupey Gardens
158. Urb. El Dorado
159. Urb. El Señorial
160. Urb. El Señorial
161. Urb. El Vigía
162. Urb. Estancias San Gerardo
163. Urb. Ext. San Gerardo
164. Urb. Fair View
165. Urb. La Alborada
166. Urb. La Rosa
167. Urb. La Sierra Alta
168. Urb. Laderas de Palma Real
169. Urb. Lake View
170. Urb. Les Chalets Court
171. Urb. Litheda
172. Urb. Los Adoquines
173. Urb. Los Húcares
174. Urb. Los Lirios
175. Urb. Los Paseos
176. Urb. Mansiones de Río Piedras
177. Urb. Monte Atenas
178. Urb. Paseo Alto
179. Urb. Paseo de la Fuente
180. Urb. Paseo del Parque
181. Urb. Paseo del Prado
182. Urb. Paseo Las Brisas
183. Urb. Paseo las Vistas I y II
184. Urb. Paseo Mayor
185. Urb. Paseo Real
186. Urb. Paseo San Juan
187. Urb. Penn
188. Urb. Portal de Las Cumbres
189. Urb. Portal de los Pinos
190. Urb. Purple Tree
191. Urb. Repto. del Pilar
192. Urb. Repto. Tulipán
193. Urb. Riberas del Señorial
194. Urb. Rivieras de Cupey
195. Urb. Rivieras de Cupey (Calle Petunia C6-C8 y Calle Monte Briton C1-C5)
196. Urb. San Gerardo
197. Urb. San Rafael
198. Urb. Terrazas de Fair View
199. Urb. Vereda del Monte
200. Urb. Villa Húcar
201. Urb. Villa Olga
202. Urb. Villas de Cupey
203. Urb. Villas de Cupey (Casas X-9 y X- 10)
204. Urb. Villas de Paseo Sol
205. Urb. Villas del Este
206. Urb. Villas del Lago
207. Urb. Villas del Señorial
208. Urb. y Ext. Sagrado Corazón
209. Villas de Monte Atenas

=== El Cinco ===
1. Barriada Venezuela
2. Calle Guadalcanal
3. Cond. Alda 1553
4. Cond. Cooperativa Los Robles
5. Cond. El Paraíso
6. Cond. El Paraíso Floral Court
7. Cond. Jardines Metropolitanos
8. Cond. Los Olmos
9. Sector El Cinco
10. Sector Estación Experimental
11. Urb. Antonsanti
12. Urb. Belisa
13. Urb. Industrial San José
14. Urb. Jardines Metropolitanos
15. Urb. Villa Canales
16. Urb. Villa de Las Américas
17. Urb. Villa Los Olmos
18. Urb. Villa Nevárez

=== Gobernador Piñero ===
1. Apart. Caparra Park
2. Apt. Town House San Patricio
3. Bda. Borinquen
4. Bda. Las Monjas
5. Carr. 21
6. Comunidad La Marina
7. Cond. Altamira
8. Cond. Borinquen Towers
9. Cond. Caparra View
10. Cond. Centro de Altamira
11. Cond. Chalets de Landrau
12. Cond. Iberia I y II
13. Cond. La Fuente
14. Cond. Las Américas Park
15. Cond. Las Lomas
16. Cond. Medical Center
17. Cond. Metro Court
18. Cond. Portal Urbano
19. Cond. The Residence 1310
20. Cond. The Village
21. Cond. Villa Magna Paradise
22. Cond. White Tower
23. Egda. Casa Metropolitana
24. Egda. Ciudad del Retiro
25. Hog. Etapas I
26. Hog. Refugio del Veterano
27. Hogar Cordero Inc.
28. Hogar María Ayarde Inc.
29. Hospital Centro Médico
30. Hospital Metropolitano
31. Res. Santa Elena y Res. Vista Hermosa
32. Res. Villa España
33. Sect. Parada 27
34. Sector Los Ranchos Norte
35. Sector Monacillo2
36. Urb. Altamira
37. Urb. Alturas de San Patricio
38. Urb. Caparra Heights
39. Urb. Caparra Heights
40. Urb. Caparra Terrace
41. Urb. Caparra Terrace
42. Urb. Caparra Terrace
43. Urb. Caparra Terrace
44. Urb. Caparra Terrace
45. Urb. Ext. El Cerezal
46. Urb. La Riviera
47. Urb. Las Américas
48. Urb. Las Lomas
49. Urb. Mansiones de Altamira
50. Urb. Puerto Nuevo
51. Urb. Puerto Nuevo
52. Urb. Puerto Nuevo
53. Urb. Puerto Nuevo
54. Urb. Puerto Nuevo Norte
55. Urb. Reparto Landrau
56. Urb. Reparto Metropolitano
57. Urb. Reparto Metropolitano
58. Urb. Reparto Metropolitano
59. Urb. Reparto Metropolitano
60. Urb. Reparto Metropolitano
61. Urb. Summit Hills
62. Urb. Villa Borinquen
63. Urb. Villa Magna
64. Villa Pelícano

=== Hato Rey Central ===
1. Apartamentos 136
2. Apt. Renaissance Square
3. Bda. Aldea del Bien
4. Bda. Buena Vista
5. Bda. Modelo
6. Cond. Altagracia Apts.
7. Cond. Aranjuez
8. Cond. Ávila
9. Cond. Barbosa Apts.
10. Cond. Bilbao
11. Cond. Cádiz
12. Cond. Caribbean Sea
13. Cond. Centrum Plaza
14. Cond. Cintrón Rivera
15. Cond. Duarte
16. Cond. Duero
17. Cond. El Ferrol
18. Cond. El Prado
19. Cond. Executive Tower
20. Cond. Floral Park Gardens
21. Cond. French Plaza
22. Cond. Génesis
23. Cond. Golden Apts.
24. Cond. Granada
25. Cond. Hato Rey
26. Cond. Jardines de Francia
27. Cond. Jardínes de Guayama
28. Cond. Málaga
29. Cond. Méjico I
30. Cond. París Apts.
31. Cond. Park Tower
32. Cond. Plaza del Rey
33. Cond. Quintana A y B
34. Cond. Roosevelt Avenue Apts
35. Cond. Royal
36. Cond. Seride
37. Cond. Teide
38. Cond. Torre Alta
39. Cond. Torre de Oro
40. Cond. Torrelinda
41. Cond. Torres de Francia
42. Cond. Uruguay 274
43. Cond. Venus Plaza A, B, C
44. Cond. Venus Tower
45. Cond. Violeta Apts.
46. Cond. Vizcaya Tower
47. Égida de la Enfermera Práctica
48. Égida el Paraíso
49. Égida Hogar Casa Primavera Urb. Pérez Morris
50. Égida. Emiliano Pol
51. Mayagüez Court
52. Res. Jardines de Guayama
53. Res. Jardines de Quintana
54. Res. Juan César Cordero Dávila
55. Sect. el Relincho
56. Sect. Hato Rey
57. Sect. Jurutungo
58. Urb. Dávila y Llenza
59. Urb. El Prado
60. Urb. Floral Park
61. Urb. Héctor Piñero o Urb. Umpierre
62. Urb. Quintana
63. Urb. Regional

=== Hato Rey Norte ===
1. Calle La Cerámica (Tokío)
2. Cond New Center Plaza
3. Cond Torre Cibeles I y II
4. Cond. 364
5. Cond. Aquablue
6. Cond. Atrium Plaza
7. Cond. Bayside Cove
8. Cond. Chateau de San Juan
9. Cond. Égida del Abogado
10. Cond. El Centro I y II
11. Cond. El Maribel
12. Cond. El Vedado Court
13. Cond. Garden Center
14. Cond. Golden Court I y II
15. Cond. Hato Rey Centro
16. Cond. Jardines de Cuenca
17. Cond. Jenaro Cortés (Villa del Asociado)
18. Cond. La Morada
19. Cond. Las Américas Court
20. Cond. Lourdes
21. Cond. Mirador del Parque I y II
22. Cond. Parque Centro
23. Cond. Parque de las Fuentes
24. Cond. Parque de Loyola
25. Cond. Pavilion Court
26. Cond. Plaza Antillana
27. Cond. Quantum
28. Cond. Segovia
29. Cond. The Coliseum Tower
30. Cond. Torre del Cardenal
31. Cond. Torres de San Juan
32. Égda. La Merced
33. Egda. Petroamérica Pagán
34. Egda. Viewpoint at Domenech.
35. Égida del Maestro
36. Ext. Roosevelt
37. Res. Nemesio R. Canales
38. Urb. Baldrich
39. Urb. de la Policía
40. Urb. El Maestro
41. Urb. El Vedado
42. Urb. Huyke
43. Urb. Hyde Park
44. Urb. Ingenieros
45. Urb. La Merced
46. Urb. Parque Central (Los Maestros)
47. Urb. Roosevelt

=== Hato Rey Sur ===
1. Apartamento 1060
2. Apartamentos Diva
3. Apartamentos Olimpo Plaza
4. Apt. Duke Apts.
5. Apt. Elena Apts.
6. Apt. Geigel Apts.
7. Apt. Las Marías Court
8. Apt. Marimir Apts.
9. Apt. Santa Ana Apartment
10. Apt. Santa Rita
11. Apto. Hotel Oviedo
12. Apto. Santa Bárbara
13. Apto. Sunrise Elderly
14. Apto. Yale Apts. 1, 2, 3 y 4
15. Cond. Beatriz Lassalle
16. Cond. Caribe
17. Cond. Claribel
18. Cond. Columbia Plaza
19. Cond. Cornell
20. Cond. Darlington
21. Cond. Diana
22. Cond. El Monte
23. Cond. Floral Court
24. Cond. Hato Rey Plaza
25. Cond. Hyde Park Tower
26. Cond. Jardín Universitario
27. Cond. La Borinqueña
28. Cond. Las Caobas
29. Cond. Linares
30. Cond. Los Flamboyanes
31. Cond. Los Jardines Town House
32. Cond. Olimpo Plaza
33. Cond. Plaza Universidad 2000
34. Cond. Plaza Universitaria
35. Cond. Puerta Real
36. Cond. San Miguel
37. Cond. Turabo
38. Cond. Universitario
39. Cond. University Court
40. Cond. University Gardens
41. Cond. University Park
42. Cond. University Plaza
43. Cond. University Tower Cond. Metropolitano 13
44. Cond. Viera
45. Cond. Villa del Sol
46. Cond. Villas de Palma Real
47. Edificio Soltero
48. Egda. Balseiro for the Elderly
49. Egda. Perpetuo Socorro
50. Egda. The Golden Residences at the Village
51. Hogar Ancianos Miriam Avilés
52. Sect. Blondet
53. Sect. Cabrera
54. Sect. Hato Rey
55. Sect. Residencia Dentro del Campus UPR Río Piedras
56. Urb. Hyde Park
57. Urb. Santa Ana
58. Urb. Santa Ana
59. Urb. Santa Rita
60. Urb. Santa Rita
61. Urb. Solange
62. Urb. University Gardens

=== Monacillo ===
1. Apt. Ducado Las Cumbres
2. Apto. Quintas de Cupey
3. Chalets Las Cumbres
4. Cond. Alturas de Caldas
5. Cond. Apolo Tower
6. Cond. La Cumbre Gardens
7. Cond. Panorama Plaza (antes Monte de Oro)
8. Cond. Santa María
9. Cond. Torres de la Cumbre
10. Cond. Vistas de San Juan
11. Ext. La Alameda
12. Repto. Apolo
13. Res. Villa Esperanza
14. Residencia Joaquina de Berdruna
15. Urb. Alto Apolo
16. Urb. Alturas del Remanso
17. Urb. Apolo
18. Urb. Bucaré
19. Urb. El Escorial
20. Urb. El Pilar
21. Urb. El Remanso
22. Urb. El Veterano
23. Urb. High Park
24. Urb. Horizons
25. Urb. Ibernia
26. Urb. Jardines de Caldas
27. Urb. Jardines de Romany
28. Urb. La Alameda
29. Urb. La Cumbre
30. Urb. Laurel
31. Urb. Mansiones de Caldas
32. Urb. Mansiones de Romany
33. Urb. Monte Apolo Estate
34. Urb. Paraná Real
35. Urb. Parque de Caldas
36. Urb. Quintas de Cupey
37. Urb. Quintas del Señorial
38. Urb. Repto. del Pilar
39. Urb. Repto. Luchetti
40. Urb. Romany
41. Urb. Romany Park
42. Urb. San Juan Gardens
43. Urb. Villa del Pilar
44. Urb. Villas de Paraná

=== Monacillo Urbano ===
1. Apart. Portal de Santa María
2. Apartamentos 1647 (Calle Niéper)
3. Apt. Balcones de Santa María
4. Apt. Portales de Altamesa
5. Apto. La Coruña
6. Apto. Paraná 1615
7. Bo. Tierra Santa
8. Callejón Alméstica
9. Cond. Alameda Tower
10. Cond. Arboleda
11. Cond. Camn. Real
12. Cond. College Park Apts.
13. Cond. Cooperativa Jardines de San Francisco
14. Cond. Cooperativa Jardines de San Ignacio
15. Cond. De Diego 10
16. Cond. Fountainebleu Plaza
17. Cond. Fountainebleu Village
18. Cond. Jardines de Altamesa
19. Cond. La Providencia
20. Cond. Los Cedros
21. Cond. Meliyan Apts. y Urb. Santiago Iglesias
22. Cond. Metropolitan Plaza
23. Cond. Metropolitan Towers
24. Cond. Millennia Park
25. Cond. Paradise Court I y II
26. Cond. Paraná 1631
27. Cond. Paraná Real
28. Cond. Parque de los Monacillos
29. Cond. Right Court
30. Cond. San Ignacio
31. Cond. View Point
32. Cond. Vista de Los Frailes
33. Cond. Vista Verde
34. Egda. Casa Metropolitana
35. Egda. Ciudad Lumen
36. Frailes Gardens Apartment
37. Hog. Portal del Cielo
38. Res. Alejandrino
39. Res. Amapola
40. Res. San Fernando
41. Sector El Hoyo
42. Sector Los Ranchos Sur Carr. 21
43. Sector Monacillo
44. Sector Monacillo
45. Sector Monacillo Alto
46. Sector Vista Alegre
47. Sector Yambele
48. Urb Las Lomas
49. Urb. Altamesa
50. Urb. Altamesa
51. Urb. Alturas de Santa María
52. Urb. Caribe Abajo
53. Urb. Caribe Arriba
54. Urb. College Park
55. Urb. College Park
56. Urb. College Ville
57. Urb. Cooperativa Villa El Salvador
58. Urb. Crown Hills
59. Urb. De Diego
60. Urb. El Cerezal
61. Urb. El Paraíso
62. Urb. El Paraíso Oeste
63. Urb. Ext. Santa María
64. Urb. Extensión College Park
65. Urb. Frailes Norte
66. Urb. Jardínes de Vedruna
67. Urb. Mallorca
68. Urb. Mansiones de Alejandrino
69. Urb. Paradise Hills
70. Urb. Parque de Bucaré I y II
71. Urb. Parque de San Ignacio
72. Urb. Parque de Santa María
73. Urb. Parque Mediterráneo
74. Urb. Parque Señorial
75. Urb. Res. El Manantial
76. Urb. Río Piedras Heights
77. Urb. San Francisco
78. Urb. San Francisco Javier
79. Urb. San Ignacio
80. Urb. San Ramón
81. Urb. Santa María
82. Urb. Santa María Estates
83. Urb. Santiago Iglesias
84. Urb. Sevilla Biltmore
85. Urb. Villa Aida
86. Urb. Villa Borinquen
87. Urb. Villas de San Francisco
88. Urb. Villas de San Ignacio
89. Urb. Villas de Tivoli
90. Urb. y Ext. San Fernando

=== Oriente ===
1. Apt. Jardines Nueva Puerta S. J.
2. Apt. Lince Apts.
3. Apt. Villas del Paraíso Apts.
4. Apto. Rucar Apts.
5. Ave. De Diego
6. Bda. Bitumul
7. Bda. Israel
8. Bda. Israel
9. Calle Cambray
10. Calle Libertad
11. Calle San Felipe
12. Callejón Chevere
13. Calles: Jerez Jarandilla (números nones)
14. Camn. Los Álamos
15. Camn. Los Arana
16. Camn. Los Báez
17. Camn. Papo Alméstica
18. Camn. Pedro Viera
19. Camn. Segundo Fontanez
20. Centro Edad Avanzada San José
21. Com. San Felipe
22. Cond. Agueybaná
23. Cond. Agueybaná
24. Cond. Atrio Real
25. Cond. Balcones de San Juan
26. Cond. Borinquen
27. Cond. De Diego 575
28. Cond. Dos Pinos Court
29. Cond. Dos Pinos Plaza
30. Cond. El Trébol
31. Cond. Escorial
32. Cond. Galería
33. Cond. Los Ángeles Housing
34. Cond. Los Girasoles
35. Cond. Madrid Plaza
36. Cond. Montehiedra
37. Cond. Rafael Hernández
38. Cond. San José 1, 2, 3, 4, 5 y 6
39. Cond. San José Plaza A y B
40. Cond. Taíno
41. Cond. Turey
42. Cond. Valencia Plaza
43. Cond. Valencia Suites
44. Cond. Victoria Apts.
45. Cond. Villa Femenil (Cond. Villa Panamericana)
46. Egda. Row House
47. Hog. Ashley
48. Hog. Manuel Cordero
49. Hog. Sonia Báez
50. Hog. Sonia Luz del Alba
51. Rcia. Col. Ángeles Custodios
52. Res. El Prado
53. Res. La Rosa
54. Res. López Sicardó
55. Res. Manuel A. Pérez (ABC)
56. Res. Manuel A. Pérez (Edif. D, E)
57. Res. Manuel A. Pérez (Edif. F, G, H, I, J, K)
58. Res. Ramos Antonini
59. Res. San José (Proyecto 13 y 16)
60. Res. San José Res. Proyecto 17
61. Sect. Cayo Hueso
62. Sect. Embalse San José
63. Sect. Sabana Llana
64. Sect. San José
65. Sect. San José Plebiscito 1
66. Sector Bultrón
67. Sector Cumaná
68. Sector La Gallera
69. Sector Los Bigios
70. Sector Sabana Llana
71. Sector Victoria
72. Sierra Maestra Calles
73. Urb. Brisas del Valle
74. Urb. Casas Yoyo
75. Urb. Del Carmen
76. Urb. Del Carmen
77. Urb. Delicias
78. Urb. Dos Pinos
79. Urb. Dos Pinos Town House
80. Urb. Los Árboles de Montehiedra
81. Urb. Los Maestros
82. Urb. Mirador de San Juan
83. Urb. Montehiedra
84. Urb. Open Land (Villa Cádiz)
85. Urb. Rosendo Matienzo Cintrón (Los Policías)
86. Urb. San José
87. Urb. San José
88. Urb. San José
89. Urb. San José
90. Urb. Santa Bárbara
91. Urb. Senderos Estates
92. Urb. Valcárcel
93. Urb. Valencia
94. Urb. Valencia
95. Urb. Valle Universitario
96. Urb. Villa Granada
97. Urb. Villa Granada (Casas 950, 952, 954 y 956
98. Urb. Villa Navarra
99. Urb. Vista del Caño
100. Villa Clemente 1, 2, 3, 4 y 5

=== Pueblo ===
1. Apartamentos Everest Villas 51
2. Barriada Buen Consejo
3. Barriada Venezuela
4. Calle Guadalcanal
5. Cond. First Plaza
6. Cond. Mango Plaza
7. Cond. Oasis Apts.
8. Cond. Piñero
9. Cond. Vista Plaza
10. Hog. Retiro de Amor
11. Mansiones Park Gardens
12. Plaza de Recreo
13. Res. Park Court
14. Río Piedras (Pueblo)
15. Sector Capetillo
16. Urb. Cambridge Park
17. Urb. García Ubarri
18. Urb. La Experimental
19. Urb. Monterrey
20. Urb. Mora
21. Urb. Reparto Contemporáneo
22. Urb. Río Piedras Valley

=== Quebrada Arenas ===
1. Camn. Andrés Rosa
2. Camn. Avelino López
3. Camn. Dionisio Roldán
4. Camn. Isidoro
5. Camn. José Trinidad
6. Camn. Los Candelario
7. Camn. Los Colones
8. Camn. Los Correa
9. Camn. Los Cruces
10. Camn. Los Martínez I
11. Camn. Los Martínez II
12. Camn. Los Navarro
13. Camn. Los Ocasio
14. Camn. Los Solá
15. Camn. Mangual
16. Camn. Pilar Ferreira
17. Camn. Remedio Figueroa
18. Cond. Los Garito
19. Hollywood Hills I y II
20. Sect. Quintas de Caimito
21. Sector Bonito
22. Sector Buen Pastor
23. Sector La Bayamonesa
24. Sector La Copa
25. Sector La Loma
26. Sector Los López
27. Sector Los Murieles
28. Sector Monte Verde
29. Sector Paracocheros
30. Sector Sol
31. Urb. Brisas del Caribe
32. Urb. Estancias del Río
33. Urb. Hollywood Estates
34. Urb. Lomas del Sol
35. Urb. Mountain View

=== Sabana Llana Norte ===
1. Apto. Chalets D’Paraíso
2. Apto. Chalets de Ensueño
3. Apto. El Cemí
4. Apto. El Comandante
5. Apto. Hill Brothers
6. Apto. San Miguel Apts.
7. Apto. The Lofis 914
8. Apto. Valle del Paraíso
9. Calle Ramón Garay
10. Callejón Marcano
11. Camn. Capuchino
12. Camn. Las Lomas
13. Comunidad Los Peña
14. Cond. Balcones de Venus
15. Cond. Bosque Real
16. Cond. Cantizales Gardens
17. Cond. Capri Vila
18. Cond. Chalets D’ La Riviera
19. Cond. Concordia I y II
20. Cond. El Taíno
21. Cond. Estancias Chalets
22. Cond. Florimar
23. Cond. Fronteras
24. Cond. Guarionex
25. Cond. Hill Court
26. Cond. Jardines de Ensueño
27. Cond. Las Camelias
28. Cond. Las Teresas
29. Cond. Las Torres de Berwind
30. Cond. Les Jardins
31. Cond. Los Almendros Plaza
32. Cond. Los Cantizales I y II
33. Cond. Miradores de Venus
34. Cond. Monte Real
35. Cond. Montebello (Puente A tocado por límite; Puente B a Puente S)
36. Cond. Prudencio Rivera Martínez
37. Cond. Sabana Village
38. Cond. San Agustín
39. Cond. San Juan View A y B
40. Cond. Torres de Andalucía I y II
41. Cond. Torres de Cervantes I y II
42. Cond. Veredas de Venus
43. Cond. Villa Andalucía Suite
44. Cond. Villa Capri Courts
45. Cond. Villa Olímpica
46. Cuarta Extensión
47. Hog. Casa Blanca
48. Hog. Kathy II
49. Hog. Tamara Home Care
50. Hogar Villa de Recuerdo
51. Parcelas Falú (Norte)
52. Parcelas Falú (Sur)
53. Parcelas Hill Brothers (Sur)
54. Pórticos de Venus
55. Primera Extensión
56. Res. Balcones de San Martín
57. Res. Berwind
58. Res. El Flamboyán
59. Res. Jardines de Berwind (Las Casitas)
60. Res. Jardines de Berwind VBC
61. Res. Jardines de Campo Rico
62. Res. Jardines de Country Club
63. Res. Jardines de Sellés
64. Res. Los Peña
65. Res. Trujillo Alto Gardens
66. Res. Villa Andalucía Apts.
67. Sector Boulón
68. Sector Cepero
69. Sector Jerusalén
70. Sector Los Peña
71. Sector Polvorín
72. Sector Sabana Llana
73. Segunda Extensión
74. Segunda Extensión
75. Urb. Chalests de Villa Andalucía
76. Urb. Country Club
77. Urb. Country Club
78. Urb. Country Club
79. Urb. Country Club
80. Urb. Country Club Primera Extensión
81. Urb. El Cemí
82. Urb. El Comandante
83. Urb. Estancias de Campo Llano
84. Urb. Extensión Town Park
85. Urb. Hill Mansions
86. Urb. Iturregui
87. Urb. Las Virtudes
88. Urb. Park Gardens
89. Urb. Parque Montebello
90. Urb. Reparto Sevilla
91. Urb. Repto. Los Cantizales
92. Urb. Repto. Maracay
93. Urb. Sorrento Village
94. Urb. Valle de Berwind
95. Urb. Venus Gardens
96. Urb. Venus Gardens Oeste
97. Urb. Villa Andalucía
98. Urb. Villa Chica
99. Urb. Villa Granada
100. Urb. Villa Olímpica
101. Urb. Villa Prades
102. Urb. Villa Rosales
103. Urb. Vista del Atlántico
104. Urb. Vozburg
105. Urb. y Ext. Villa Capri

=== Sabana Llana Sur ===
1. Apartamentos 438
2. Apartamentos El Vigia
3. Apt. Casa Rosa
4. Apt. Chalets de Toscania
5. Apto. Town Park Villas
6. Apto. Villas de Holywood
7. Ave. De Diego
8. Barriada Hernández
9. Barriada Santo Domingo
10. Bda. San Martín
11. Calle Maracaibo
12. Chalets de Cupey
13. Com. Saint Just
14. Comunidad Clínica Antillas
15. Comunidad El Retiro
16. Cond. Alcázar
17. Cond. Chalet del Parque
18. Cond. Chalets Paseo Real
19. Cond. Crystal House
20. Cond. De Diego 444
21. Cond. De Diego Chalets
22. Cond. Dr. Leopoldo Figueroa
23. Cond. Escorial Alto
24. Cond. Green Village
25. Cond. Highland Park Apts.
26. Cond. Las Mercedes
27. Cond. Park Gardens Court
28. Cond. Park Gardens Town Houses
29. Cond. Parque de la Vista
30. Cond. Parque de la Vista II
31. Cond. Parque San Agustín
32. Cond. Portal de La Reina
33. Cond. Portales de San Juan
34. Cond. Puerta del Sol
35. Cond. Santa Rita Apts.
36. Cond. Town House
37. Cond. Verde Monte
38. Cond. Villas de Lomas Verdes
39. Cond. Villas de Montecarlo
40. Cond. Vista Verde
41. Cond. Windsor Towers
42. Ext. San Agustín
43. Finca María Luisa
44. Hog. del Carmen
45. Hog. Ebenezer
46. Hog. Plenitud Dorada
47. Hog. Rosario Foster Home
48. Hog. Sonia Báez
49. Hog. Talmai
50. Hogar Ancianos Carmelitanos
51. Hogar San Agustín y Teresa
52. Parc. Hill Brothers (Norte)
53. Res. Jardines de Monte Hatillo
54. Res. Jardines del Paraíso
55. Res. Las Dalias
56. Res. Monte Park
57. Res. San Martín
58. Sector Los Cayos
59. Sector Los Peña
60. Urb Town House Maracay
61. Urb. Alamein
62. Urb. Alturas de Berwind
63. Urb. América
64. Urb. Antigua Vía
65. Urb. Berwind Estates
66. Urb. Ciudad Central I
67. Urb. Club Manor
68. Urb. Club Manor Village
69. Urb. Colinas de Montecarlo
70. Urb. Ext. Villa Capri
71. Urb. González Seijo
72. Urb. Highland Park
73. Urb. La Vista
74. Urb. Mansiones de San Martín
75. Urb. Montecarlo
76. Urb. Park Gardens
77. Urb. Reparto Universitario
78. Urb. San Agustín
79. Urb. San Antonio
80. Urb. San Luis
81. Urb. San Martín
82. Urb. Villa Luarca
83. Urb. y Ext. Colinas Verdes

=== San Juan Antiguo ===
1. Apt. Capitol Hill 152 y 154
2. Apt. Carmen
3. Apt. La Puntilla
4. Apt. Ocean View Apt (304 Calle Norzagaray)
5. Apt. San Cristóbal 450
6. Apt. Sol 413
7. Apt. Villa Tranquilidad 6
8. Apto. Bayshore Villas
9. Apts. Balcones 413
10. Calle San Agustín
11. Com. La Perla
12. Cond. Atlantis
13. Cond. Bahía Plaza.
14. Cond. Barcelona 155
15. Cond. Capitolio Plaza A,, B, C
16. Cond. Casa Rosa
17. Cond. Casa Victoria 11
18. Cond. Castillo del Sol 257
19. Cond. Condado Lagoon
20. Cond. Coop. Alejandro Tapia 107
21. Cond. El Patio de San Juan 502 (Calle Norzagaray)
22. Cond. El Pilar 258
23. Cond. El Sol 102
24. Cond. Falansterio
25. Cond. Fortaleza
26. Cond. Gambaro 315
27. Cond. Harbor Plaza
28. Cond. Laguna Plaza
29. Cond. Las Virtudes 155
30. Cond. Luna
31. Cond. Luna 357
32. Cond. Madrid Tower 358
33. Cond. Millennium
34. Cond. Moragón 354
35. Cond. Paseo del Caribe
36. Cond. Patio Español 153
37. Cond. Pisos De Don Juan 405
38. Cond. Pisos de Don Manuel 149
39. Cond. Plaza 152
40. Cond. Reina de Castilla
41. Cond. Reina Sofía 108
42. Cond. Rodríguez Font 365
43. Cond. San Idelfonso 250
44. Cond. San Idelfonso 53
45. Cond. San Luis
46. Cond. San Sebastián Apts. 283
47. Cond. San Sebastián Apts. 50
48. Cond. San Sebastián Norte 278
49. Cond. San Sebastián Sur 279
50. Cond. Sol 250
51. Cond. Solaria Building
52. Cond. Tanca 150
53. Cond. Torre de la Reina
54. Cond. Villa Gabriela 109
55. Edif. El Gobernador 306
56. Edif. Freire 54
57. Edif. Nena 101
58. Edif. Pellot 52
59. Edif. Ponce de León 260
60. Hog. Nuestra Señora de la Providencia
61. Hog. Siervas de María
62. La Casa de los Abuelos 4
63. Res. Parque San Agustín
64. Res. Puerta de Tierra
65. Res. San Agustín
66. Res. San Antonio
67. Sect. Puerta de Tierra
68. Sect. Viejo San Juan (Bo. San Juan Antiguo)

=== Santurce ===
1. Apartamentos Bucare Laurel
2. Aparts. Cond. Victoria Plaza
3. Apt. Alamos 1010
4. Apt. Ángel Francisco 204
5. Apt. Bonilla Apts. 755
6. Apt. Caledonia Apts.
7. Apt. Cerra 604
8. Apt. Cerra 605
9. Apt. Cerra 608
10. Apt. Cerra 613
11. Apt. Cerra 615
12. Apt. Cerra 619
13. Apt. Cerra 724
14. Apt. Cerra 757
15. Apt. Cerra 807
16. Apt. De La Fuente 1510
17. Apt. Deva Apts. 68
18. Apt. Elliot Hill 604
19. Apt. Erjo 121
20. Apt. Fátima 706 (Calle Central)
21. Apt. Fátima 706 (Calle Miramar)
22. Apt. Flamboyán 864
23. Apt. Hábitat Cantera
24. Apt. Isla Nena 1511
25. Apt. Laguna Apts.
26. Apt. Las Mercedes 552
27. Apt. Los Portales I y II
28. Apt. Luciano Apts.
29. Apt. Magdalena 1155
30. Apt. Maribel Apts. 1507
31. Apt. Maribel Apts. 1509
32. Apt. Merujeras Apts. 1404
33. Apt. Miramar 662
34. Apt. Miramar City Apts. 750
35. Apt. Mirsonia 1503
36. Apt. Mirsonia 1503
37. Apt. Mirsonia 1504
38. Apt. O’kelly Plaza 55
39. Apt. Parque Victoria
40. Apt. Paseo Hawayek
41. Apt. Paseos del Conde
42. Apt. Pedreira Apts.
43. Apt. Piccioni 1113
44. Apt. River Run Apts. 154
45. Apt. Salva 551
46. Apt. San Gerónimo
47. Apt. Santa Juanita
48. Apt. Sima 166
49. Apt. St. Joseph 666
50. Apt. Toledo Apts.
51. Apt. Venecia Apts. 1505
52. Apt. Villa Crufe 563
53. Apt. Villa Pelicano
54. Apt. Villamil 158
55. Apt. Villamil 162
56. Apt. Villamil 163
57. Apt. Villas de Corozo
58. Apt. Vistas de San Juan Apts.
59. Apt. Waymouth 816
60. Apts. Bay View
61. Ashford Apts.
62. Ave. A
63. Ave. Borinquen
64. Ave. Eduardo Conde
65. Ave. Eduardo Conde Final
66. Ave. Haydee Rexach
67. Ave. Ponce de León
68. Ave. Ponce de León Pda. 25
69. Bo. Obrero
70. Bartolomé de Las Casas
71. Buenos Aires
72. Calle Bosque
73. Calle Bouret
74. Calle Constitución
75. Calle Cuevillas
76. Calle Estado
77. Calle José Martí
78. Calle Loíza
79. Calle Maribel
80. Calle San Jorge
81. Calle Tapia
82. Callejón Naguabo
83. Callejón San Hipólito
84. Calles: Río de Janeiro
85. Caracas
86. Cjn. Naguabo
87. Cjn. San Hipólito
88. Cll. Bosque
89. Cll. Bouret
90. Com. Campo Alegre
91. Com. El Chícharo
92. Comunidad El Chícharo
93. Cond- Marbella
94. Cond. 1675
95. Cond. 1953
96. Cond. Acquamarina
97. Cond. Ada Ligia
98. Cond. Afra Court
99. Cond. Aguilar
100. Cond. Alcázar 562
101. Cond. Alexander
102. Cond. Almendro 658
103. Cond. Almirante 15
104. Cond. Alturas de Santurce
105. Cond. Ambassador
106. Cond. América
107. Cond. Américo Salas 1400
108. Cond. Américo Salas 1414
109. Cond. Angélica
110. Cond. Ansonia 1603
111. Cond. Argentina 1563
112. Cond. Ashford Park 54
113. Cond. Ashford 1000
114. Cond. Ashford 1025
115. Cond. Ashford 1052
116. Cond. Ashford 1106
117. Cond. Ashford 1120
118. Cond. Ashford 1122
119. Cond. Ashford 1300
120. Cond. Ashford 1350
121. Cond. Ashford 1360
122. Cond. Ashford 884
123. Cond. Ashford 886
124. Cond. Ashford 890
125. Cond. Ashford Imperial
126. Cond. Ashford Lagoon Plaza 888
127. Cond. Ashford Plaza
128. Cond. Ashford Tower
129. Cond. Ashford Valencia 876
130. Cond. Atlantic Court 63
131. Cond. Atlantic Plaza
132. Cond. Avellano 559
133. Cond. Avenida Borinquen 1953
134. Cond. Azure (antes Cond. Playa Almendro)
135. Cond. Bahía
136. Cond. Bahía A
137. Cond. Bahíamar 52
138. Cond. Balcones de San Juan
139. Cond. Baldorioty Gardens 501
140. Cond. Baldorioty Plaza
141. Cond. Baleares 602
142. Cond. Balmoral
143. Cond. Barcelona 712
144. Cond. Barcelona Court 113
145. Cond. Barranquitas 1022 (Ashford 1022)
146. Cond. Bayola
147. Cond. Beach Court
148. Cond. Beach Court 1801
149. Cond. Bellamar
150. Cond. Belleview
151. Cond. Belmont Miramar 704
152. Cond. Bird
153. Cond. Bird Apts.
154. Cond. Borinquen Park Apts. 1506
155. Cond. Bosch 602
156. Cond. Bouret
157. Cond. Bouret 404
158. Cond. Bouret 406
159. Cond. Brisas de Monte Flores
160. Cond. Brisas de San Juan 1663
161. Cond. Bristol 1052
162. Cond. Buenaventura 136
163. Cond. Cacíque 1900
164. Cond. Canals
165. Cond. Canals 260
166. Cond. Canals 266
167. Cond. Canals Park 253
168. Cond. Canals Plaza 251
169. Cond. Candina Reef
170. Cond. Candina Sea Tower
171. Cond. Cantábrico 1260
172. Cond. Caribbean Sea View
173. Cond. Caribe 20
174. Cond. Carrión 5
175. Cond. Carrión Court 16
176. Cond. Carrión Court 5
177. Cond. Carrión Court 6
178. Cond. Carrión Court Playa
179. Cond. Carroón Court 3
180. Cond. Carus 712
181. Cond. Casa Blanca 901
182. Cond. Casa Cervantes
183. Cond. Casa Cervantes 8
184. Cond. Casa del Valle
185. Cond. Casablanca 652
186. Cond. Casablanca 67
187. Cond. Castillo Caribe 60
188. Cond. Castillo de Miramar 659
189. Cond. Castillo del Parque 155
190. Cond. Center Court
191. Cond. Central 662
192. Cond. Central 662 (Zahira)
193. Cond. Central 709
194. Cond. Central Park Apts. I
195. Cond. Cervantes
196. Cond. Cervantes 1
197. Cond. Cervantes 8
198. Cond. Cervantes 83
199. Cond. Chalet del Mar
200. Cond. Chateau Lagoon 5
201. Cond. Chateau McLeary
202. Cond. Ciqala
203. Cond. City Manor 1622
204. Cond. City View Tower
205. Cond. Ciudadela 100, 200, 300, 400, 500 y 800
206. Cond. Ciudadela 1100, 1200, 1300, 1400 y 1500
207. Cond. Ciudadela 900
208. Cond. Cobian Plaza
209. Cond. Coll Watlington
210. Cond. Colomer 115
211. Cond. Concordia 721
212. Cond. Condado 54
213. Cond. Condado 75
214. Cond. Condado Astor 1018
215. Cond. Condado Camelot 18
216. Cond. Condado Center 1102
217. Cond. Condado Court
218. Cond. Condado del Mar
219. Cond. Condado Gardens 1436
220. Cond. Condado Key 65
221. Cond. Condado Les Cours 1554
222. Cond. Condado Manssion 1213
223. Cond. Condado Manssion 67
224. Cond. Condado Masion II
225. Cond. Condado Park
226. Cond. Condado Plaza 1351
227. Cond. Condado Princes
228. Cond. Condado Real
229. Cond. Condado Suite 9
230. Cond. Condado Terrace
231. Cond. Condado Tower
232. Cond. Condado Towers 1115
233. Cond. Condado Town Houses 1158
234. Cond. Condado Tropic Sun 66
235. Cond. Condado Tropic Sun Aparments
236. Cond. Condado Village 11
237. Cond. Conde Hill
238. Cond. Conveniencia
239. Cond. Coral Inn.
240. Cond. Cosmopolitan
241. Cond. Costa Azul 2
242. Cond. Costa Mar
243. Cond. Court Plaza
244. Cond. Covadonga 550
245. Cond. Cuevillas 554
246. Cond. Cuevillas 609
247. Cond. Davinci 1131
248. Cond. De Diego 310
249. Cond. De Diego 61
250. Cond. De La Fuente 1607
251. Cond. De La Fuente 1609
252. Cond. Deilasse Ripón
253. Cond. Del Carmen
254. Cond. Del Mar 20
255. Cond. Del Parque
256. Cond. Del Parque 111
257. Cond. Del Parque 352
258. Cond. Del Valle
259. Cond. Delbrey
260. Cond. Delicias 185
261. Cond. Delmónico 157
262. Cond. Denver Bldng
263. Cond. Dharha
264. Cond. Diplomat 1126
265. Cond. Doña Raquel 173
266. Cond. Doncella 18
267. Cond. Doncella Plaza 107
268. Cond. Dos Torres 651
269. Cond. Duarte 704
270. Cond. Duffaut 172
271. Cond. Duffaut Plaza
272. Cond. Dulcinea
273. Cond. Dutch Inn Tower
274. Cond. Earle 7
275. Cond. El Almirante 15
276. Cond. El Bal House
277. Cond. El Campeador
278. Cond. El Cid
279. Cond. EL Cid 660
280. Cond. El Dorado 563
281. Cond. El Koury 656
282. Cond. El Laurel 651
283. Cond. El María Concepción 705
284. Cond. El Miramar 610
285. Cond. El Pentágono
286. Cond. El Plaza
287. Cond. El Plaza 1214
288. Cond. El Ponce
289. Cond. El Quijote
290. Cond. El Rey
291. Cond. EL Rosario 256
292. Cond. El Sol
293. Cond. El Taíno
294. Cond. El Vigía
295. Cond. Elbal Apts.
296. Cond. Elbal Gardens 1217
297. Cond. Elbal Terrace 171
298. Cond. Elbal Tower 59
299. Cond. Emajagua
300. Cond. Emperador
301. Cond. Erjo 121
302. Cond. España
303. Cond. Estado 656
304. Cond. Estado 709
305. Cond. Excelsior Tower 805
306. Cond. Executive Mansions 1373
307. Cond. Falcón 413
308. Cond. Fátima
309. Cond. Feria
310. Cond. Feria Court 1408
311. Cond. Ferramar 1060
312. Cond. Ferrman
313. Cond. Francia 1551
314. Cond. Galia 700
315. Cond. Gallery Plaza Norte
316. Cond. Gallery Plaza Sur
317. Cond. Gardens Court 278
318. Cond. Genoveva
319. Cond. Georgetti
320. Cond. Gómez Meltz 659 (Calle Central)
321. Cond. Gran Atrium
322. Cond. Granada 1757
323. Cond. Grand Royale
324. Cond. Guardiola 621
325. Cond. Guayama Apts 1505
326. Cond. Hawayek
327. Cond. Hebe Apts.
328. Cond. Hemi
329. Cond. Hilltop 658
330. Cond. Horizon House
331. Cond. Horomar 1559
332. Cond. Igualdad 262
333. Cond. Igualdad Court 270
334. Cond. Imperial Suite
335. Cond. Inca 8
336. Cond. Inmaculada
337. Cond. Inmaculada Housing 457
338. Cond. Jardín de Miramar 705
339. Cond. Jardínes de las Flores
340. Cond. Joan 827
341. Cond. Joma 1524
342. Cond. José Martí 800
343. Cond. Josefina 803
344. Cond. Julio Apts.
345. Cond. Kings Court 52
346. Cond. Kings Court 56
347. Cond. Kings Court 76
348. Cond. Kings Court 77
349. Cond. Kings Court 78
350. Cond. Kings Court 80
351. Cond. Kings Court 81
352. Cond. Kings Court Playa 59
353. Cond. Kings Court Plaza
354. Cond. Kings Court Ville 63
355. Cond. Kings Terrace 61
356. Cond. KingsVille 63
357. Cond. Krug 63
358. Cond. Krug 63
359. Cond. La Alhambra 618
360. Cond. La Casa de Santurce.
361. Cond. La Ceiba
362. Cond. La Katá
363. Cond. La Milagrosa Guest House 1018
364. Cond. La Monserrate
365. Cond. La Paz 664
366. Cond. La Paz 710
367. Cond. La Rada 1020
368. Cond. La Torre
369. Cond. La Torre de Miramar
370. Cond. Lafayette
371. Cond. Lagomar 857
372. Cond. Lagoon Flats
373. Cond. Laguna
374. Cond. Laguna Park
375. Cond. Laguna Terrace
376. Cond. Laguna Towers
377. Cond. Lake Shore
378. Cond. Las Carmelitas
379. Cond. Las Marías 1507
380. Cond. Las Marías 1509
381. Cond. Las Marías 818
382. Cond. Las Olas 1503
383. Cond. Las Palmas Court
384. Cond. Las Palomas
385. Cond. Las Teresas 357
386. Cond. Las Violetas
387. Cond. Le Rivage 15
388. Cond. Llavaneras
389. Cond. Loiza 1507
390. Cond. Loiza 1507
391. Cond. Lores 1219
392. Cond. Los Almendros 166
393. Cond. Los Almendros 168
394. Cond. Los Felices 653
395. Cond. Los Lirios
396. Cond. Los Lores
397. Cond. Los Molinos
398. Cond. Los Molinos II
399. Cond. Los Nardos A
400. Cond. Los Nardos B
401. Cond. Lourdes 58
402. Cond. Lucchetti Princess 1372
403. Cond. Luchetti 1212
404. Cond. Luchetti 1352
405. Cond. Luchetti 1359
406. Cond. Luchetti 1369
407. Cond. Luchetti 1403
408. Cond. Luchetti Park
409. Cond. Luisa 52
410. Cond. Luisa 55
411. Cond. Luisa 57
412. Cond. Luisa 60
413. Cond. Lujona Bldng.
414. Cond. Madeira
415. Cond. Madrid
416. Cond. Madrid 1760
417. Cond. Maga
418. Cond. Magdalena 1160
419. Cond. Magdalena 1202
420. Cond. Magdalena 1305
421. Cond. Magdalena 1309
422. Cond. Magdalena 1357
423. Cond. Magdalena Towers
424. Cond. Malin 614
425. Cond. Malin 835
426. Cond. Margarita 902
427. Cond. Maribel 1500
428. Cond. Maribel 1505
429. Cond. Maribel 1505
430. Cond. Maribel 1508
431. Cond. Maribel 1508
432. Cond. Maribel 1511
433. Cond. Maribel 1511
434. Cond. Maribel Apts.
435. Cond. Maribel Apts. Cond. Mirsonia 1501
436. Cond. Marila
437. Cond. Marquise
438. Cond. Marseilles 18
439. Cond. Martinal Plaza
440. Cond. Marymar 1754
441. Cond. McKiley 659
442. Cond. McKiley Court 653
443. Cond. McLeary 1760
444. Cond. McLeary 1800
445. Cond. McLeary 1802
446. Cond. Metro Plaza
447. Cond. Metropol
448. Cond. Miami Apts.
449. Cond. Miel
450. Cond. Mirador del Condado 1035
451. Cond. Miraflores 2008
452. Cond. Miraflores 903
453. Cond. Miramar 1022
454. Cond. Miramar 656
455. Cond. Miramar 700
456. Cond. Miramar 703
457. Cond. Miramar 713
458. Cond. Miramar Embassy 902
459. Cond. Miramar Housing for the Elderly (Miramar Seniors Residence)
460. Cond. Miramar Lema 609
461. Cond. Miramar Plaza 954
462. Cond. Miramar Royal 706
463. Cond. Miramar Royal 709
464. Cond. Miramar Towers 721
465. Cond. Mirel
466. Cond. Mirsonia 1501
467. Cond. Mirsonia 1502
468. Cond. Mirsonia 1502
469. Cond. Mirsonia 63
470. Cond. Mirsonia 63
471. Cond. Mont Blanc 656
472. Cond. Monte Cielo 831
473. Cond. Monte Flores 2007
474. Cond. Monte Tecla 654
475. Cond. Monterrey 109
476. Cond. Monterrey 71
477. Cond. Moreno Rodríguez 608
478. Cond. Nacar Tower 558 (Cuevillas)
479. Cond. Naranjo 702
480. Cond. Negrori
481. Cond. Nilsa 904
482. Cond. Norte Plaza
483. Cond. Ocean Bay
484. Cond. Ocean Court
485. Cond. Ocean One
486. Cond. Ocean Park
487. Cond. Ocean Park Tower
488. Cond. Oceanica
489. Cond. Olimpo 603
490. Cond. Olimpo 610
491. Cond. Olympic Tower
492. Cond. One Candina
493. Cond. Pacific Manor
494. Cond. Palma Real
495. Cond. Palmer House
496. Cond. Paoli 501
497. Cond. Park Boulevard
498. Cond. Park Terrace 1501
499. Cond. Parklane
500. Cond. Parque Central 229
501. Cond. Parque de San Juan
502. Cond. Parque del Condado
503. Cond. Parquecito 109
504. Cond. Pasarella
505. Cond. Paseo del Bosque 2011
506. Cond. Paseo Don Juan 1379
507. Cond. Patios del Mar
508. Cond. Patria 114
509. Cond. Pesante 235
510. Cond. Piazza Luchetti 1367
511. Cond. Piccioni 1104
512. Cond. Piccioni 1106
513. Cond. Pico Center
514. Cond. Piedrahita
515. Cond. Pisos de Miramar 702
516. Cond. Placid 72
517. Cond. Placid Court 71
518. Cond. Placid Court 72. Cond. Ocean One 1404
519. Cond. Placid Court 73
520. Cond. Placid Court 75
521. Cond. Placid Park 1307
522. Cond. Playa Del Condado
523. Cond. Playa del Rey
524. Cond. Playa Grande
525. Cond. Plaza
526. Cond. Plaza 20
527. Cond. Plaza Barcelona 124
528. Cond. Plaza Bellas Artes
529. Cond. Plaza De Diego
530. Cond. Plaza del Condado 64
531. Cond. Plaza del Parque
532. Cond. Plaza Inmaculada I
533. Cond. Plaza Inmaculada II
534. Cond. Plaza Luchetti
535. Cond. Plaza Martí 613
536. Cond. Plaza Stella 1362
537. Cond. Plaza Venecia 1601
538. Cond. Plaza Venecia 1610
539. Cond. Ponce de León
540. Cond. Ponce de León 274 (Calle Canals)
541. Cond. Portal de Miramar 654
542. Cond. Portal del Condado 1341
543. Cond. Portela
544. Cond. PRILA 70
545. Cond. Princesa 659
546. Cond. Puerta de la Bahía
547. Cond. Puerta del Condado 1095
548. Cond. Puerto Rico Soft
549. Cond. Puerto Rico Soft 753
550. Cond. Punta Las Marías
551. Cond. Regatta 996
552. Cond. Reino del Norte
553. Cond. Ribot
554. Cond. Riera
555. Cond. Riera 518
556. Cond. Rijo 1700
557. Cond. Ritz
558. Cond. Robinson 1456
559. Cond. Robinson 1465 Cond. Costa Condado 1420
560. Cond. Rodríguez Cerra
561. Cond. Rodríguez Moreno
562. Cond. Rodríguez Moreno 1804
563. Cond. Roman Mansion
564. Cond. Rosa Mar 220
565. Cond. Rosario 57
566. Cond. Royal
567. Cond. Royal House 708
568. Cond. Royal Pearl II 884
569. Cond. Royal Pearl III 880
570. Cond. Sagrado Corazón
571. Cond. Sagrado Corazón Lofts 420
572. Cond. Saint Marys Plaza II
573. Cond. San Antonio 712
574. Cond. San Fernando 817
575. Cond. San Gabriel 124
576. Cond. San Jorge 110
577. Cond. San Jorge 112
578. Cond. San Jorge 277
579. Cond. San Jorge Gardens 267 Apts.
580. Cond. San José
581. Cond. San José 555
582. Cond. San José 602
583. Cond. San Juan 350
584. Cond. San Juan Center
585. Cond. San Juan Park II
586. Cond. San Lorenzo 710
587. Cond. San Luis 1617
588. Cond. San Mateo
589. Cond. San Mateo Plaza
590. Cond. San Rafael 561
591. Cond. San Rafael Arcángel 3
592. Cond. Sancti Spiritus Park 1058
593. Cond. Sanjurjo 171
594. Cond. Santa Ana
595. Cond. Santa Ana 153
596. Cond. Santa Fe
597. Cond. Santa María
598. Cond. Santa María 1374
599. Cond. Santa Mónica 73
600. Cond. Santa Mónica I
601. Cond. Santa Rita
602. Cond. Santa Rita
603. Cond. Santa Teresa 650
604. Cond. Santillana
605. Cond. Santurce Apts.
606. Cond. Santurce Plaza
607. Cond. Santurce Towers
608. Cond. Sea View 1123
609. Cond. Sea View 1504
610. Cond. Sect. Condado
611. Cond. SISILA 55
612. Cond. Six Two 62
613. Cond. Sol
614. Cond. Solemar
615. Cond. Son Sid Apts.
616. Cond. St. Marys Plaza
617. Cond. Stella Maris
618. Cond. Suite
619. Cond. Sunny Court 107
620. Cond. Taft 14
621. Cond. Taft 154
622. Cond. Taft 16
623. Cond. Taft 60
624. Cond. Taft 6003
625. Cond. Taft 61
626. Cond. Taft Center 50
627. Cond. Taft Tower
628. Cond. Tapia’s Court
629. Cond. Tenerife
630. Cond. The Alexander
631. Cond. The City
632. Cond. The Grand Royal 1354
633. Cond. The Lagoon Plaza 888
634. Cond. The Loft 2014
635. Cond. The Plaza at Luchetti
636. Cond. The Residence At The Park 85
637. Cond. The Terrace
638. Cond. The Washington Plaza
639. Cond. The Washington Plaza 57
640. Cond. Torre de Miramar 709
641. Cond. Torre del Mar
642. Cond. Torre San Juan
643. Cond. Torre Santurce
644. Cond. Torrecielo
645. Cond. Torregrosa 658
646. Cond. Totti 1112
647. Cond. Tres Hermanos 151
648. Cond. Tres Marias
649. Cond. Trigo
650. Cond. Unimar 702
651. Cond. Unión 709
652. Cond. Unión 710
653. Cond. Unión 712
654. Cond. Unión Building 625
655. Cond. Unión Norte 664
656. Cond. Unión Tower 711
657. Cond. Vallecillo 127
658. Cond. Valparaíso
659. Cond. Vanderbilt 1024 (Ashford 1024)
660. Cond. Vanderbilt Lagoon
661. Cond. Venecia 1505
662. Cond. Venetian Tower
663. Cond. Venetian Tower
664. Cond. Victoria Court 660
665. Cond. Victory Gardens 1001
666. Cond. Vieques 1122
667. Cond. Villa Candy 718
668. Cond. Villa Figueroa 615
669. Cond. Villa Mimosa
670. Cond. Villa Nueva
671. Cond. Village at the Point
672. Cond. Villamar
673. Cond. Villamayor 665
674. Cond. Villamil 152
675. Cond. Villamil 160
676. Cond. Villamil 173
677. Cond. Villamil 306
678. Cond. Villángela 363
679. Cond. Villas del Parque
680. Cond. Villas del Parque 255
681. Cond. Villas del Parque 262
682. Cond. Vilomar 57
683. Cond. Viña 102
684. Cond. Viña del Mar Apts.
685. Cond. Vista al Mar
686. Cond. Vista Bella 661
687. Cond. Vista de la Laguna
688. Cond. Vista de la Laguna 111
689. Cond. Vista Horizonte I
690. Cond. Vista Horizonte II
691. Cond. Washington 26
692. Cond. Washington 28
693. Cond. Washington 60
694. Cond. Washington 72
695. Cond. Washington Executive 28
696. Cond. Water View Mansions 613
697. Cond. Waymouth Court 552
698. Cond. Wets House Canals
699. Cond. Wilson
700. Cond. Wilson 1314
701. Cond. Wilson 1357
702. Cond. Wilson 1370
703. Cond. Wilson Caribe
704. Cond. Wilson Condado Plaza 1418
705. Cond. Wilson Condado Plaza 1487
706. Cond. Wilson Lofts at Condado 1364
707. Cond. Yenoh
708. Cond. Zeinal
709. Cond.The Crown Plaza
710. Condado 1210
711. Condado Clasic 1306
712. Cuevillas Court Condominium 556
713. Edif. 757
714. Edif. Altomonte 2062
715. Edif. Arroyito
716. Edif. Caribbean Towers
717. Edif. Carmen 403
718. Edif. Cerra 724 (Taguada)
719. Edif. Eduardo Tartak 1355
720. Edif. Famma
721. Edif. Gómez 707
722. Edif. Martí 650
723. Edif. Martí 908
724. Edif. Miramar Suites 611
725. Edif. Morales 608
726. Edif. Olimpo 611
727. Edif. Olimpo 616
728. Edif. Porto 612
729. Edif. Rigau
730. Edif. Rivera Vega 1506
731. Edif. Rivera Vega 630 (Calle Cerra)
732. Edif. Rivera Vega 802
733. Edif. Rocha 855
734. Edif. Saint Peters 700
735. Edif. Salgado 701
736. Edif. San Fernando
737. Edif. San José 711
738. Edif. San Judas Tadeo 1663
739. Edif. San Rafael
740. Edif. San Rafael 601
741. Edif. Tartak 1863
742. Edif. Trelles 653
743. Edif. Troigros
744. Edif. Victoria
745. Edif. Washington Apts.
746. Edif. Zaida
747. Egda. De Enfermeras
748. Egda. La Inmaculada Elderly
749. Egda. Ocean Park
750. Egda. Plaza Gran Victoria 1312
751. Egda. Trigo Housing
752. Egida Alturas de San Juan
753. Hog. María Auxiliadora
754. Hog. Residencias Religiosas de Sagrado Corazón
755. Hogar Casa Manuel Fernández Juncos
756. Las Casas: Dolores, William, Martino, San Ciprian, Cortijo, Lippitt, Gautier Benítez, Felipe R. Goyco, Valparaíso, Lima, Nin, Webb
757. Machuchal I
758. Mckinley Court 653
759. Pda 25
760. Pda. 25
761. Península del Condado
762. Rcia. Alora 610
763. Rcia. Brisamar 706
764. Rcia. Brisas del Condado 361
765. Rcia. Paraíso 654
766. Rcia. San José
767. Res. Coop. Villa Kennedy
768. Res. El Mirador Apts.
769. Res. Las Casas
770. Res. Las Margaritas Proyecto 1 (214)
771. Res. Las Margaritas Proyecto 2 (215)
772. Res. Las Margaritas Proyecto 3 (538)
773. Res. Llorens Torres edificios 59 al 140
774. Res. Llorens Torres edificios del 1 al 58
775. Res. Los Lirios
776. Res. San Juan Bautista
777. Santa Fe Apts.
778. Sect. Alto del Cabro
779. Sect. Bo. Obrero
780. Sect. Bolívar
781. Sect. Bosque
782. Sect. Bosque
783. Sect. Bravos de Boston
784. Sect. Buena Vista
785. Sect. Cantera
786. Sect. Checo
787. Sect. Condadito
788. Sect. Condado
789. Sect. Condado Este
790. Sect. Condado Oeste
791. Sect. De Diego
792. Sect. Esquife
793. Sect. Figueroa
794. Sect. Gandul
795. Sect. Herrera
796. Sect. La Kata
797. Sect. La Marina
798. Sect. las Flores
799. Sect. Las Palmas
800. Sect. Loma del Viento
801. Sect. Los Pinos
802. Sect. Machucal III
803. Sect. Machuchal I
804. Sect. Machuchal II
805. Sect. Melilla
806. Sect. Melilla
807. Sect. Mira Palmeras
808. Sect. Miramar
809. Sect. Monte Flores
810. Sect. Monte Flores
811. Sect. Playita
812. Sect. Revuelta del Diablo
813. Sect. San Ciprián
814. Sect. San Jorge
815. Sect. San Jorge
816. Sect. San Mateo
817. Sect. Santa Elena
818. Sect. Santurce
819. Sect. Seboruco
820. Sect. Seboruco
821. Sect. Seboruco
822. Sect. Shangai
823. Sect. Tras Talleres
824. Sect. Villa Palmeras
825. Sect. Villa Palmeras
826. Sect. Villa Palmeras
827. Sect. Villa Palmeras
828. Sect. Villa Palmeras
829. Taft Tower
830. Urb. Barbe
831. Urb. Hipódromo
832. Urb. Ocean Park
833. Urb. Ocean Park
834. Urb. Park Boulevard
835. Urb. Punta Las Marías
836. Urb. Sagrado Corazón
837. Urb. Sta. Teresita
838. Urb. Villa Esperanza
839. Villa del Corozo
840. Wilson 1422

=== Tortugo ===
1. Camn. Cecilio Villegas
2. Camn. Dario Collazo
3. Camn. De Jesús
4. Camn. Solá
5. Camn. Tres Marías
6. Camn. Cecilio Berrios
7. Cond. Camelot
8. Cond. Montesol
9. Hogar Casablanca Elderly Home (Del Carmen)
10. Parc. Canejas
11. Parcelas Canejas
12. Parcelas Colinas Hasta Mañana
13. Sector El Veinte
14. Sector Hoyo Frío
15. Sector La Corte
16. Sector Los Caraballo
17. Sector Paco Galán (Pablo Galán)
18. Sector Sierra Borinquén
19. Sector Sierra Brava
20. Urb. Beverly Hills
21. Urb. Chalets de Santa Clara
22. Urb. Rose Ville
23. Urb. Santa Clara
24. Urb. Valle Forestal

=== Universidad ===
1. Calle Patillas (ambos lados hasta Ave. Ponce de León)
2. Comunidad Residencias de Profesores UPR
3. Cond. Cooperativa Jardines de Valencia
4. Cond. Isabelle
5. Cond. Radio Aeropuerto
6. Égida. Francisco Paz Granela
