= Borinquen (disambiguation) =

Borinquen or Boríquen is the Taíno and Kalinago name for Puerto Rico.

Borínquen may also refer to:

- Borinquen, Aguadilla, Puerto Rico, a barrio
- Borinquen, Caguas, Puerto Rico, a barrio
- Borinquen (Oriente), a sub-barrio of barrio Oriente in San Juan, Puerto Rico
- Borinquen (ship), a passenger liner and troop transport ship during WWII
- Borinquen Place, a street that connects the Williamsburg Bridge to Grand Street in Brooklyn, New York

== See also ==
- Boricua, the Taíno name for Puerto Ricans
