= María Moczó (Santurce) =

Subbarrio of Santurce in San Juan, Puerto Rico

Coordinates: 18°26′39″N 66°03′13″W

- Subbarrio
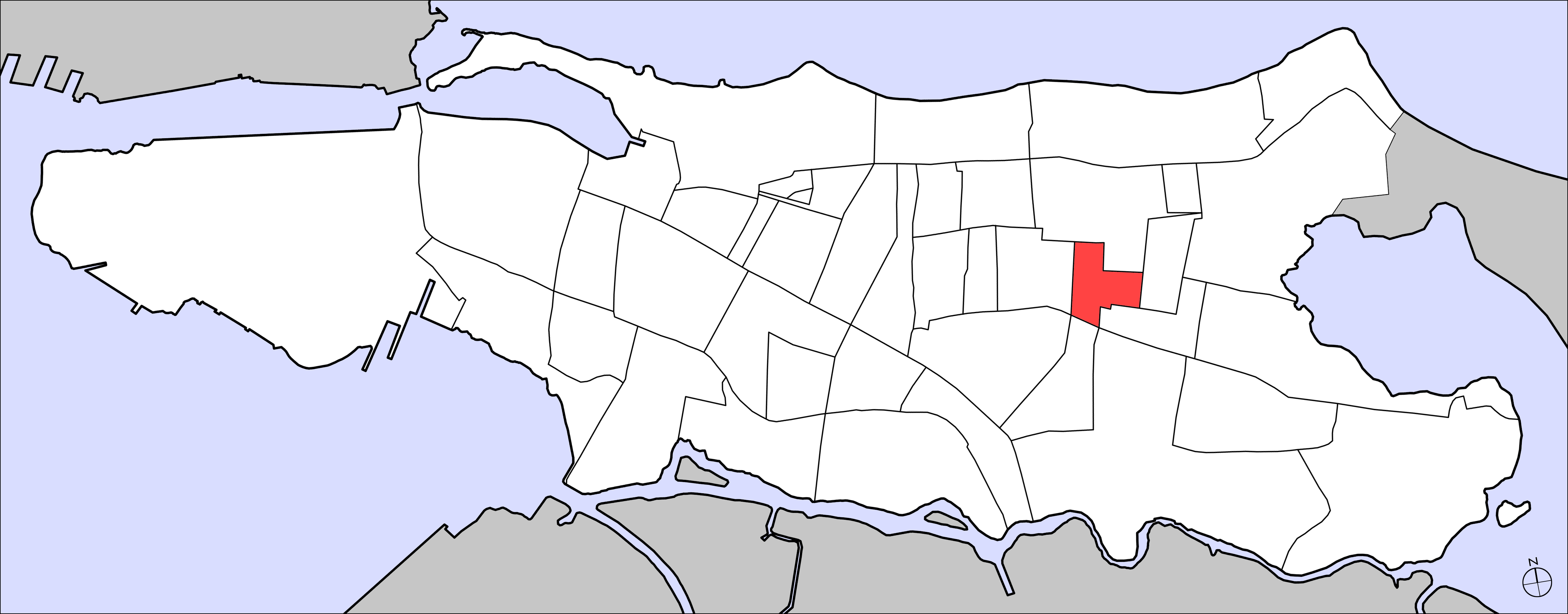
- Commonwealth: Puerto Rico
- Municipality: San Juan
- Barrio: Santurce

Area
  - Total: .04 sq mi (0.10 km^{2})
  - Land: .04 sq mi (0.10 km^{2})
- Elevation: 23 ft (7.0 m)

Population (2010)
  - Total: 1,627
  - Density: 40,675/sq mi (15,705/km^{2})
- Source: 2010 Census
- Time zone: UTC−4 (AST)

María Moczó is one of the forty subbarrios of Santurce, San Juan, Puerto Rico.

== Demographics ==
In 1940, María Moczó had a population of 3,222.

In 2000, María Moczó had a population of 1,964.

In 2010, María Moczó had a population of 1,627 and a population density of 40,675 persons per square mile.

== See also ==
- List of communities in Puerto Rico
