= Pozo del Hato (Santurce) =

Subbarrio of Santurce in San Juan, Puerto Rico

- Subbarrio
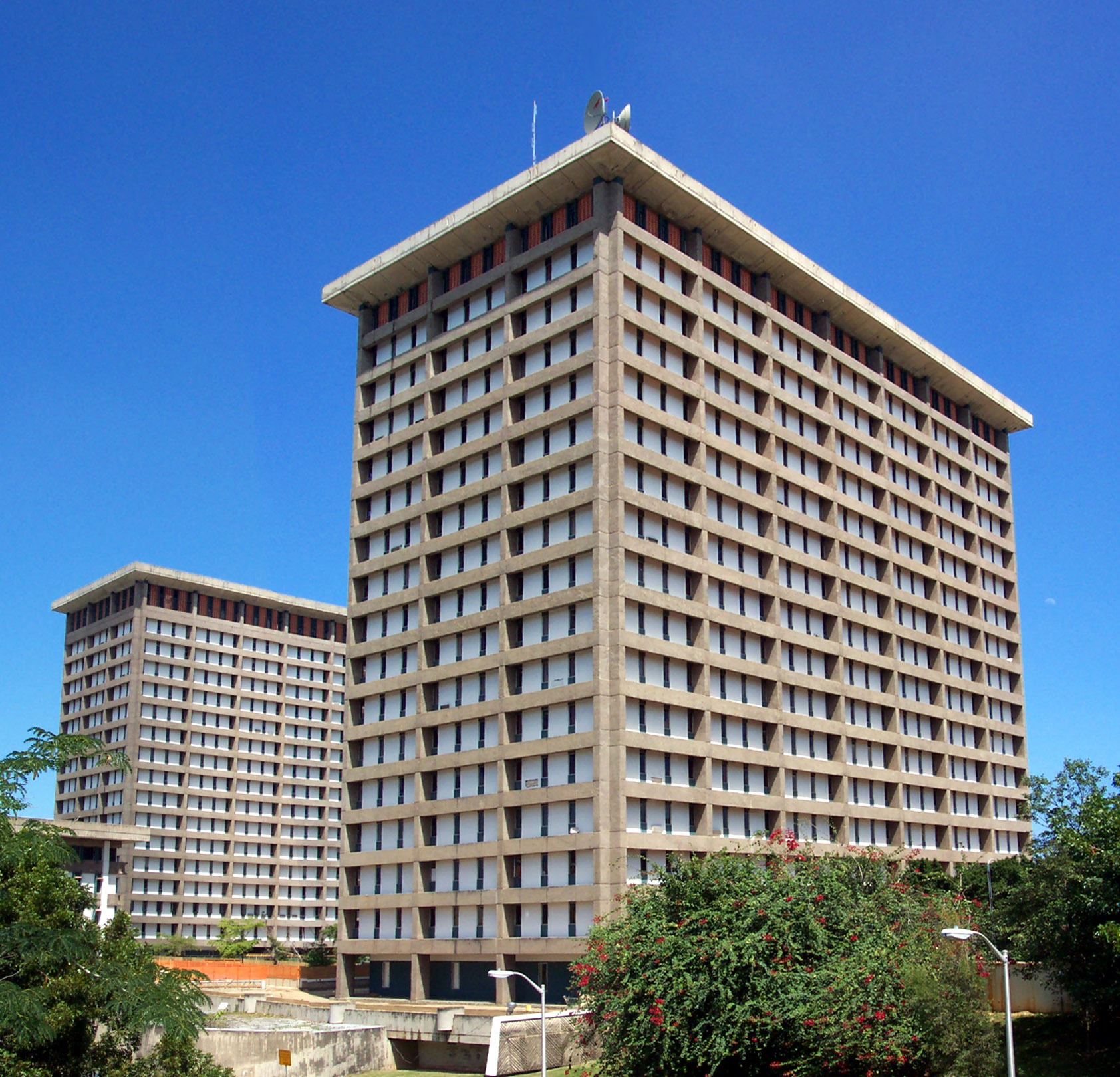
- Minillas Government Center in Pozo del Hato

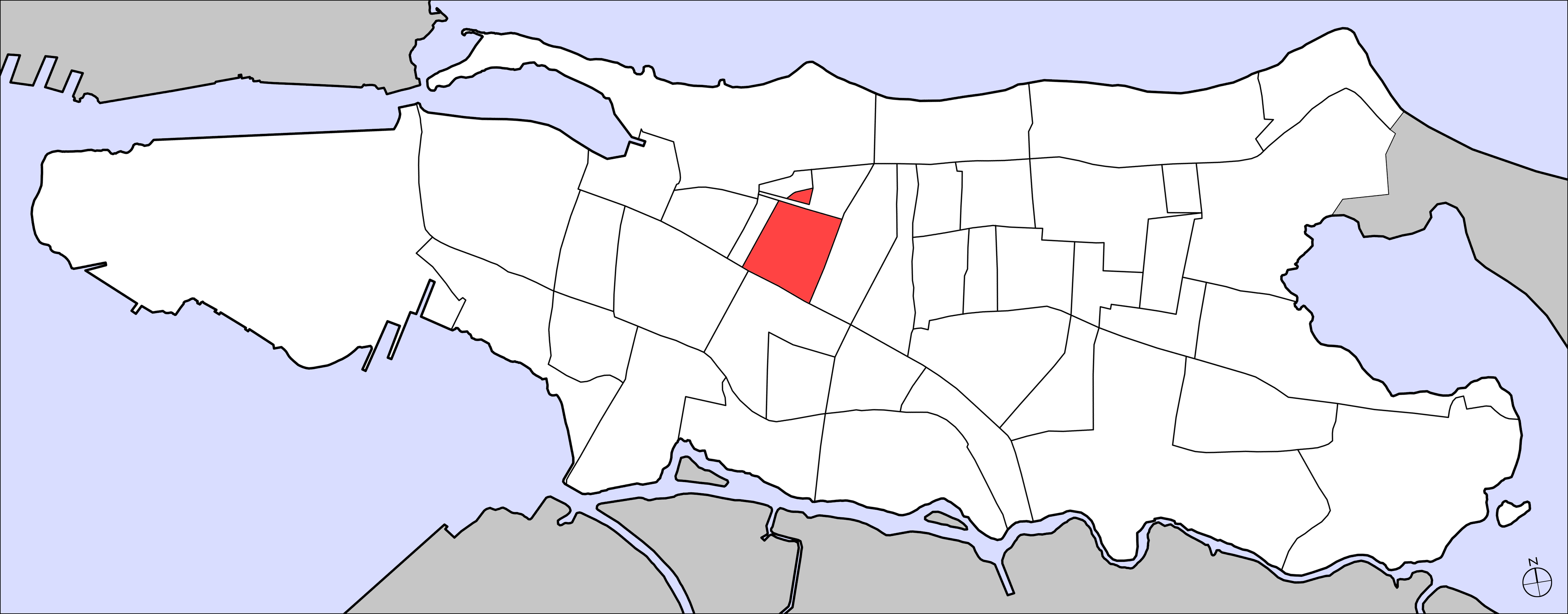
- Pozo del Hato in Santurce, San Juan
- Coordinates: 18°26′56″N 66°04′07″W
- Commonwealth: Puerto Rico
- Municipality: San Juan
- Barrio: Santurce

Area
  - Total: .07 sq mi (0.18 km^{2})
  - Land: .07 sq mi (0.18 km^{2})
- Elevation: 49 ft (15 m)

Population (2010)
  - Total: 218
  - Density: 3,114.3/sq mi (1,202.4/km^{2})
- Source: 2010 Census
- Time zone: UTC−4 (AST)

Pozo del Hato is one of the forty subbarrios of barrio Santurce in the municipality of San Juan, Puerto Rico.

== Demographics ==
In 1940, Pozo del Hato had a population of 1,615.

In 2000, Pozo del Hato had a population of 137.

In 2010, Pozo del Hato had a population of 218 and a population density of 3,114.3 persons per square mile.

== Sites ==
The following building complexes are currently listed by year:

- 1948 - Plaza de Diego Building, Health Center converted into Residential area

== See also ==
- List of communities in Puerto Rico
