= Hoare (Santurce) =

Subbarrio of Santurce in San Juan, Puerto Rico

Coordinates: 18.4451956°N 66.0841670°W

- Subbarrio
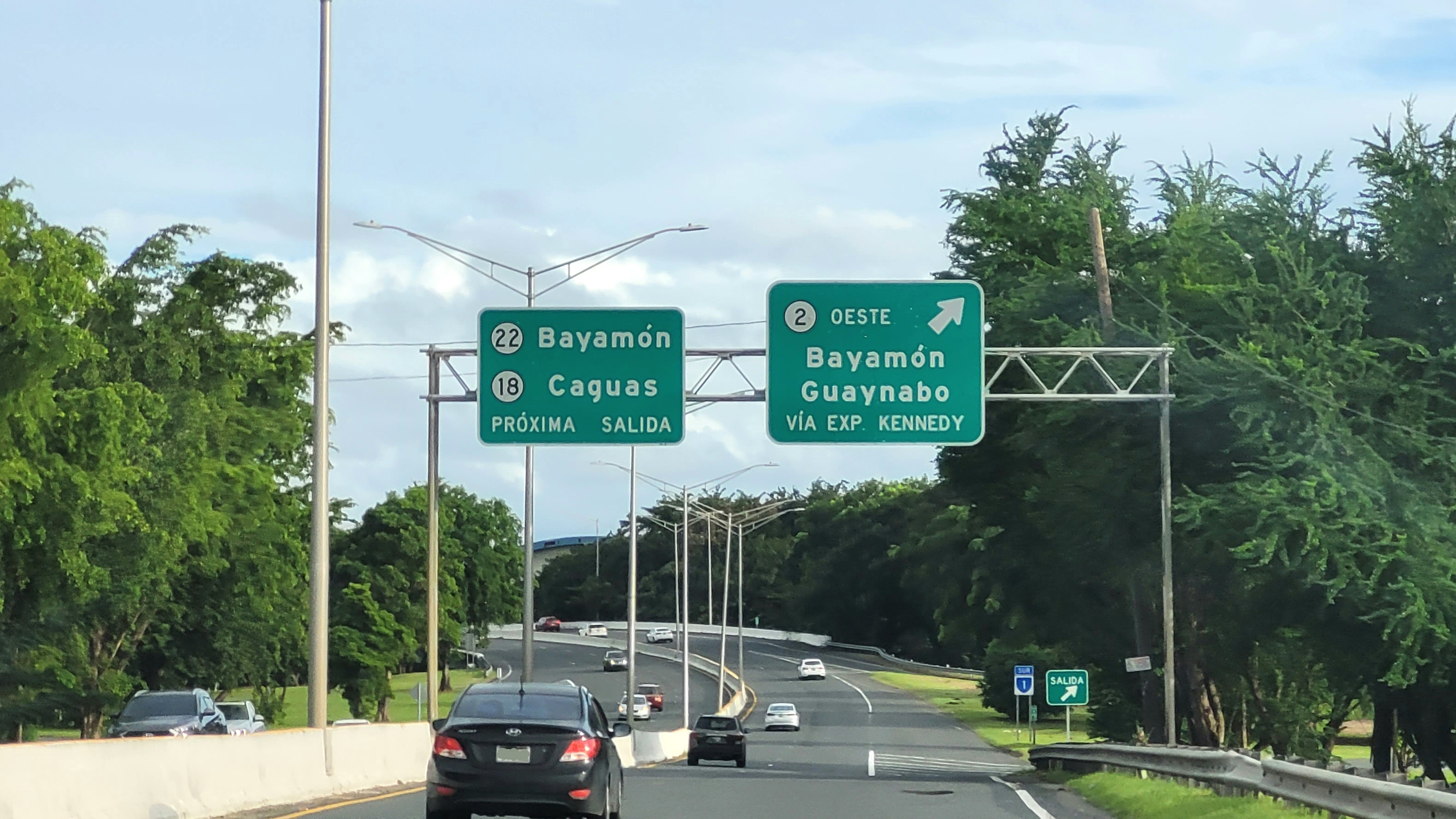
- Puerto Rico Highway 1 in Hoare

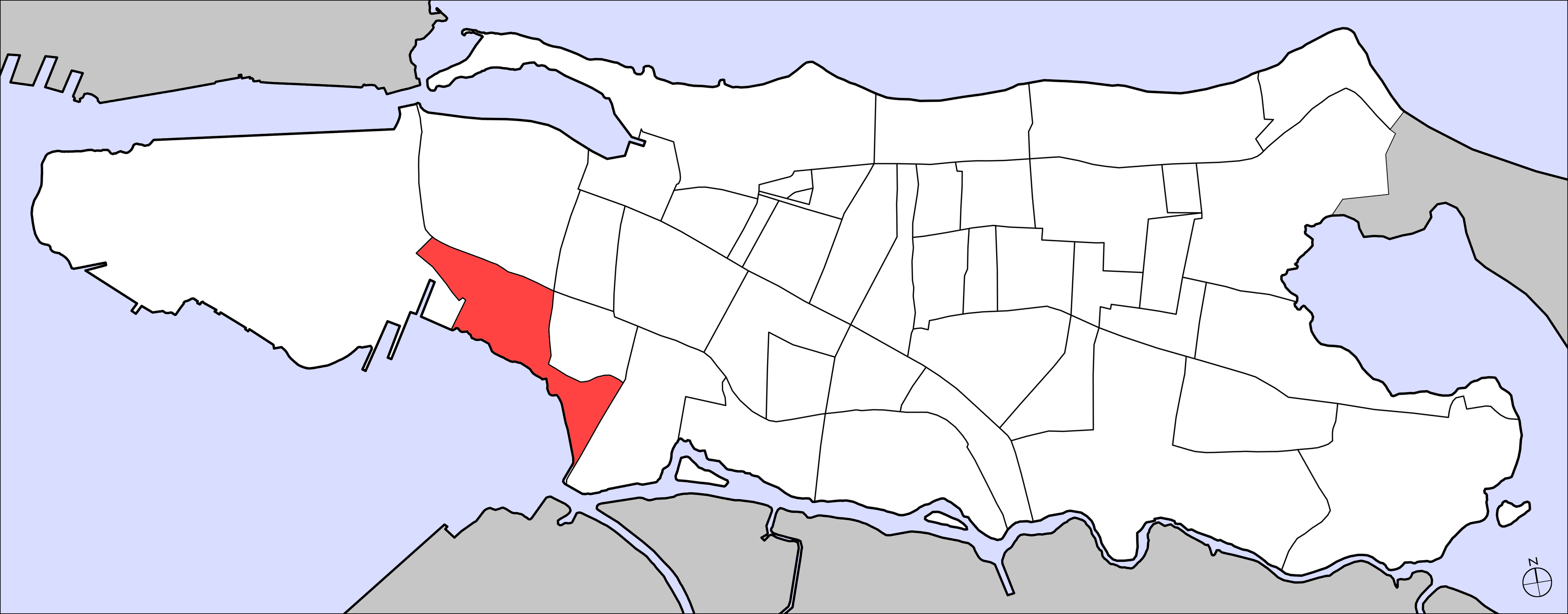
- Commonwealth: Puerto Rico
- Municipality: San Juan
- Barrio: Santurce

Area
  - Total: .30 sq mi (0.78 km^{2})
  - Land: .14 sq mi (0.36 km^{2})
- Elevation: 0 ft (0 m)

Population (2010)
  - Total: 158
  - Density: 1,128.6/sq mi (435.8/km^{2})
- Source: 2010 Census
- Time zone: UTC−4 (AST)

Hoare is one of the forty subbarrios of Santurce, San Juan, Puerto Rico.

== Demographics ==
In 1940, Hoare had a population of 5,448.

In 2000, Hoare had a population of 3.

In 2010, Hoare had a population of 158 and a population density of 1,128.6 persons per square mile.

== Places ==
The Puerto Rico Department of Education books' printing house is located in Hoare.

== Notable incidents ==
Kevin Fret, a rapper, was gunned down while riding his motorcycle in Hoare and was treated for his injuries and died in the Hoare Hospital.

== See also ==
- List of communities in Puerto Rico
