= Bayola (Santurce) =

Subbarrio of Santurce in San Juan, Puerto Rico

- Subbarrio
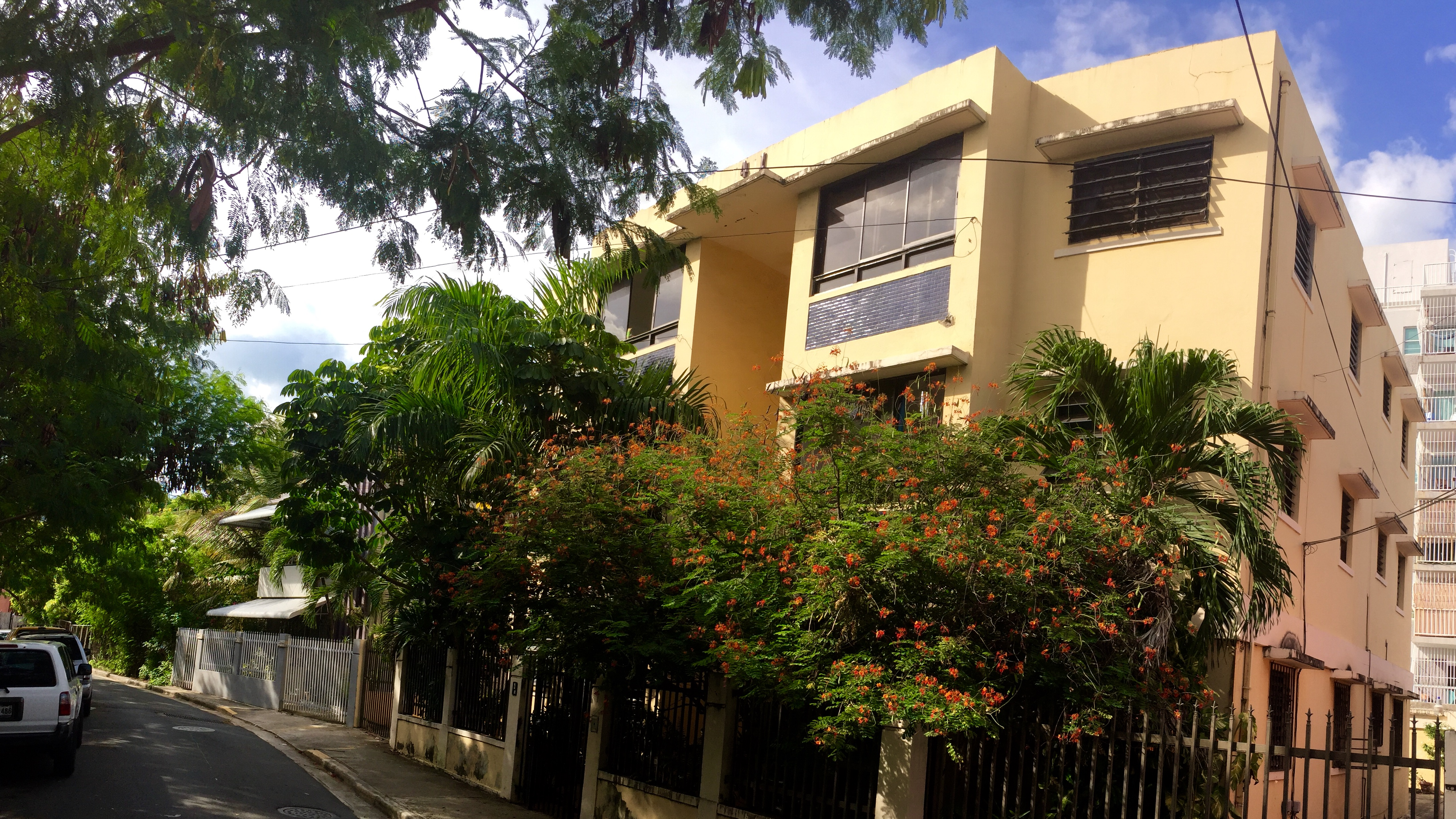
- A building on Calle Estrella in Bayola

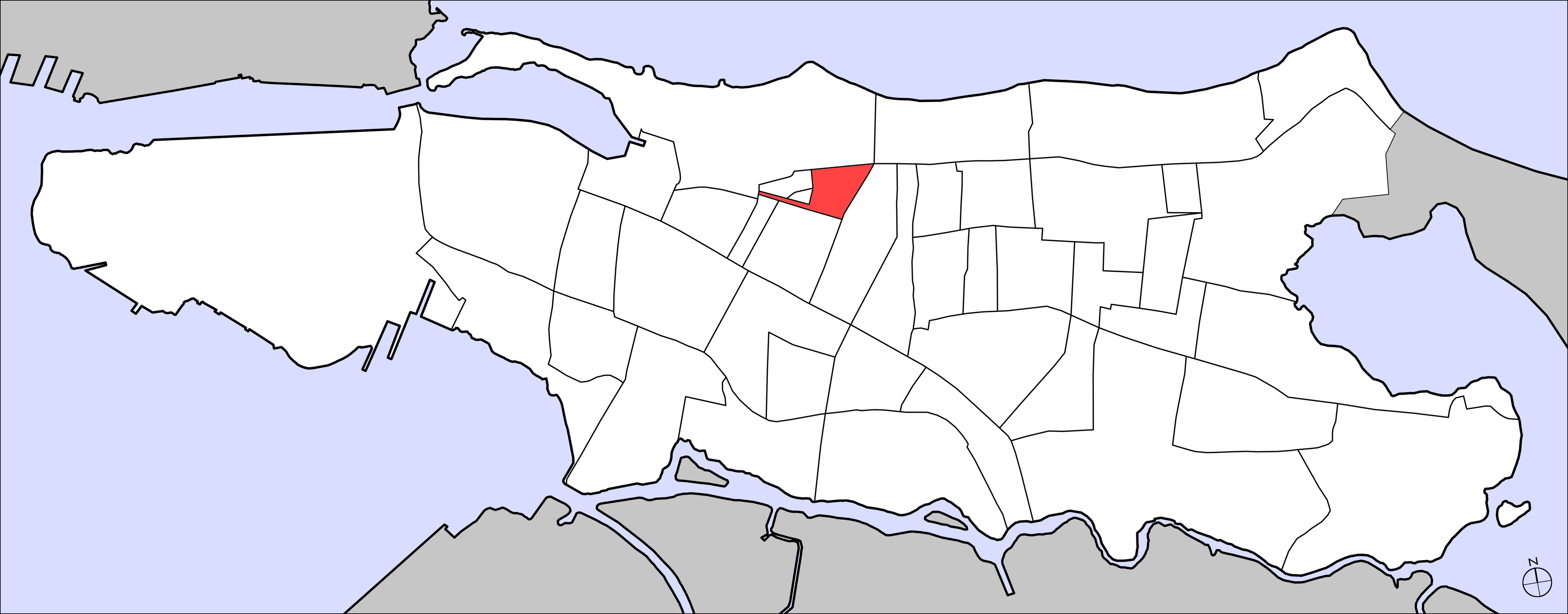
- Map of Santurce barrio with Bayola highlighted
- Coordinates: 18°27′05″N 66°03′58″W
- Commonwealth: Puerto Rico
- Municipality: San Juan
- Barrio: Santurce

Area
  - Total: .03 sq mi (0.078 km^{2})
  - Land: .03 sq mi (0.078 km^{2})
  - Water: 0 sq mi (0 km^{2})
- Elevation: 10 ft (3.0 m)

Population (2010)
  - Total: 748
  - Density: 24,933.3/sq mi (9,626.8/km^{2})
- Source: 2010 Census
- Time zone: UTC−4 (AST)

Bayola is one of the forty subbarrios of Santurce, San Juan, Puerto Rico.

It's located between Expreso Baldorioty de Castro to the south, Calle Wilson to the north, Avenida de Diego to the east and Primavera Street to the west.

Bayola comprises just 4 streets. These are Calle Estrella, Calle Tres Hermanos, Calle Washington and Calle Julian Blanco.

== Demographics ==
In 1940, Bayola had a population of 1419.

In 2000, Bayola had a population of 564.

In 2010, Bayola had a population of 748 and a population density of 24,933.3 persons per square mile.

== Gallery ==
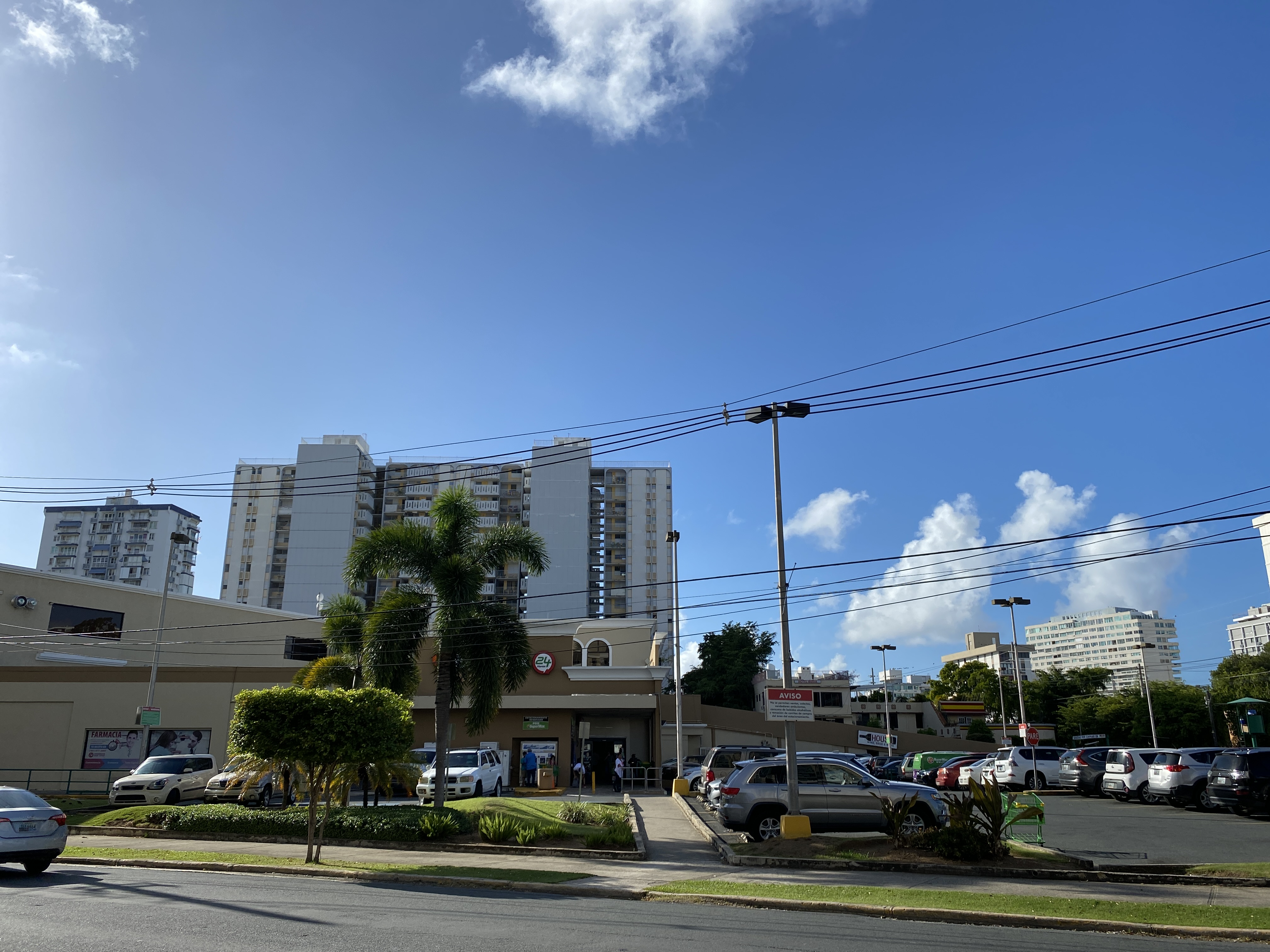
Street scene in Bayola in 2019

== See also ==
- List of communities in Puerto Rico
