= Merhoff (Santurce) =

Subbarrio of Santurce in San Juan, Puerto Rico

Coordinates: 18°26′25″N 66°02′41″W

- Subbarrio
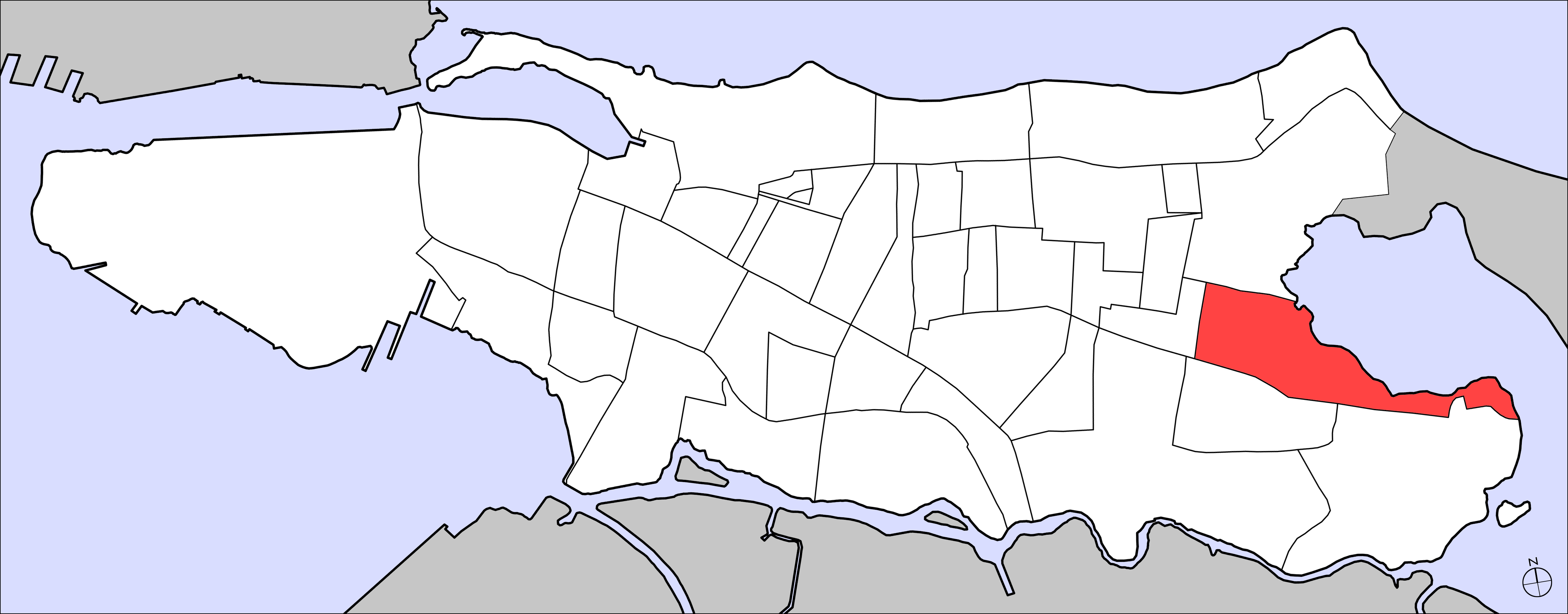
- Commonwealth: Puerto Rico
- Municipality: San Juan
- Barrio: Santurce

Area
  - Total: .28 sq mi (0.73 km^{2})
  - Land: .13 sq mi (0.34 km^{2})
  - Water: .15 sq mi (0.39 km^{2})
- Elevation: 0 ft (0 m)

Population (2010)
  - Total: 3,023
  - Density: 23,253.8/sq mi (8,978.3/km^{2})
- Source: 2010 Census
- Time zone: UTC−4 (AST)

Merhoff is one of the forty subbarrios of Santurce, San Juan, Puerto Rico.

== Demographics ==
In 1940, Merhoff had a population of 4,414.

In 2000, Merhoff had a population of 4,955.

In 2010, Merhoff had a population of 3,023 and a population density of 23,253.8 persons per square mile.

== Location ==
Although Merhoff Street commences its journey south of Baldorioty Expressway on Marginal Street, only the space covered between Gilberto Monroig Street and Conde Avenue is considered the Merhoff sector.

== See also ==
- List of communities in Puerto Rico
