= Seboruco (Santurce) =

Subbarrio of Santurce in San Juan, Puerto Rico

Coordinates: 18°26′44″N 66°03′24″W

- Subbarrio
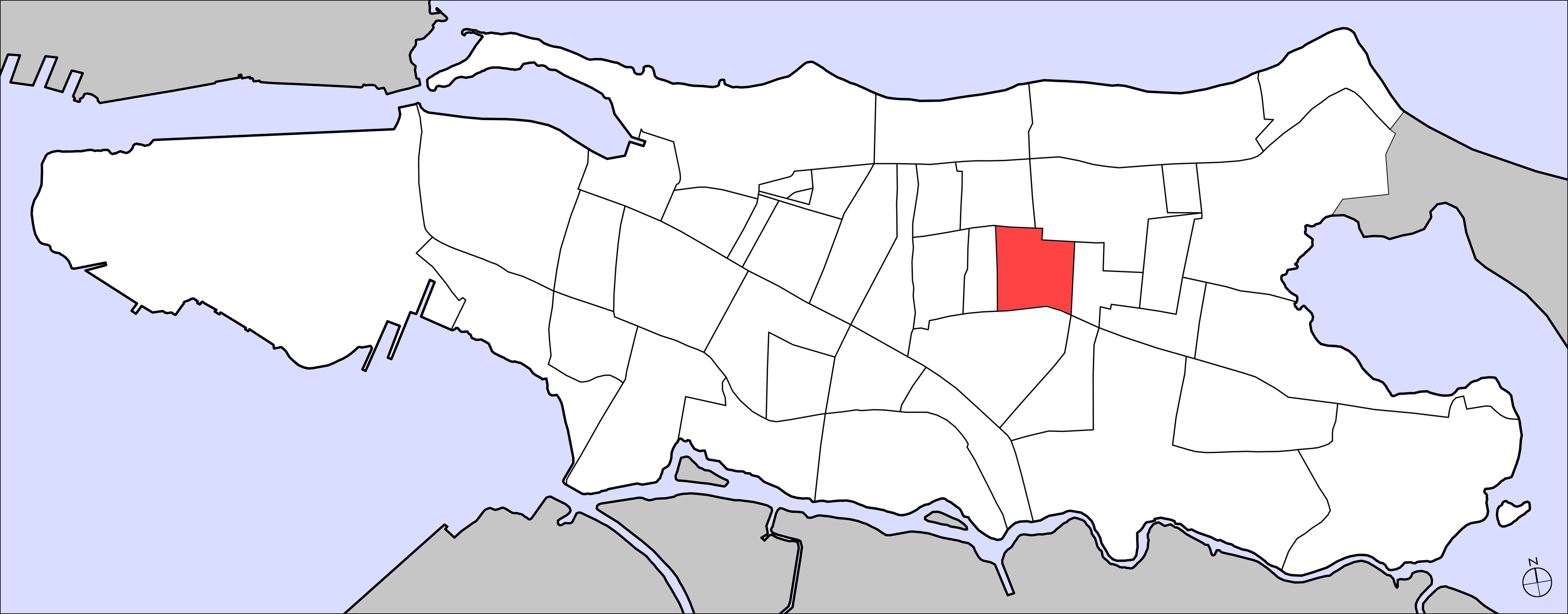
- Commonwealth: Puerto Rico
- Municipality: San Juan
- Barrio: Santurce

Area
  - Total: .07 sq mi (0.18 km^{2})
  - Land: .07 sq mi (0.18 km^{2})
- Elevation: 23 ft (7.0 m)

Population (2010)
  - Total: 1,878
  - Density: 26,828.6/sq mi (10,358.6/km^{2})
- Source: 2010 Census
- Time zone: UTC−4 (AST)

Seboruco is one of the forty subbarrios of Santurce, San Juan, Puerto Rico.

== Demographics ==
In 1940, Seboruco had a population of 2,834.

In 2000, Seboruco had a population of 2,198.

In 2010, Seboruco had a population of 1,878 and a population density of 26,828.6 persons per square mile.

== See also ==
- List of communities in Puerto Rico
