= Gandul (Santurce) =

Subbarrio of Santurce in San Juan, Puerto Rico

Coordinates: 18°27′03″N 66°04′44″W

- Subbarrio
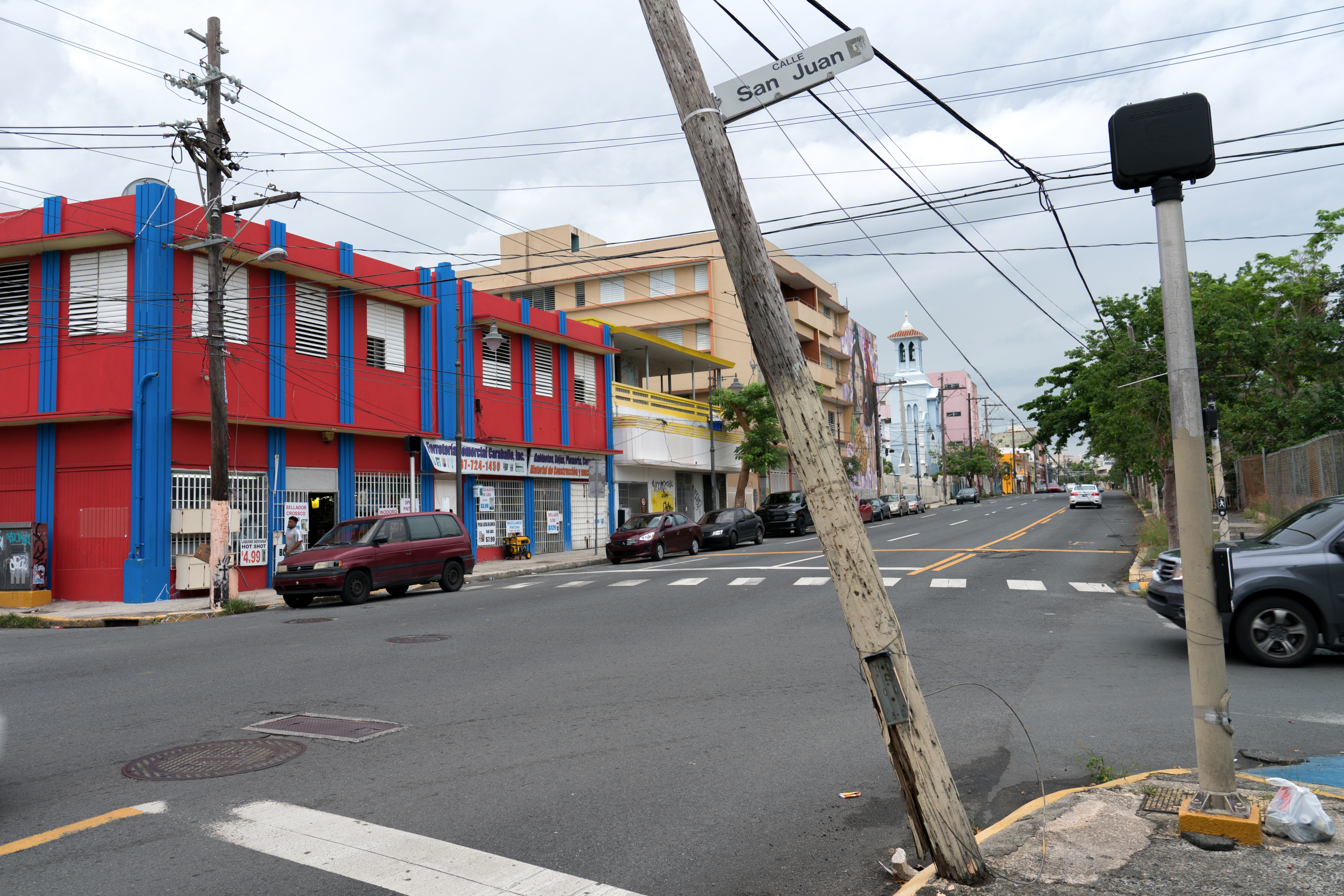
- Puerto Rico Highway 35 in Gandul after Hurricane Maria

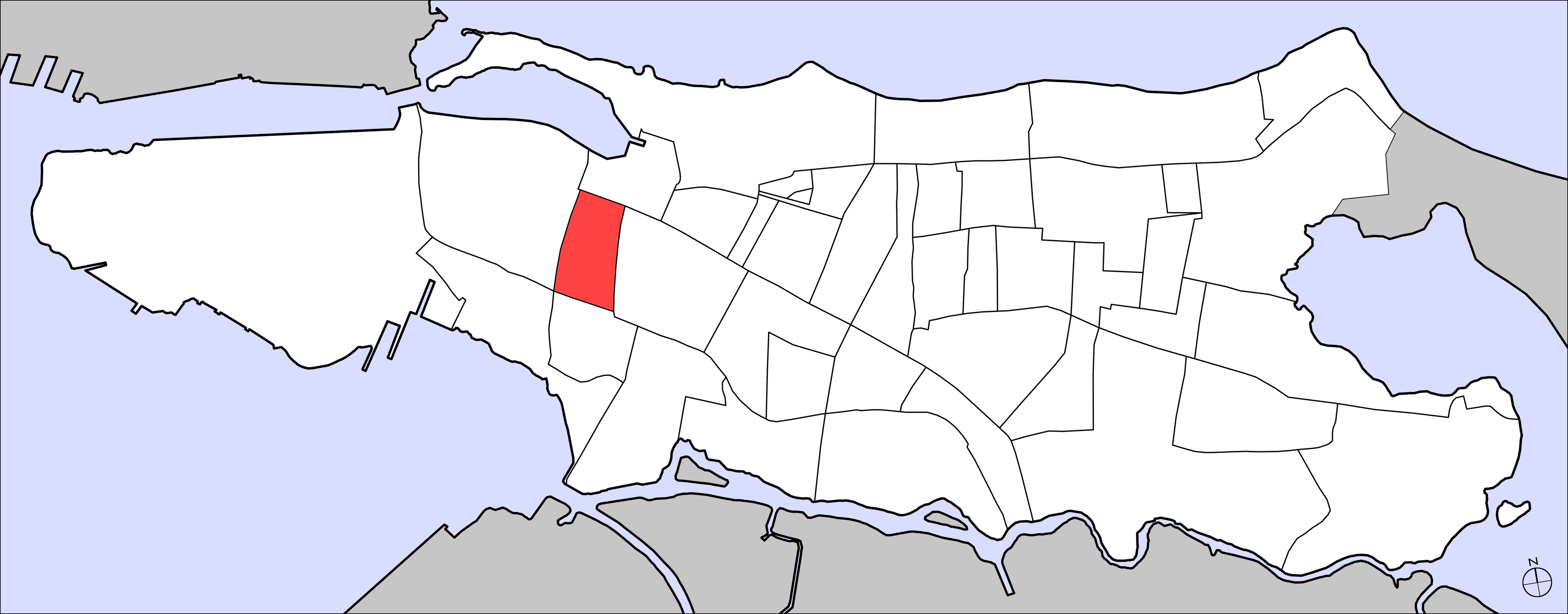
- Commonwealth: Puerto Rico
- Municipality: San Juan
- Barrio: Santurce

Area
  - Total: .07 sq mi (0.18 km^{2})
  - Land: .07 sq mi (0.18 km^{2})
- Elevation: 23 ft (7.0 m)

Population (2010)
  - Total: 1,507
  - Density: 21,528.6/sq mi (8,312.2/km^{2})
- Source: 2010 Census
- Time zone: UTC−4 (AST)

Gandul is one of the forty subbarrios of Santurce, San Juan, Puerto Rico.

== Demographics ==
In 1940, Gandul had a population of 6,134.

In 2000, Gandul had a population of 2035.

In 2010, Gandul had a population of 1,507 and a population density of 21,528.6 persons per square mile.

== See also ==
- List of communities in Puerto Rico
