= Melilla (Santurce) =

Subbarrio of Santurce, San Juan, Puerto Rico

Coordinates: 18.443665°N 66.06800°W

- Subbarrio
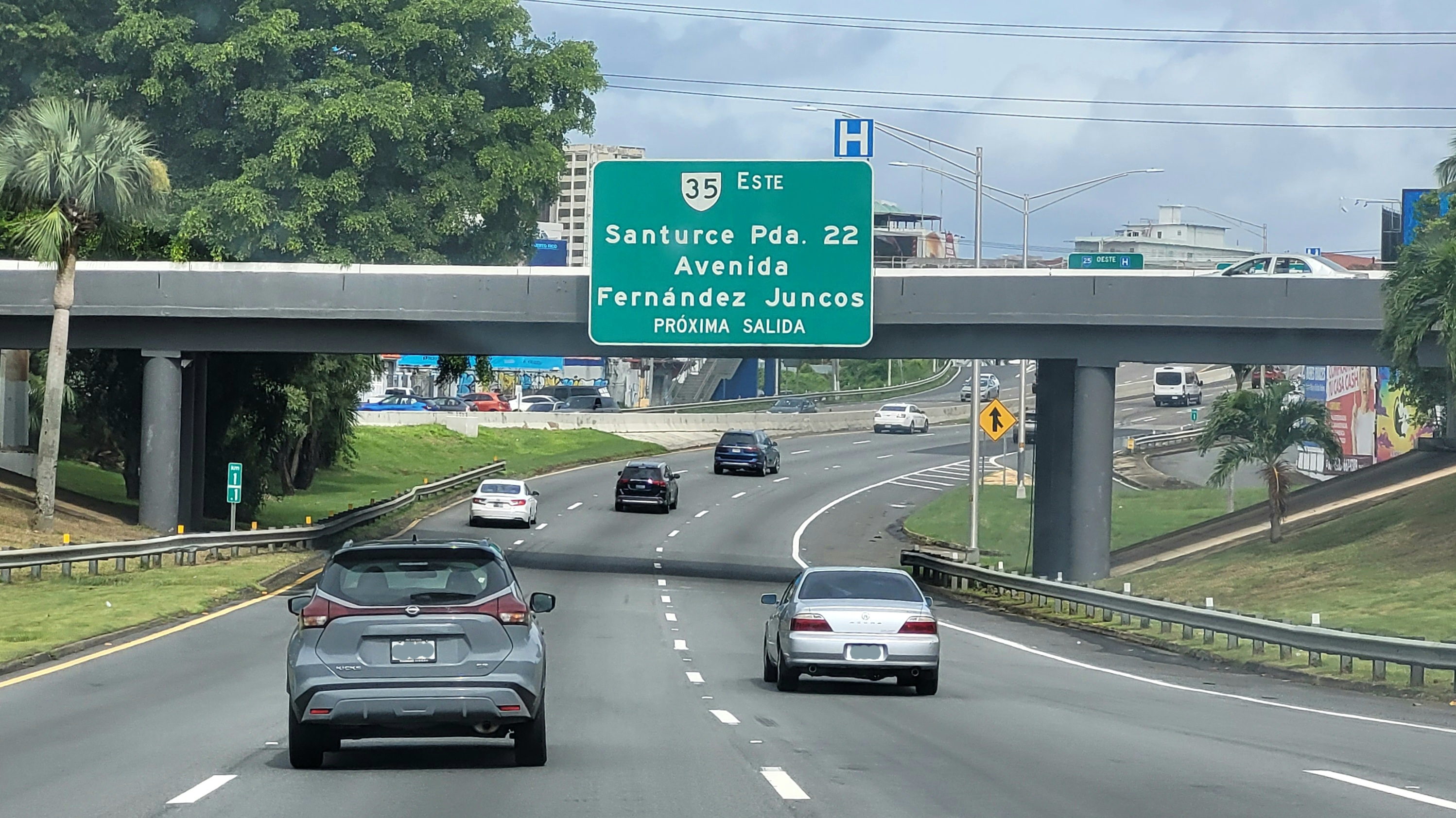
- Puerto Rico Highway 22 in Melilla

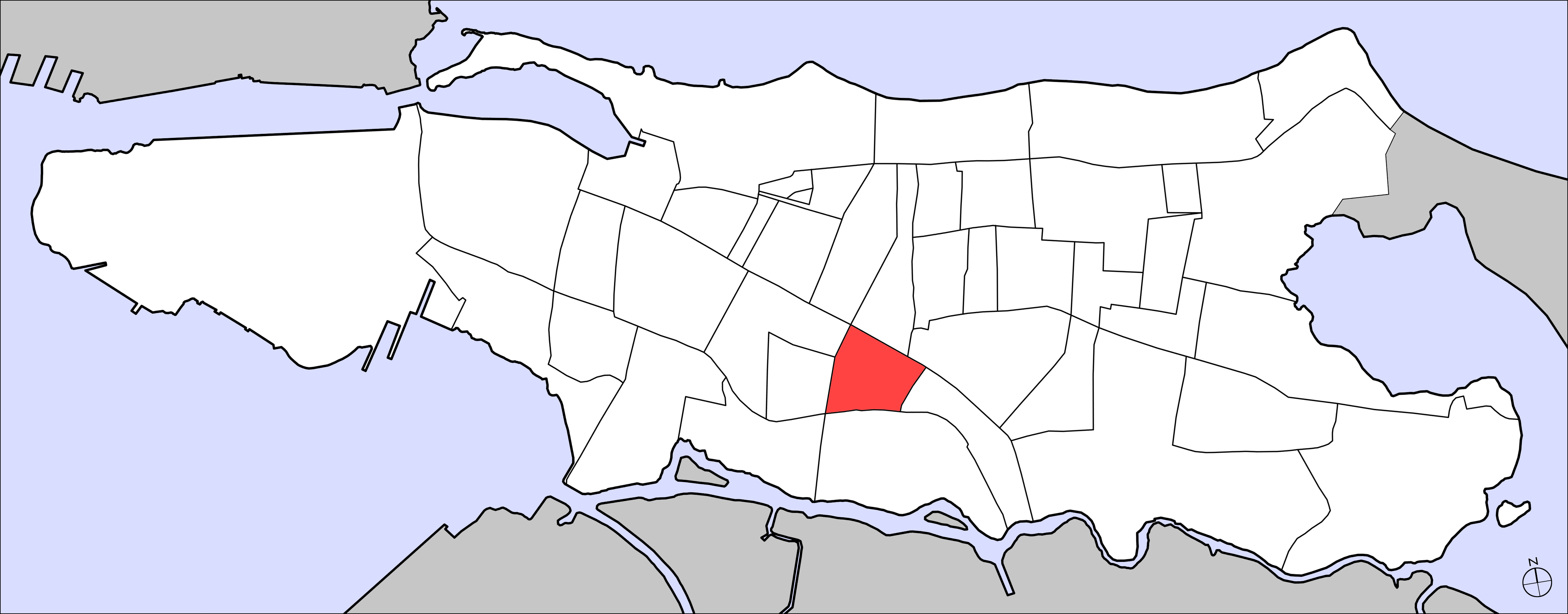
- Commonwealth: Puerto Rico
- Municipality: San Juan
- Barrio: Santurce

Area
  - Total: .05 sq mi (0.13 km^{2})
  - Land: .05 sq mi (0.13 km^{2})
- Elevation: 23 ft (7.0 m)

Population (2010)
  - Total: 785
  - Density: 15,700/sq mi (6,100/km^{2})
- Source: 2010 Census
- Time zone: UTC−4 (AST)

Melilla is one of the forty subbarrios of Santurce, San Juan, Puerto Rico.

== Demographics ==
In 1940, Melilla had a population of 3,516.

In 2000, Melilla had a population of 926.

In 2010, Melilla had a population of 785 and a population density of 15,700 persons per square mile.

== See also ==
- List of communities in Puerto Rico
