= San Juan Moderno (Santurce) =

Subbarrio of Santurce in San Juan, Puerto Rico

Coordinates: 18°27′00″N 66°03′39″W

- Subbarrio
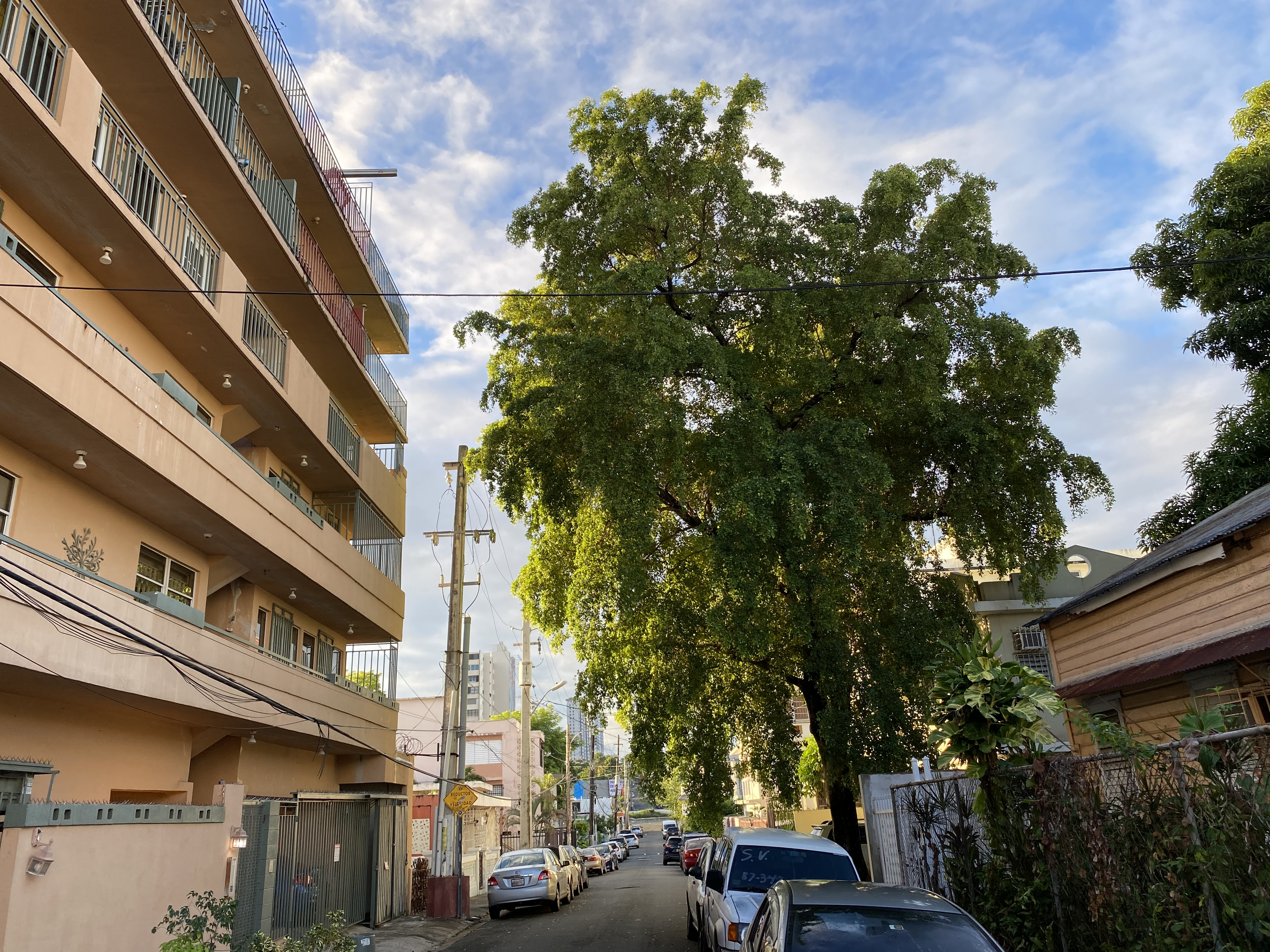
- San Juan Moderno in 2019

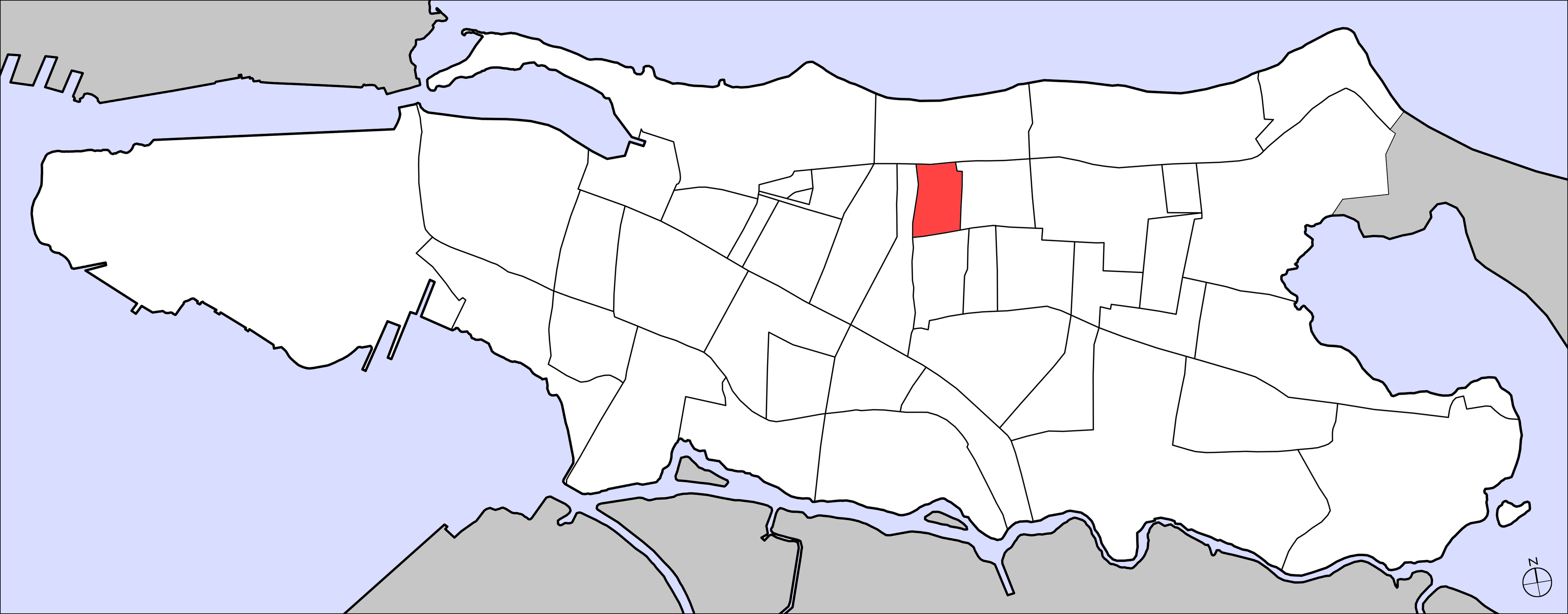
- Commonwealth: Puerto Rico
- Municipality: San Juan
- Barrio: Santurce

Area
  - Total: .04 sq mi (0.10 km^{2})
  - Land: .04 sq mi (0.10 km^{2})
- Elevation: 10 ft (3.0 m)

Population (2010)
  - Total: 925
  - Density: 23,125/sq mi (8,929/km^{2})
- Source: 2010 Census
- Time zone: UTC−4 (AST)

San Juan Moderno is one of the forty subbarrios of Santurce, San Juan, Puerto Rico.

== Demographics ==
In 1940, San Juan Moderno had a population of 1,255.

In 2000, San Juan Moderno had a population of 1,083.

In 2010, San Juan Moderno had a population of 925 and a population density of 23,125 persons per square mile.

== See also ==
- List of communities in Puerto Rico
