= Condadito (Santurce) =

Subbarrio of Santurce in San Juan, Puerto Rico

Coordinates: 18.4507763°N 66.0698890°W

- Subbarrio
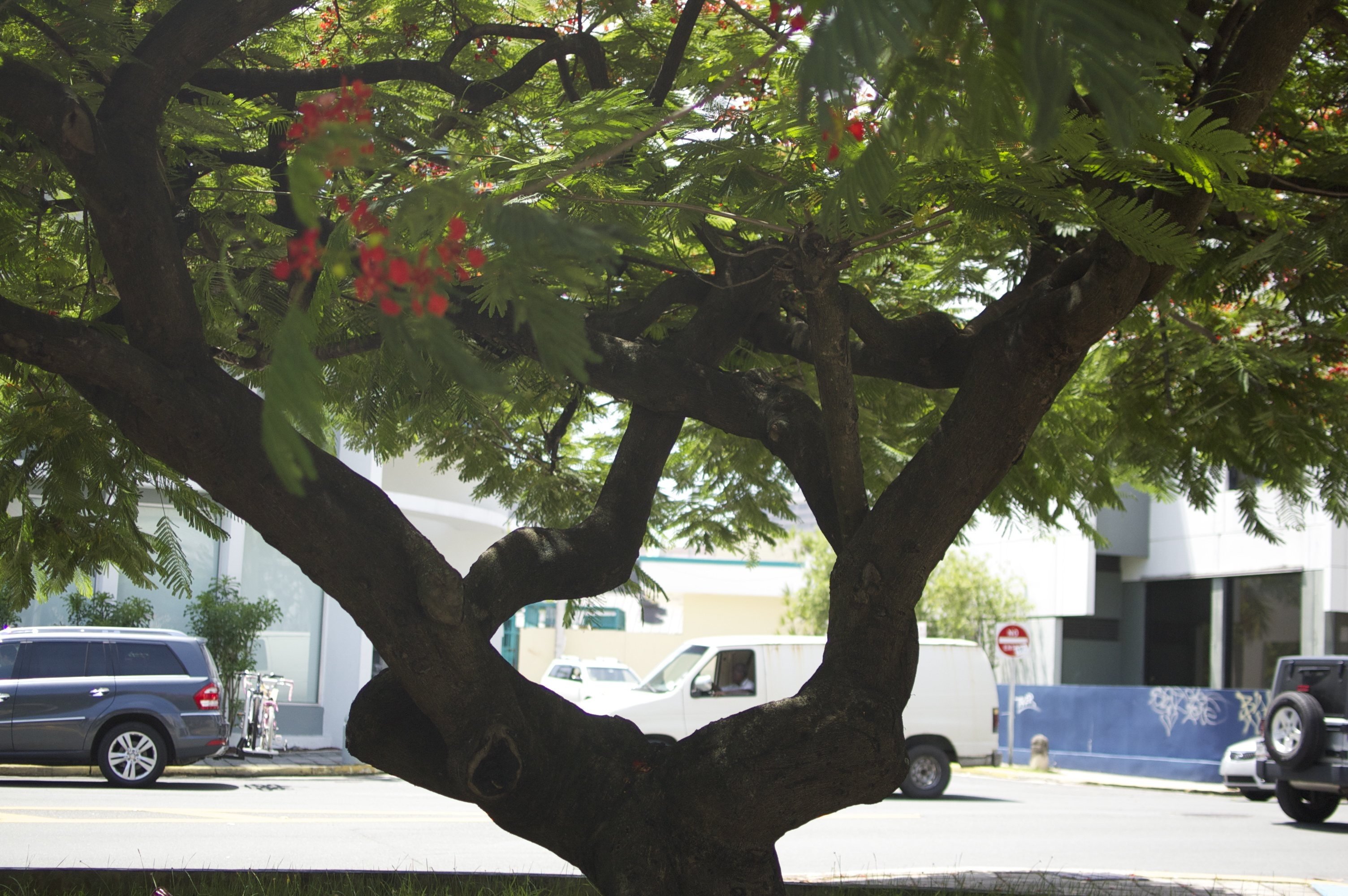
- Tree in Condadito

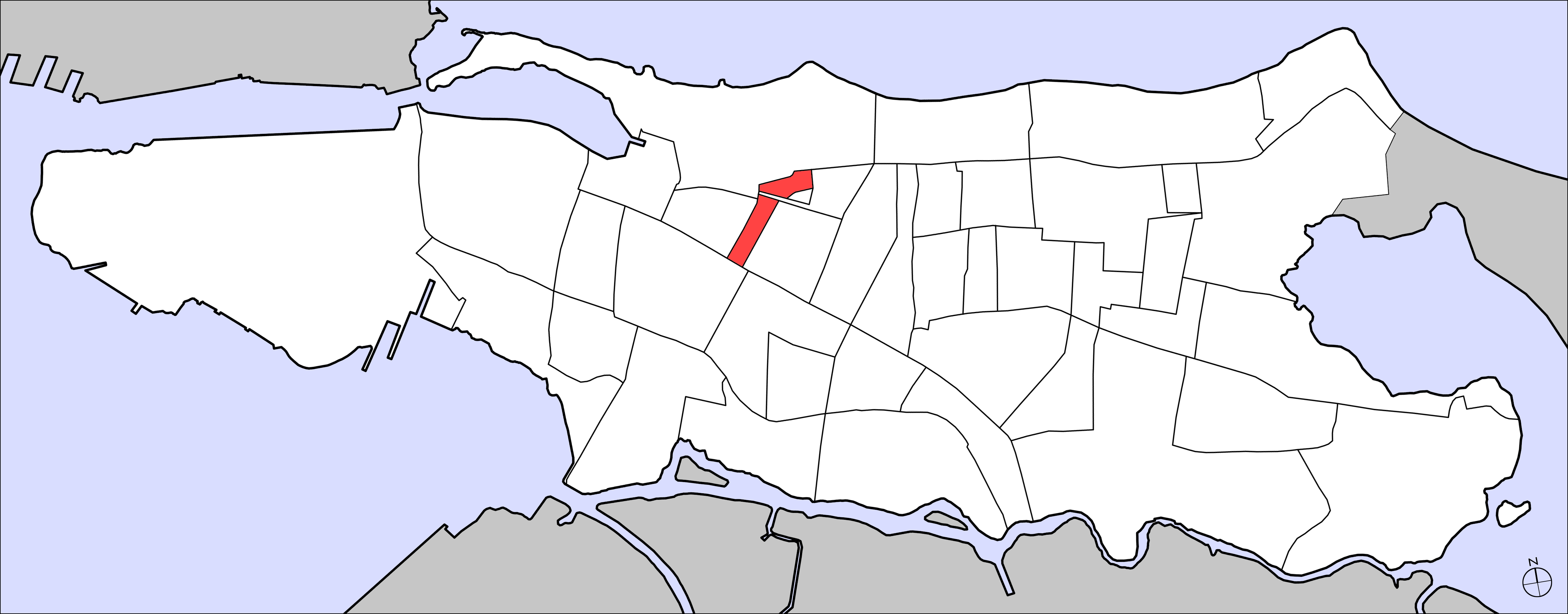
- Commonwealth: Puerto Rico
- Municipality: San Juan
- Barrio: Santurce

Area
  - Total: .03 sq mi (0.078 km^{2})
  - Land: .03 sq mi (0.078 km^{2})
- Elevation: 26 ft (7.9 m)

Population (2010)
  - Total: 629
  - Density: 20,966.7/sq mi (8,095.3/km^{2})
- Source: 2010 Census
- Time zone: UTC−4 (AST)

Condadito is the smallest of the forty subbarrios of Santurce, San Juan, Puerto Rico.

== Demographics ==
In 1940, Condadito had a population of 1,270.

In 2000, Condadito had a population of 748.

In 2010, Condadito had a population of 629 and a population density of 20,966.7 persons per square mile.

== Gallery ==
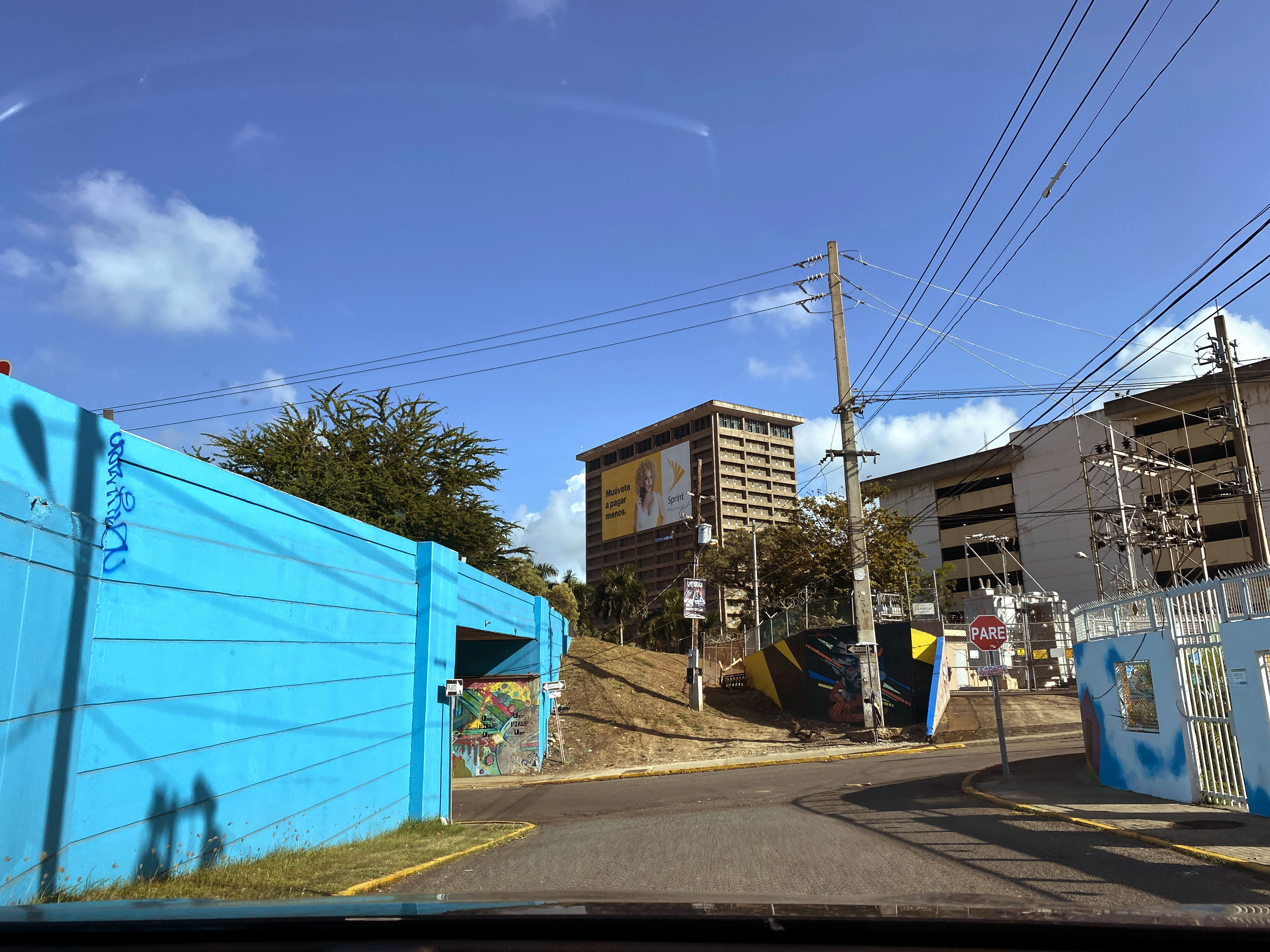
Street in Condadito

== See also ==
- List of communities in Puerto Rico
