= Borinquen (Oriente) =

Coordinates: 18.4272664°N 66.0454760°W

- Subbarrio
- Interactive map of Borinquen
- Commonwealth: Puerto Rico
- Municipality: San Juan
- Barrio: Oriente

Government
  - Type: Borough of San Juan
  - Borough President: Jorge Santini
  - Secretary of Education: Jesús Rivera Sánchez

Population
  - Total: 1,290
- Source: 2010 United States census

Borinquen is one of the 3 subbarrios in the barrio of Oriente in San Juan, Puerto Rico. Its population in 2010 was 1,290.
