= Ubarri (Pueblo) =

Subbarrio of Pueblo in San Juan, Puerto Rico

García Ubarri
- Subbarrio
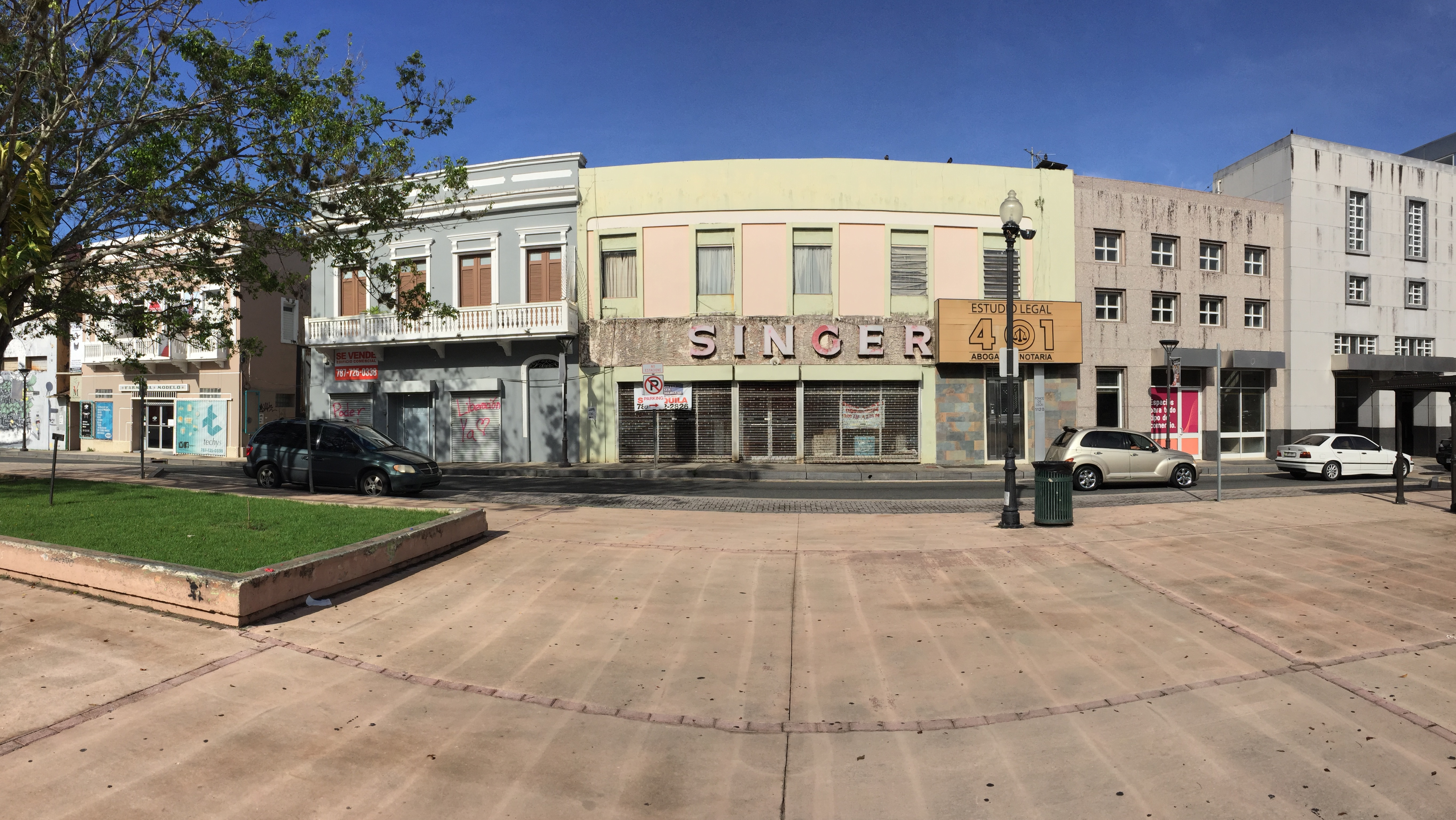
- Avenida Juan Ponce de León in Ubarri

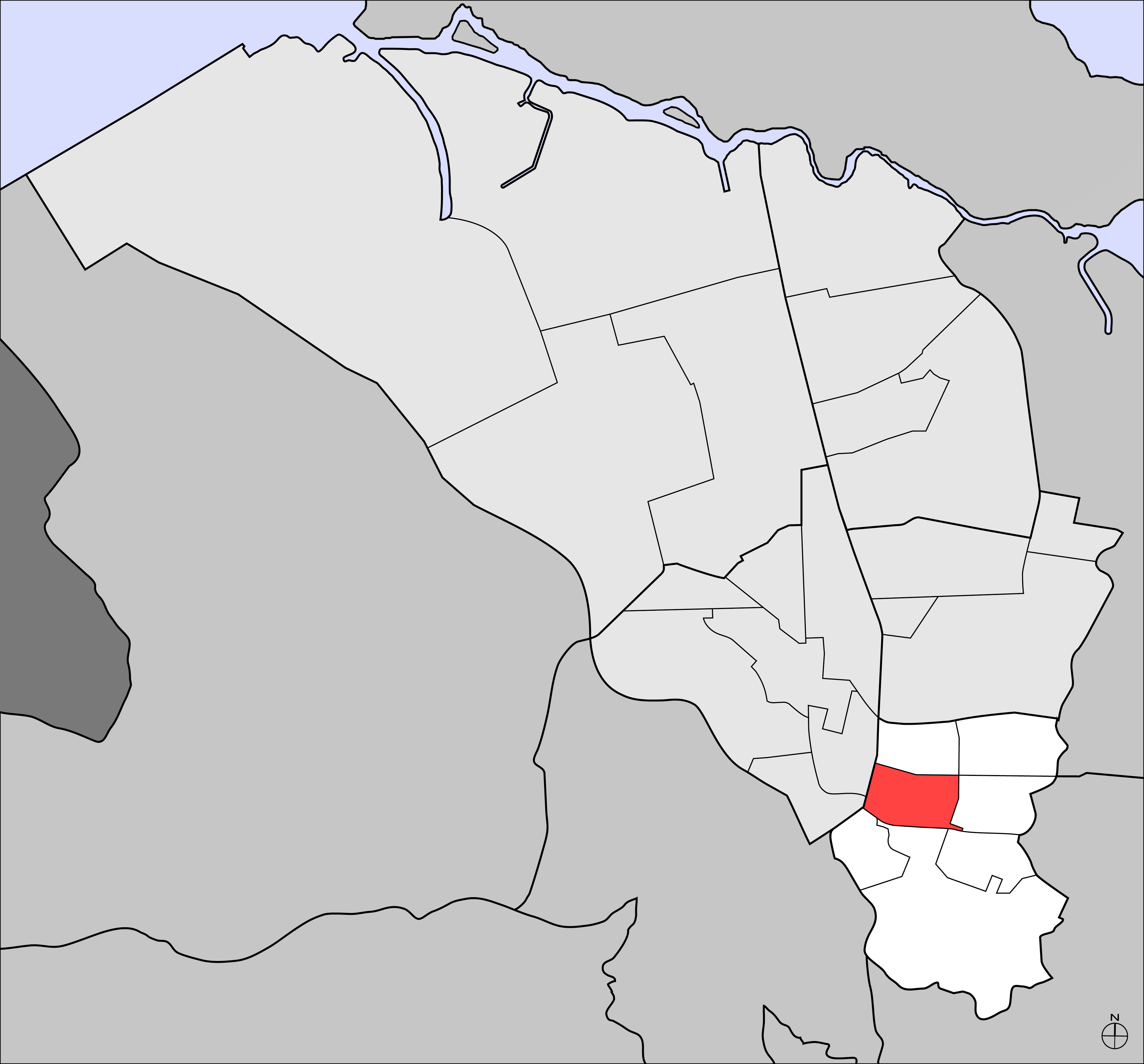

- Location within Puerto Rico
- Coordinates: 18°23′49″N 66°03′01″W
- Commonwealth: Puerto Rico
- Municipality: San Juan
- Barrio: Pueblo

Area
  - Total: .07 sq mi (0.18 km^{2})
  - Land: .07 sq mi (0.18 km^{2})
- Elevation: 108 ft (33 m)

Population (2010)
  - Total: 698
  - Density: 9,971.4/sq mi (3,850.0/km^{2})
- Source: 2010 Census
- Time zone: UTC−4 (AST)

García Ubarri is a subbarrio, a legal subdivision of Pueblo, a barrio in San Juan, Puerto Rico. It was, at one time, a subdivision of Río Piedras, a former municipality of Puerto Rico.
