= Buen Consejo (Pueblo) =

Subbarrio of Pueblo in San Juan, Puerto Rico

- Subbarrio
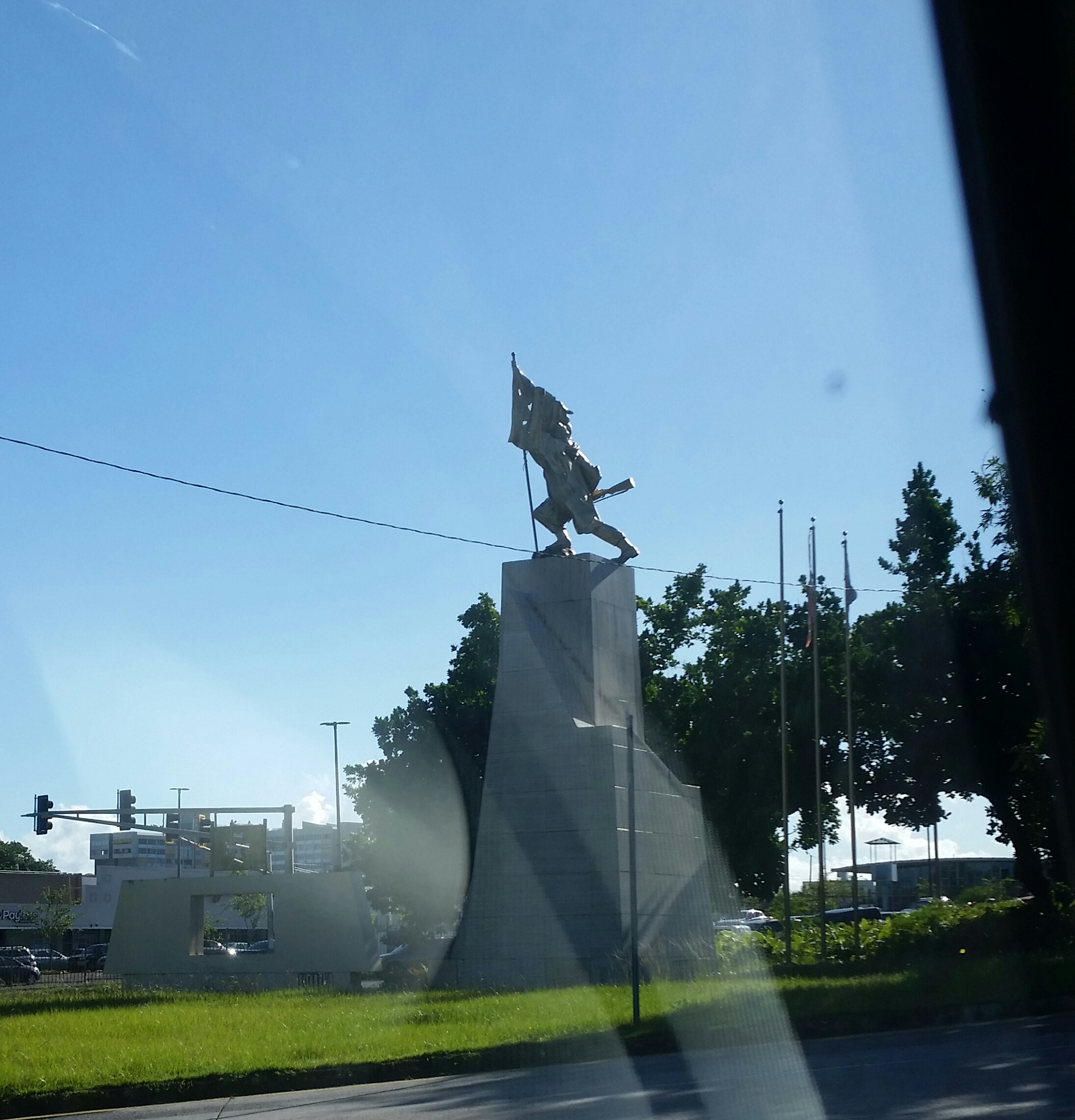
- 65th Infantry Regiment Monument in Buen Consejo

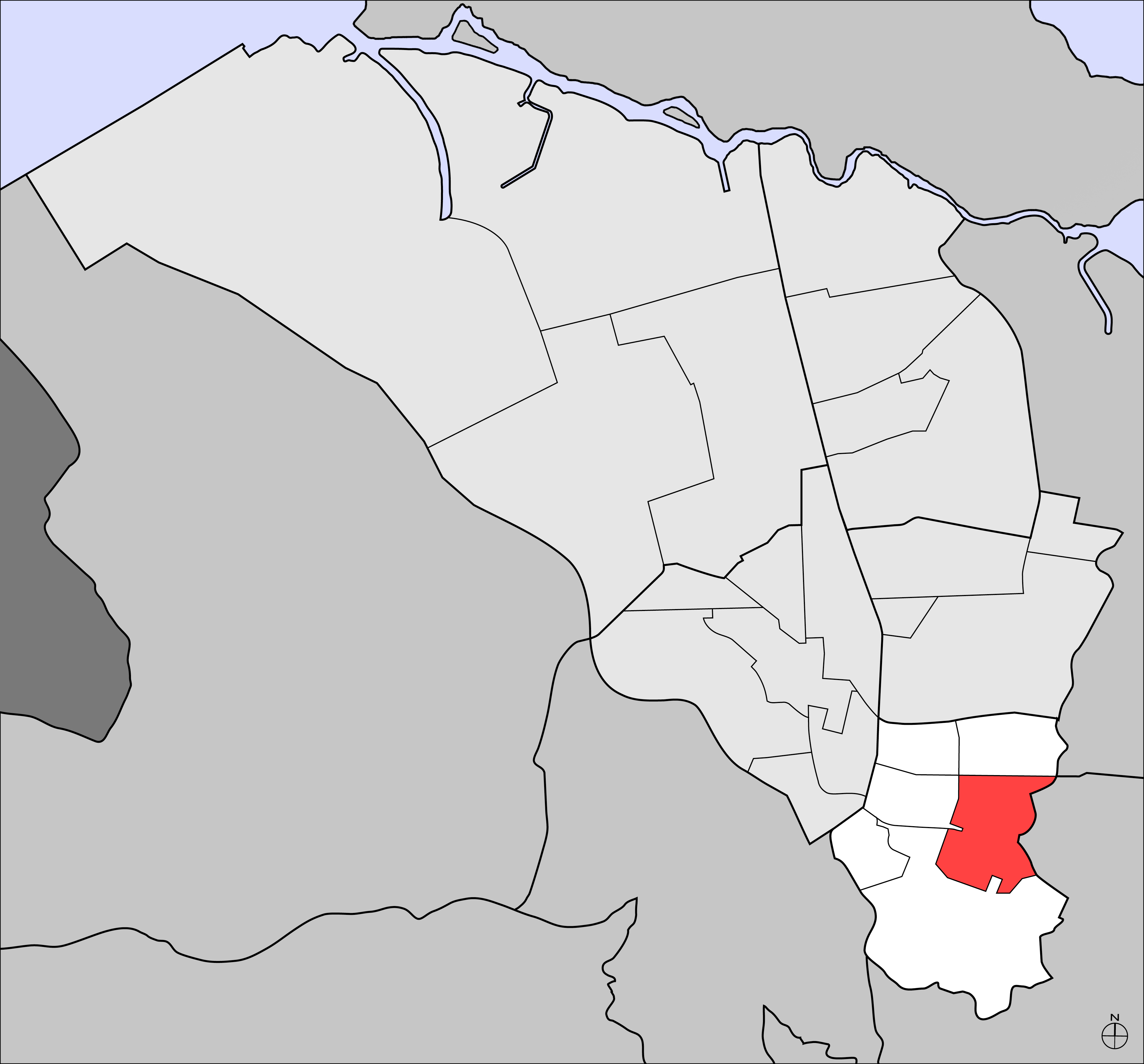

- Location within Puerto Rico
- Coordinates: 18°23′43″N 66°02′44″W
- Commonwealth: Puerto Rico
- Municipality: San Juan
- Barrio: Pueblo

Area
  - Total: .13 sq mi (0.34 km^{2})
  - Land: .13 sq mi (0.34 km^{2})
- Elevation: 141 ft (43 m)

Population (2010)
  - Total: 2,544
  - Density: 19,569.2/sq mi (7,555.7/km^{2})
- Source: 2010 Census
- Time zone: UTC−4 (AST)

Buen Consejo is a subbarrio, a subdivision of Pueblo, a barrio in San Juan, Puerto Rico. It was, at one time, a subdivision of Río Piedras, a former municipality of Puerto Rico.
