= Monte Rey (Pueblo) =

Subbarrio of Pueblo in San Juan, Puerto Rico

- Subbarrio
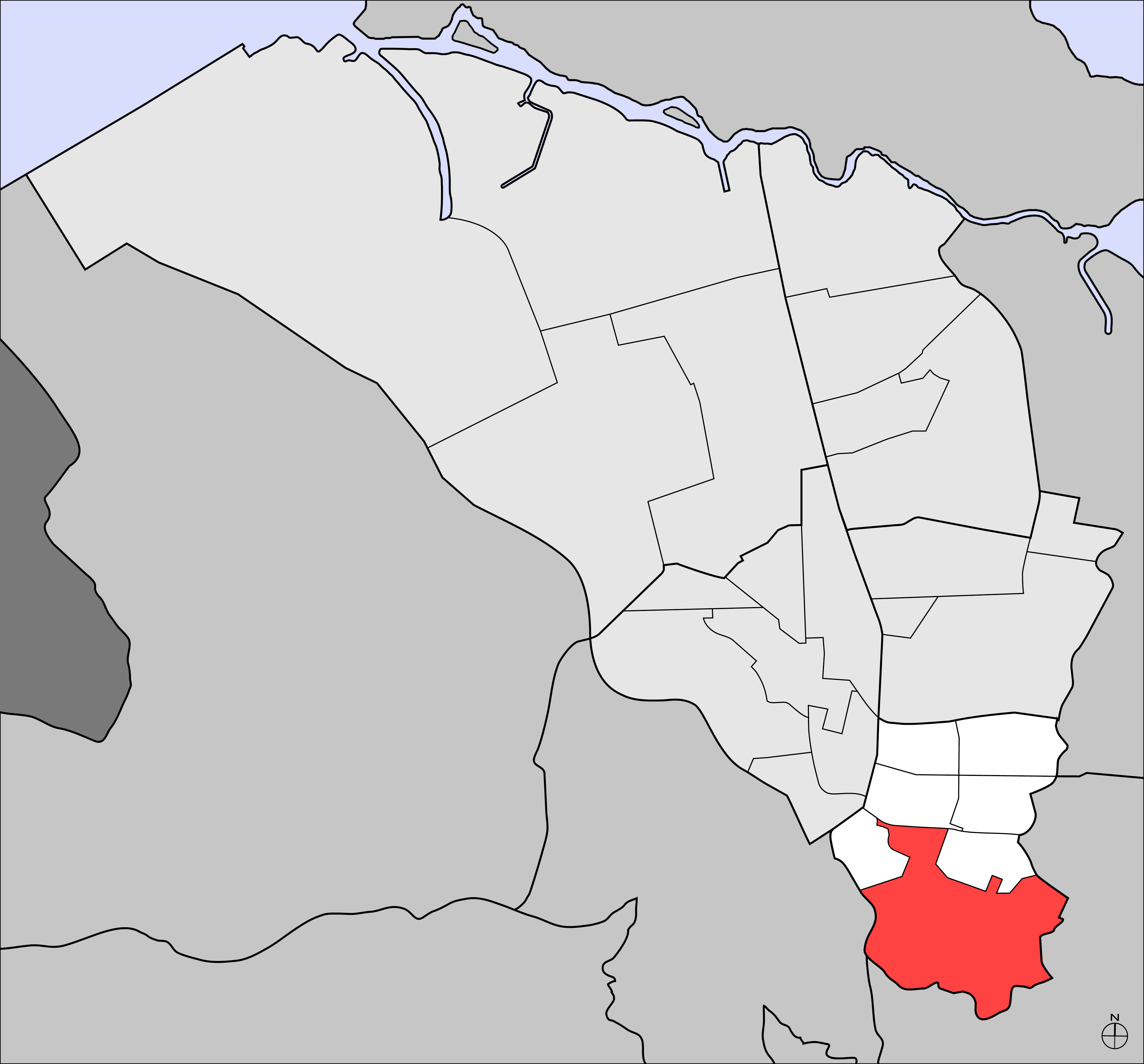

- Location within Puerto Rico
- Coordinates: 18°23′23″N 66°02′51″W
- Commonwealth: Puerto Rico
- Municipality: San Juan
- Barrio: Pueblo

Area
  - Total: .32 sq mi (0.83 km^{2})
  - Land: .32 sq mi (0.83 km^{2})
- Elevation: 239 ft (73 m)

Population (2010)
  - Total: 1,881
  - Density: 5,878.1/sq mi (2,269.5/km^{2})
- Source: 2010 Census
- Time zone: UTC−4 (AST)

Monte Rey is a subbarrio, a legal subdivision of Pueblo, a barrio in San Juan, Puerto Rico. It was, at one time, a subdivision of Río Piedras, a former municipality of Puerto Rico.
