= Pueblo, San Juan, Puerto Rico =

Barrio of Puerto Rico

Pueblo
- Barrio
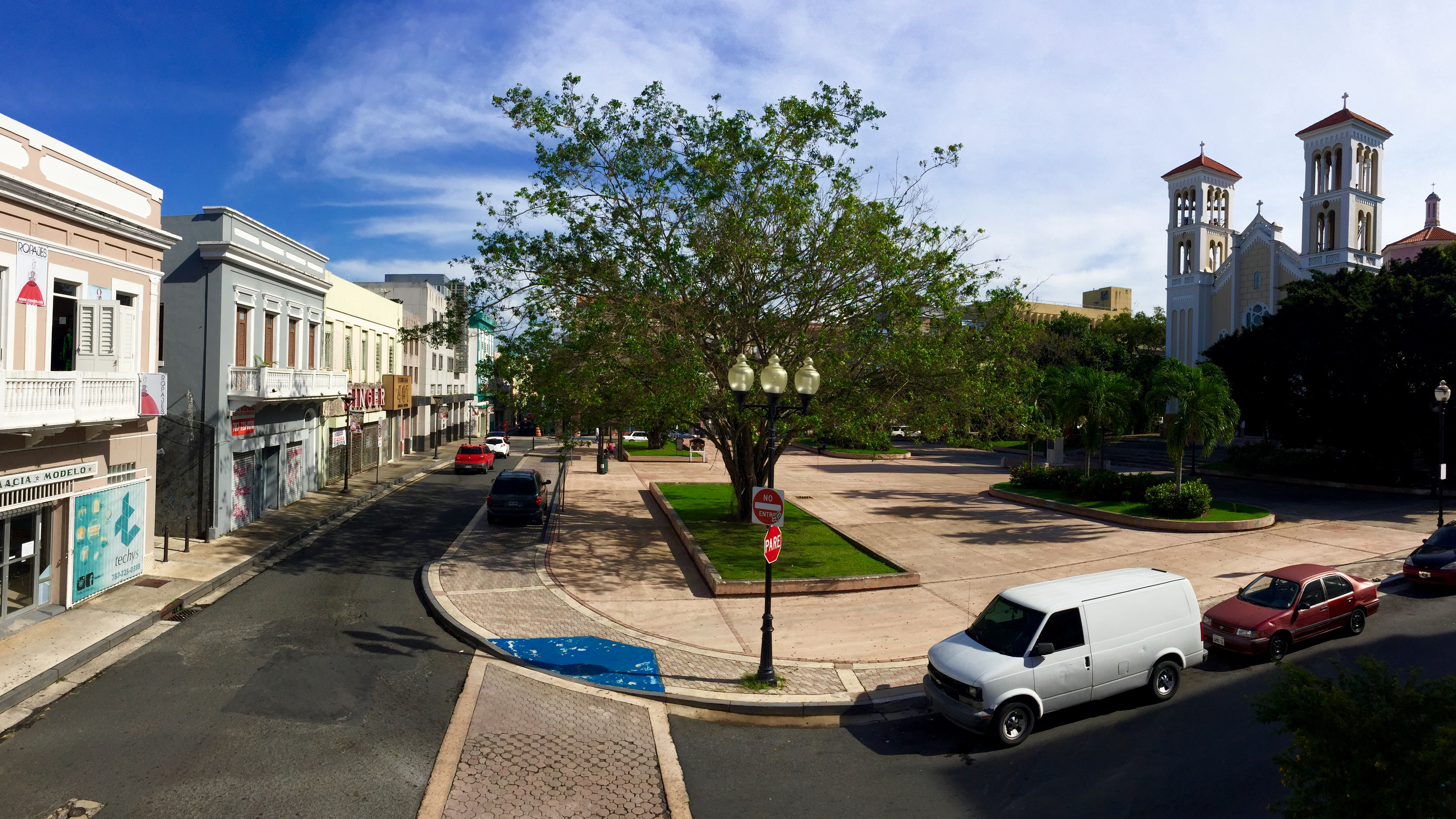
- Plaza La Convalecencia in the main town square.

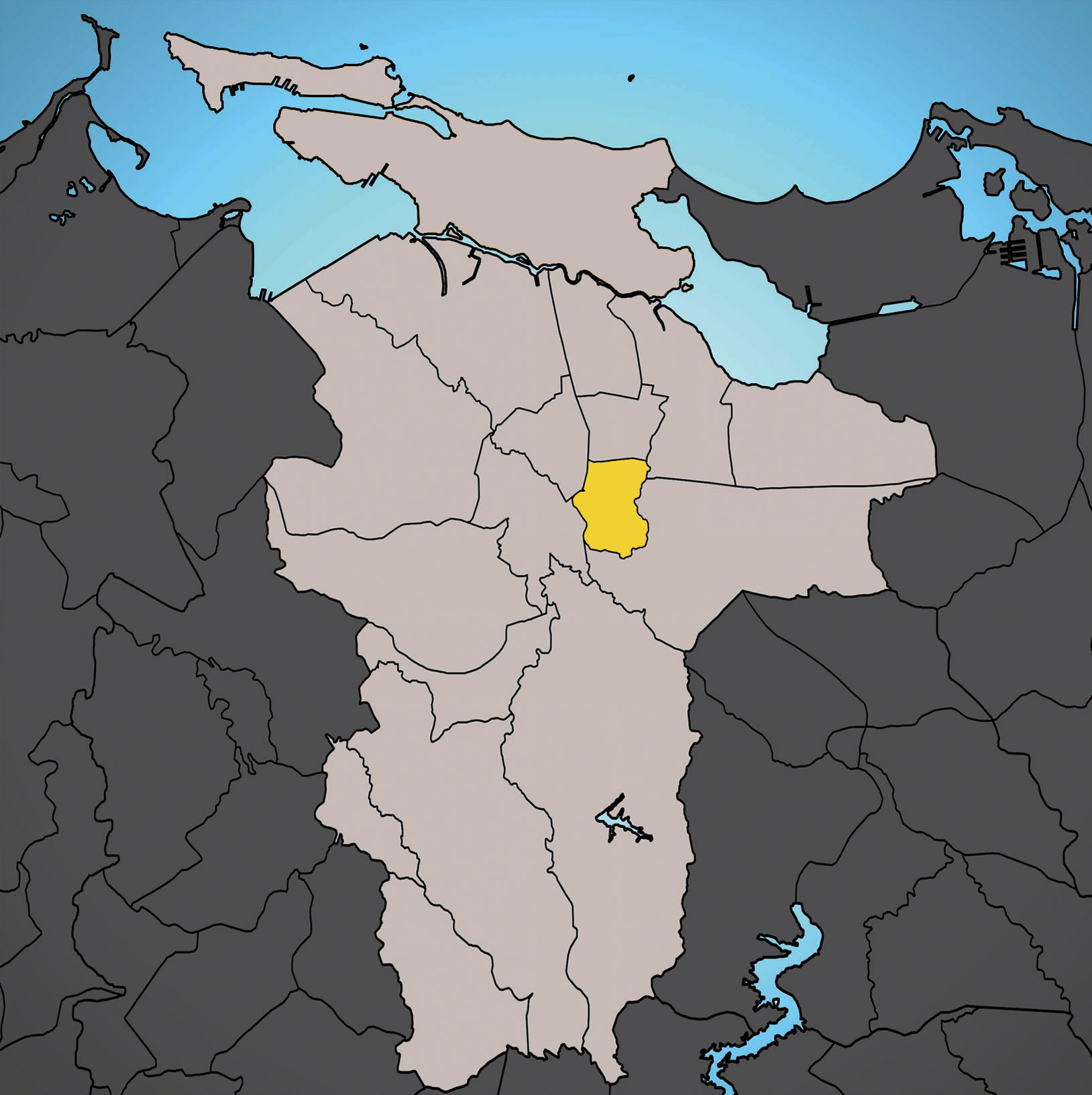
- Location of Pueblo shown in yellow
- Coordinates: 18°23′38″N 66°02′52″W
- Commonwealth: Puerto Rico
- Municipality: San Juan

Area
  - Total: 0.73 sq mi (1.9 km^{2})
  - Land: 0.73 sq mi (1.9 km^{2})
  - Water: 0 sq mi (0 km^{2})
- Elevation: 207 ft (63 m)

Population (2010)
  - Total: 8,720
  - Density: 11,945.2/sq mi (4,612.1/km^{2})
- 2010 census
- Time zone: UTC−4 (AST)

Río Piedras Pueblo (officially just Pueblo, unofficially downtown Río Piedras), is one of 18 barrios in the municipality of San Juan, Puerto Rico. Rio Piedras Pueblo is what used to be the urban center-barrio (downtown district) of the former municipality of Río Piedras until 1951, when the municipality of Rio Piedras was merged with the municipality of San Juan.

Rio Piedras Pueblo is bounded to the west by Hato Rey Sur and El Cinco, with Universidad barrio to the North, and with Sabana Llana Sur barrio to the south and east. It is made up of 6 subbarrios: Buen Consejo, Capetillo, Monte Rey, Río Piedras Antiguo, Ubarri, and Venezuela. The University of Puerto Rico, Rio Piedras is located nearby.

== The central plaza and its church ==
Before the establishment of the town square, the area was the site of the Hermitage of Our Lady of the Pillar since at least 1647. The central plaza, today known as Plaza de la Convalecencia (La Convalecencia Square), dates to 1823 when the town was granted municipality rights. The old city house and Casa del Rey date to this time. Located across the central plaza is the Church of Our Lady of the Pillar, a Roman Catholic church which used to be the main Catholic parish of the former municipality.

== Demographics ==
Historical population
Census	Pop.	Note	%±
1900	2,249		—
1950	22,532		—
1960	19,591		−13.1%
1970	11,296		−42.3%
1980	8,821		−21.9%
1990	8,804		−0.2%
2000	9,391		6.7%
2010	8,720		−7.1%
U.S. Decennial Census; 1899 (shown as 1900) 1910-1930; 1930-1950 1980-2000 2010

In 2010, it had a population of 8,720 residing in land area of 0.73 sq. mi. (1.86 km^{2}).

== Subbarrios ==
Pueblo comprises the following six subbarrios (3rd level subdivisions):

- Buen Consejo
- Capetillo
- Monte Rey
- Río Piedras Antiguo
- Ubarri
- Venezuela

== Gallery ==
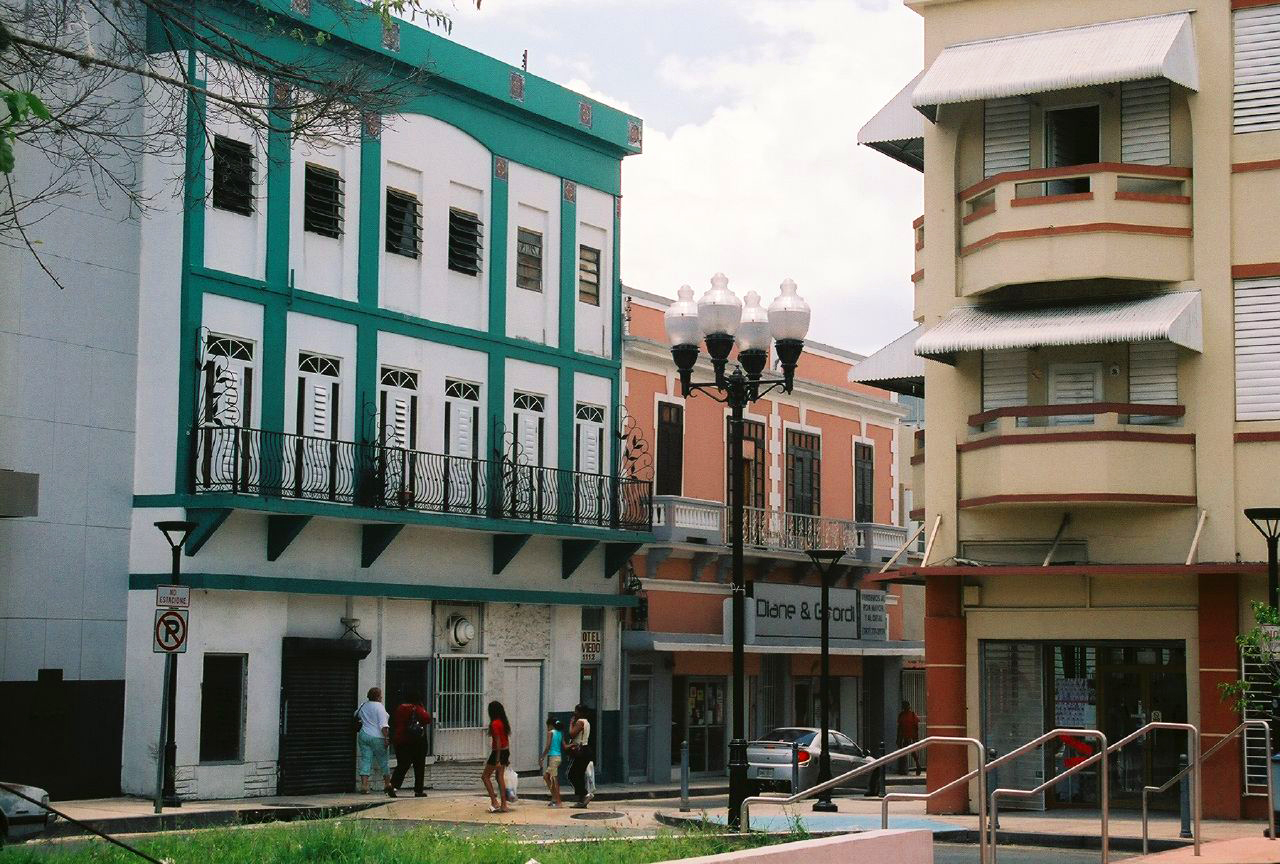
Cityscape of downtown Rio Piedras (Pueblo).

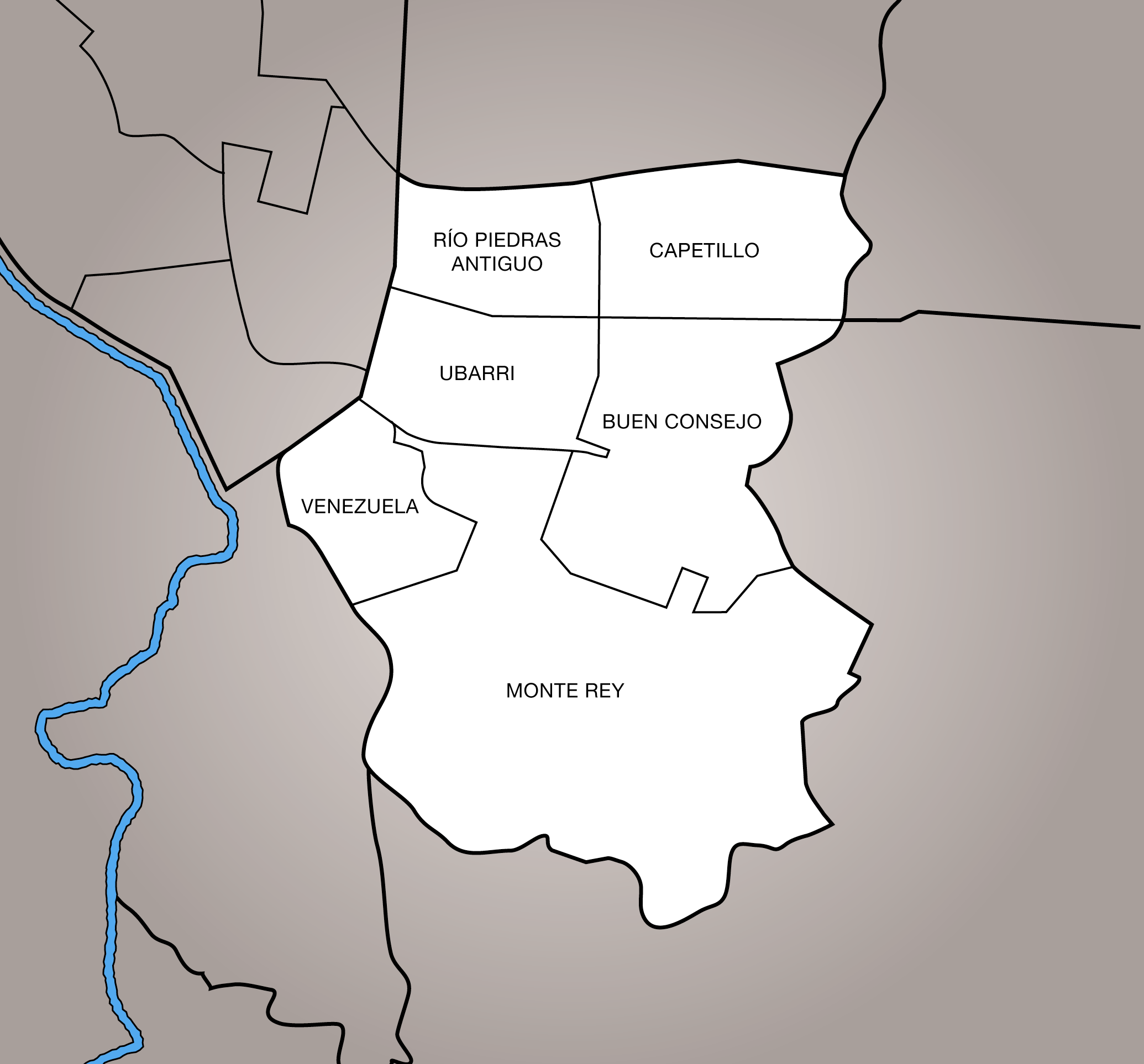
Subbarrios of Río Piedras Pueblo.

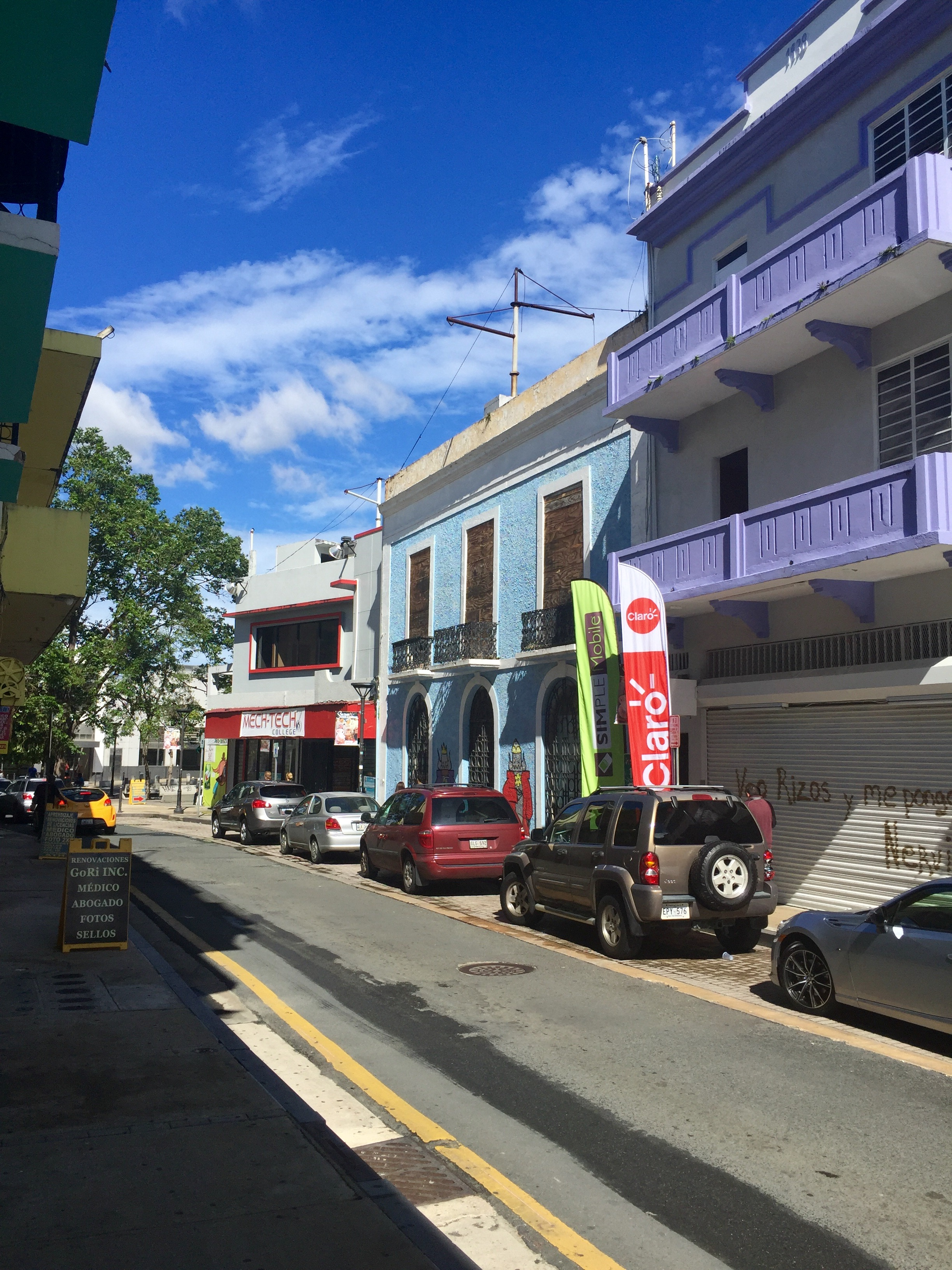
Old city hall of Río Piedras on Juan Ponce de Leon Ave.

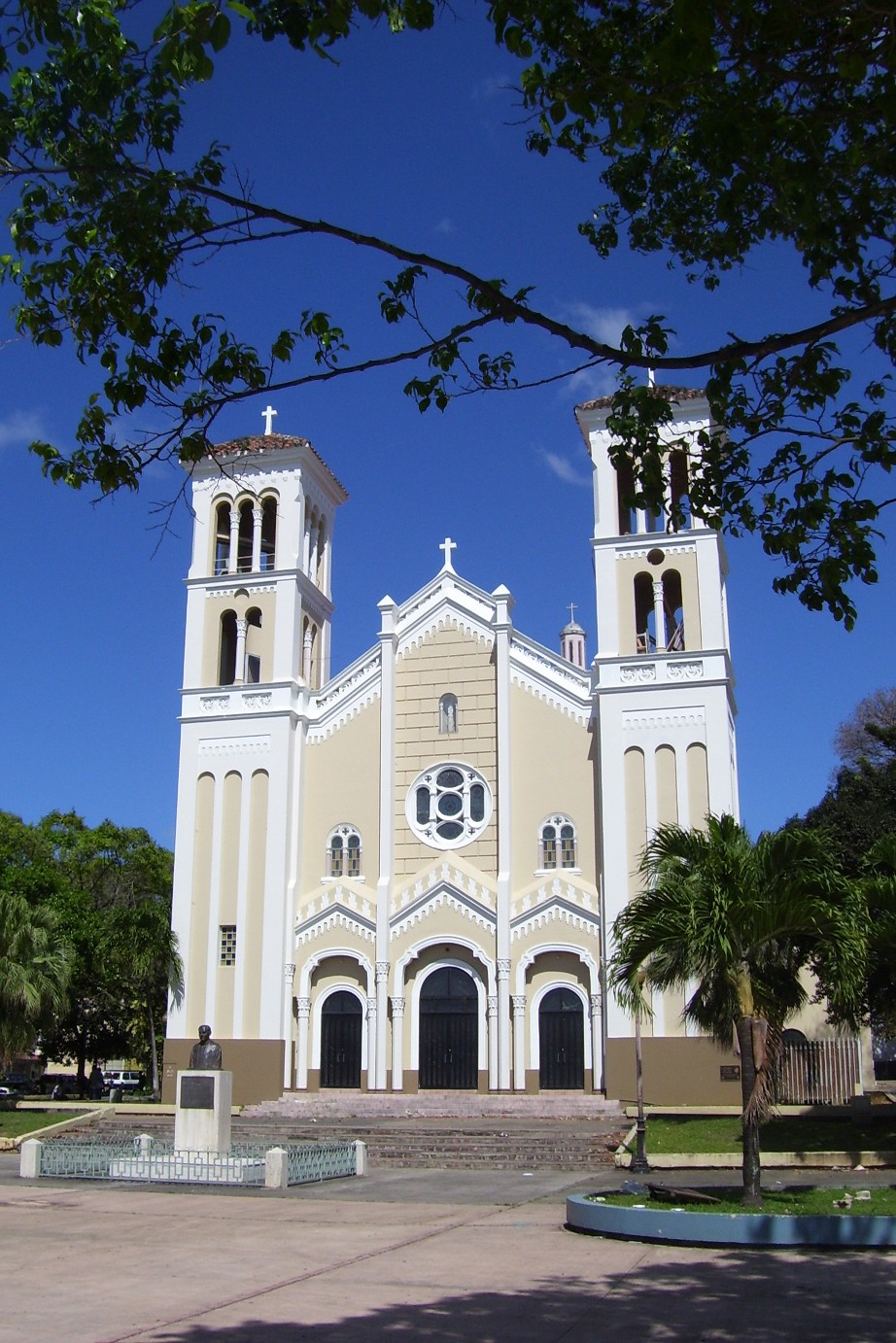
Church of Our Lady of the Pillar today.

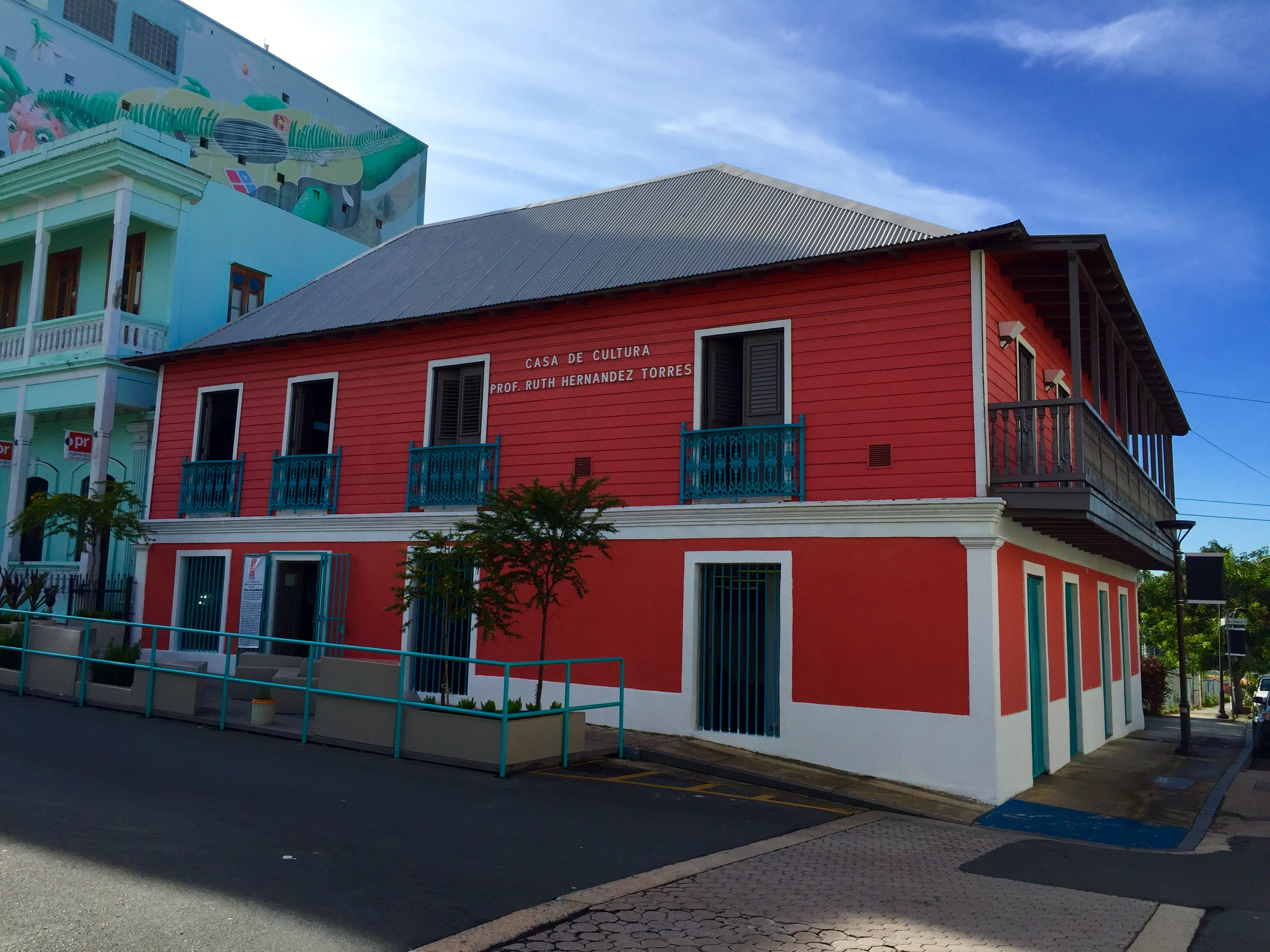
Historic Casa Georgetti, today site of a museum and cultural center.

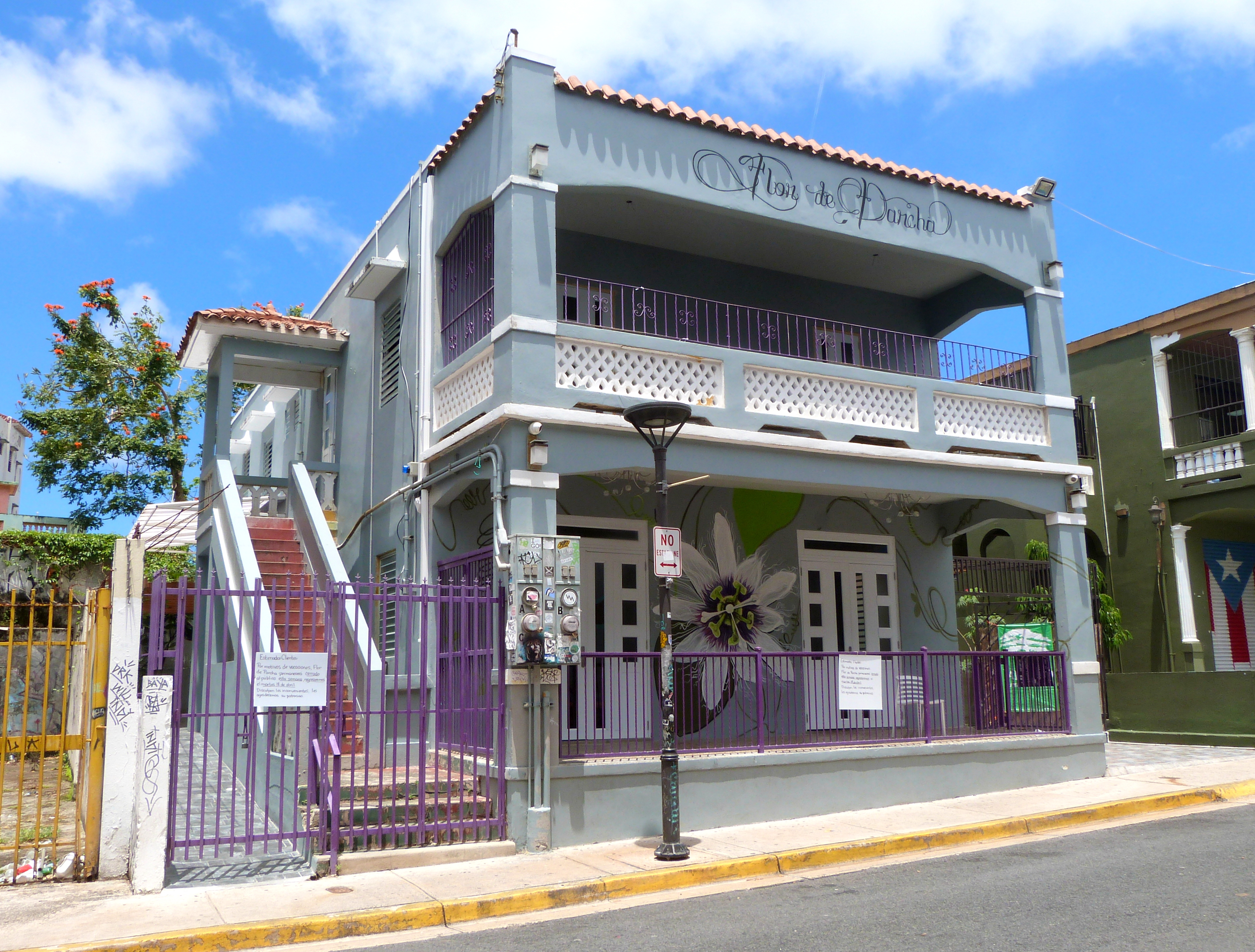
Historic building listed in the National Register of Historic Places since 2016, today referred to as the Puerto Rico Gay Pride Community Building.

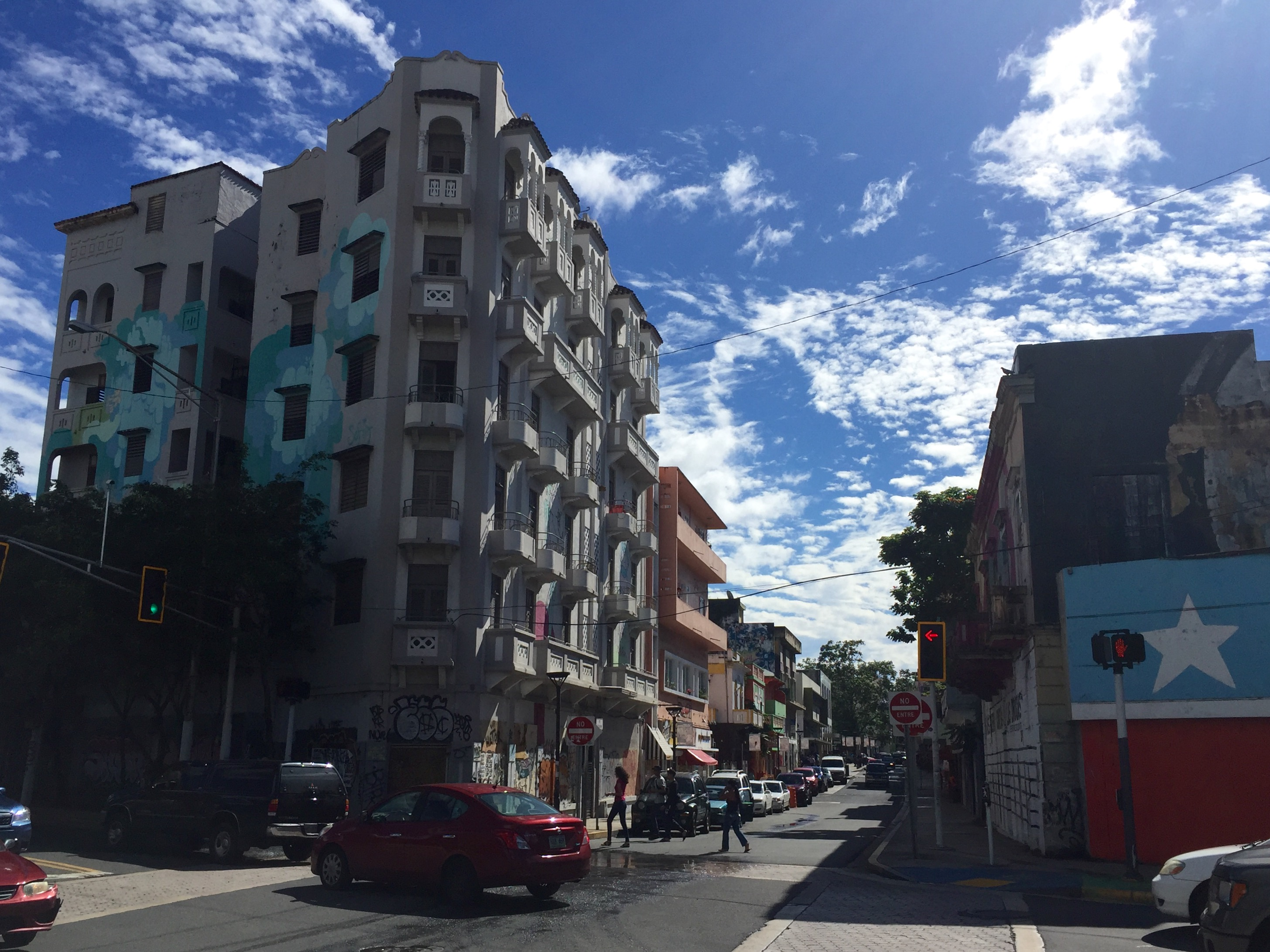
Juan Ponce de León Avenue.

== See also ==
- List of communities in Puerto Rico
