= Río Piedras Antiguo (Pueblo) =

Subbarrio of Pueblo in San Juan, Puerto Rico

- Subbarrio
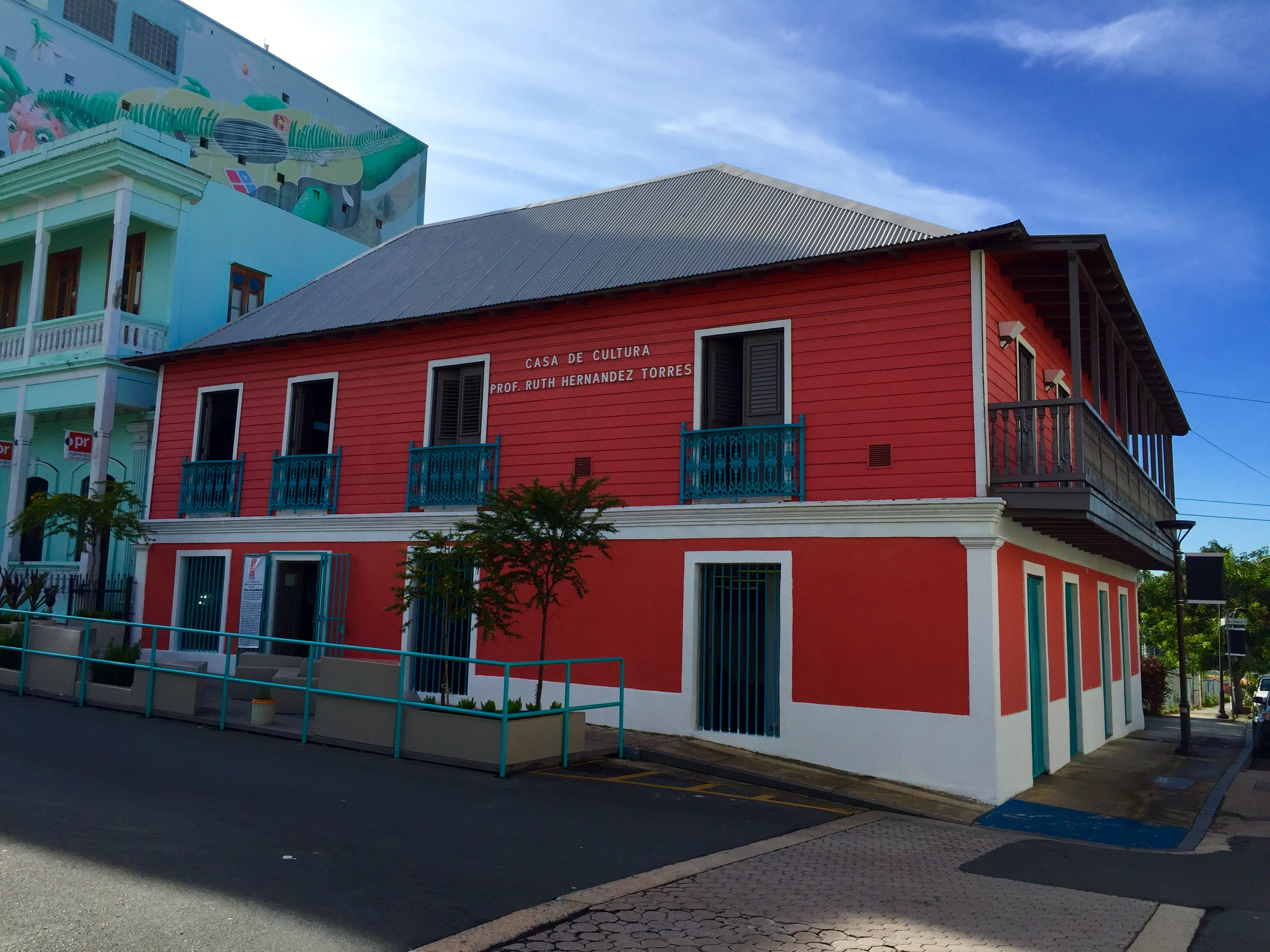
- Casa de Cultura Ruth Hernández Torres

- Location within Puerto Rico
- Coordinates: 18°23′59″N 66°03′00″W
- Commonwealth: Puerto Rico
- Municipality: San Juan
- Barrio: Pueblo

Area
  - Total: .06 sq mi (0.16 km^{2})
  - Land: .06 sq mi (0.16 km^{2})
- Elevation: 98 ft (30 m)

Population (2010)
  - Total: 445
  - Density: 7,416.7/sq mi (2,863.6/km^{2})
- Source: 2010 Census
- Time zone: UTC−4 (AST)

Río Piedras Antiguo is one of the six subbarrios of Pueblo, a barrio in San Juan, Puerto Rico. It was, at one time, a subdivision of Río Piedras, a former municipality of Puerto Rico.

== Gallery ==
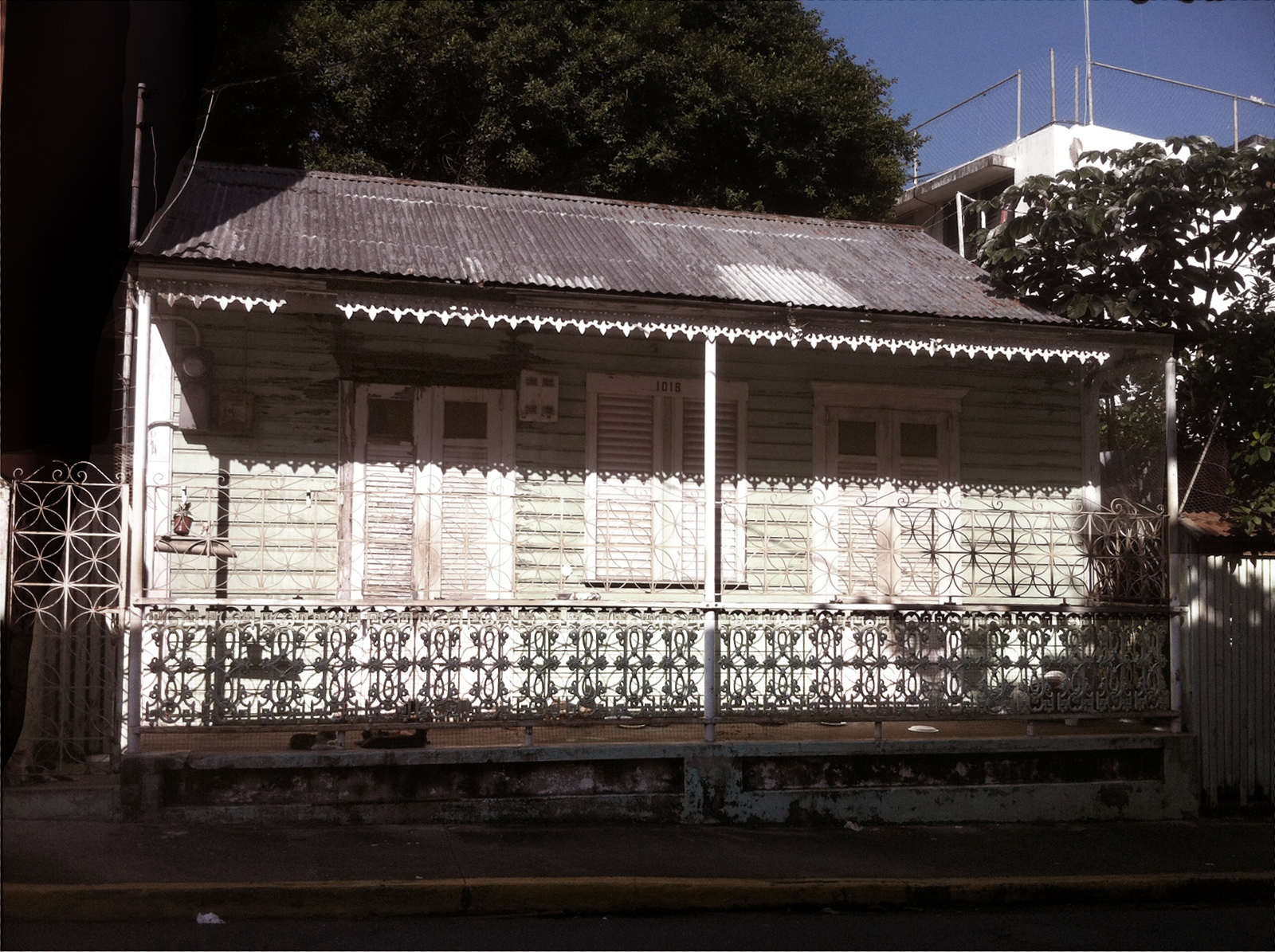
Home on Calle Ferrocarril in Rio Piedras Antiguo

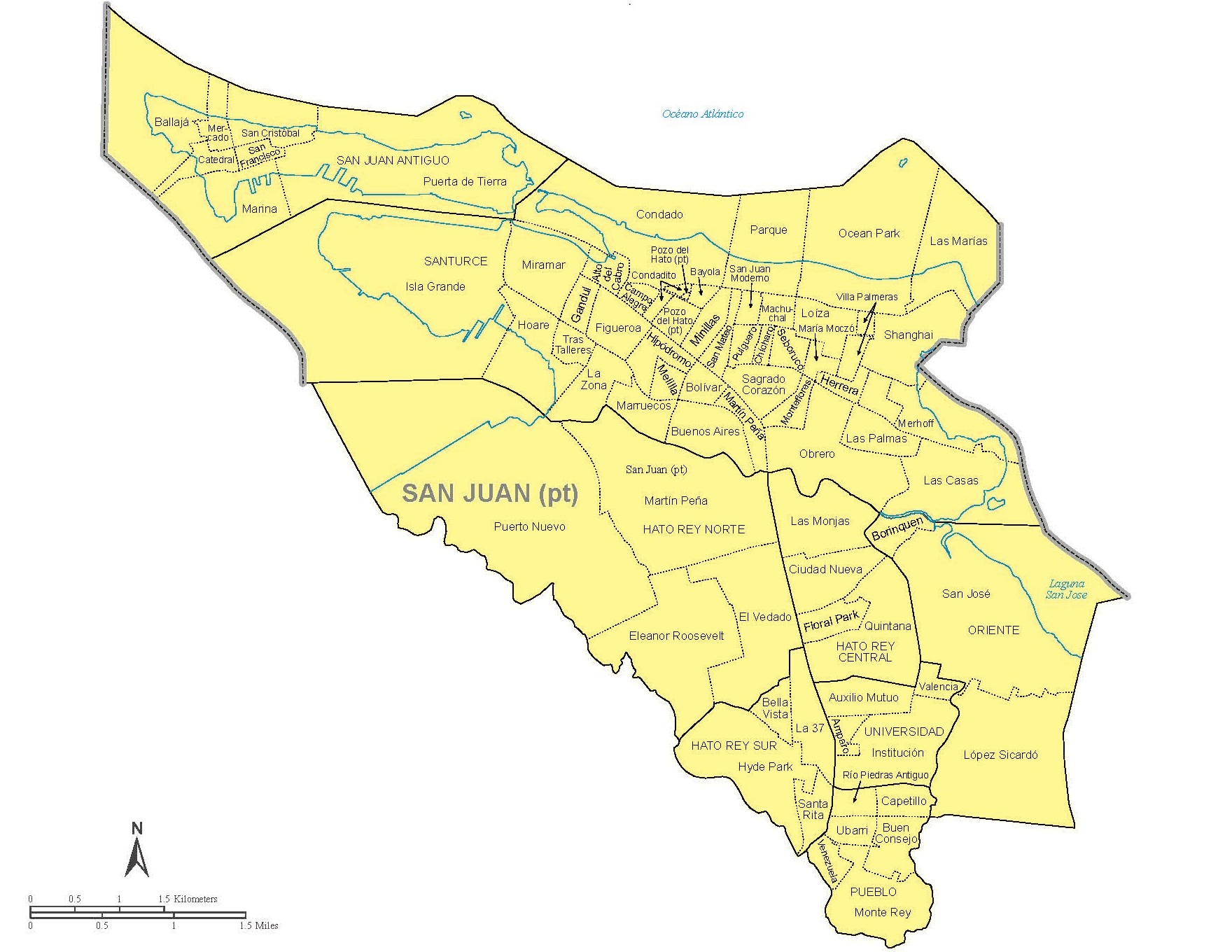
Map of San Juan with Río Piedras Antiguo in the south
