= Capetillo (Pueblo) =

Subbarrio of Pueblo in San Juan, Puerto Rico

- Subbarrio
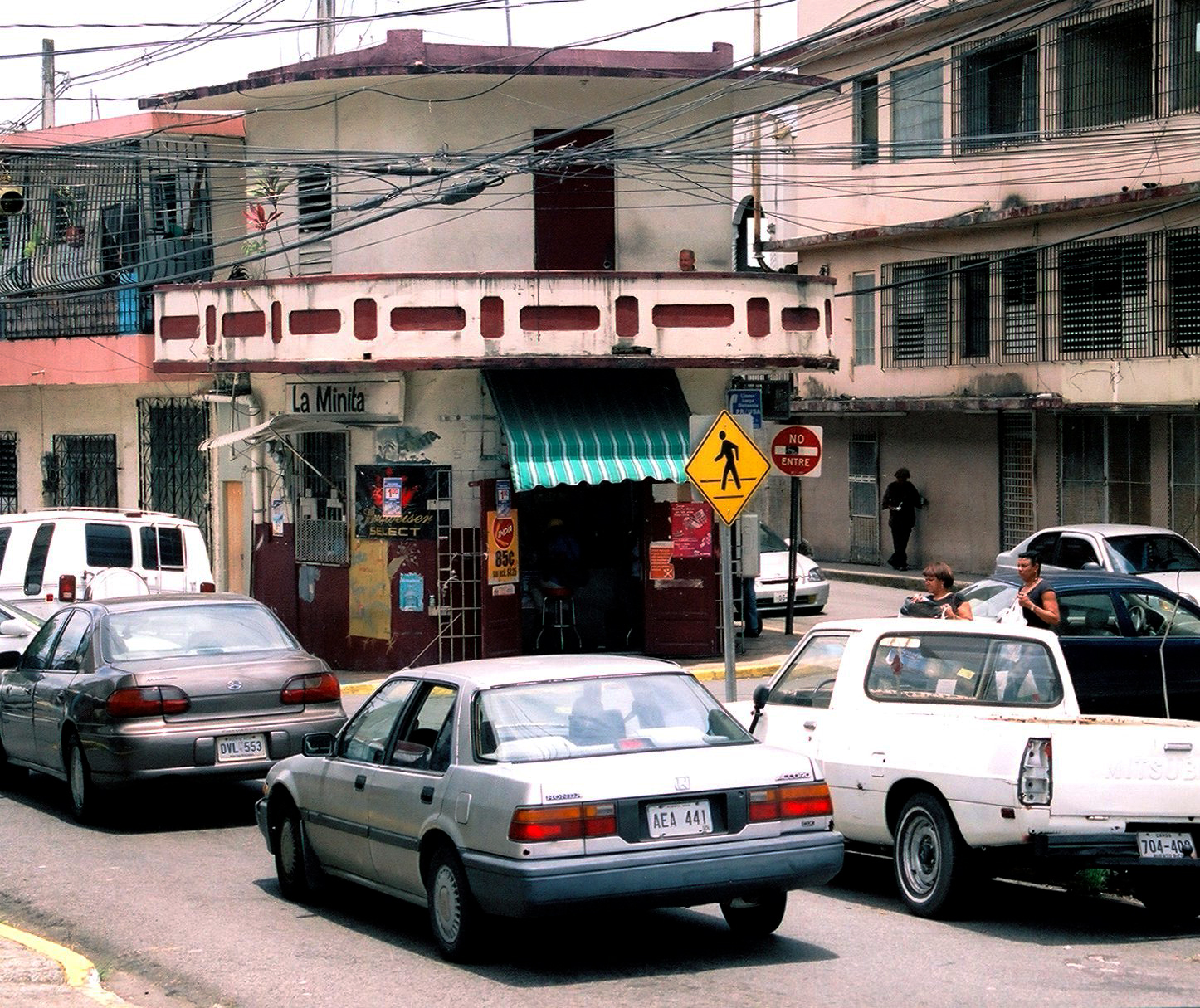
- Streets in Capetillo

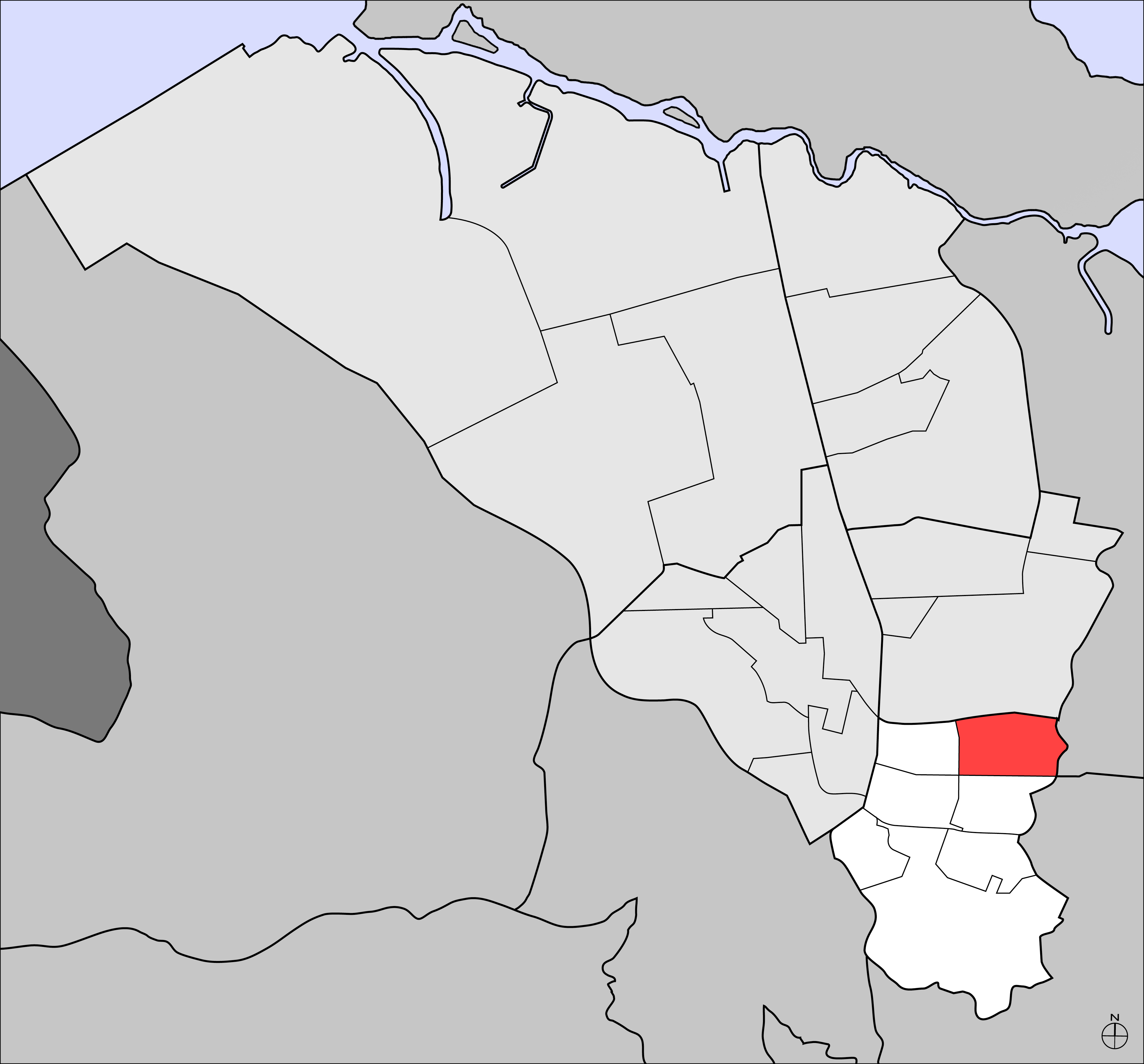

- Location within Puerto Rico
- Coordinates: 18°24′00″N 66°02′41″W
- Commonwealth: Puerto Rico
- Municipality: San Juan
- Barrio: Pueblo

Area
  - Total: .08 sq mi (0.21 km^{2})
  - Land: .08 sq mi (0.21 km^{2})
- Elevation: 75 ft (23 m)

Population (2010)
  - Total: 1,933
  - Density: 24,162.5/sq mi (9,329.2/km^{2})
- Source: 2010 Census
- Time zone: UTC−4 (AST)

Capetillo is a subbarrio, a legal subdivision of Pueblo, a barrio in San Juan, Puerto Rico. It was, at one time, a subdivision of Río Piedras, a former municipality of Puerto Rico.
