= Venezuela (Pueblo) =

Subbarrio of Pueblo in San Juan, Puerto Rico

- Subbarrio
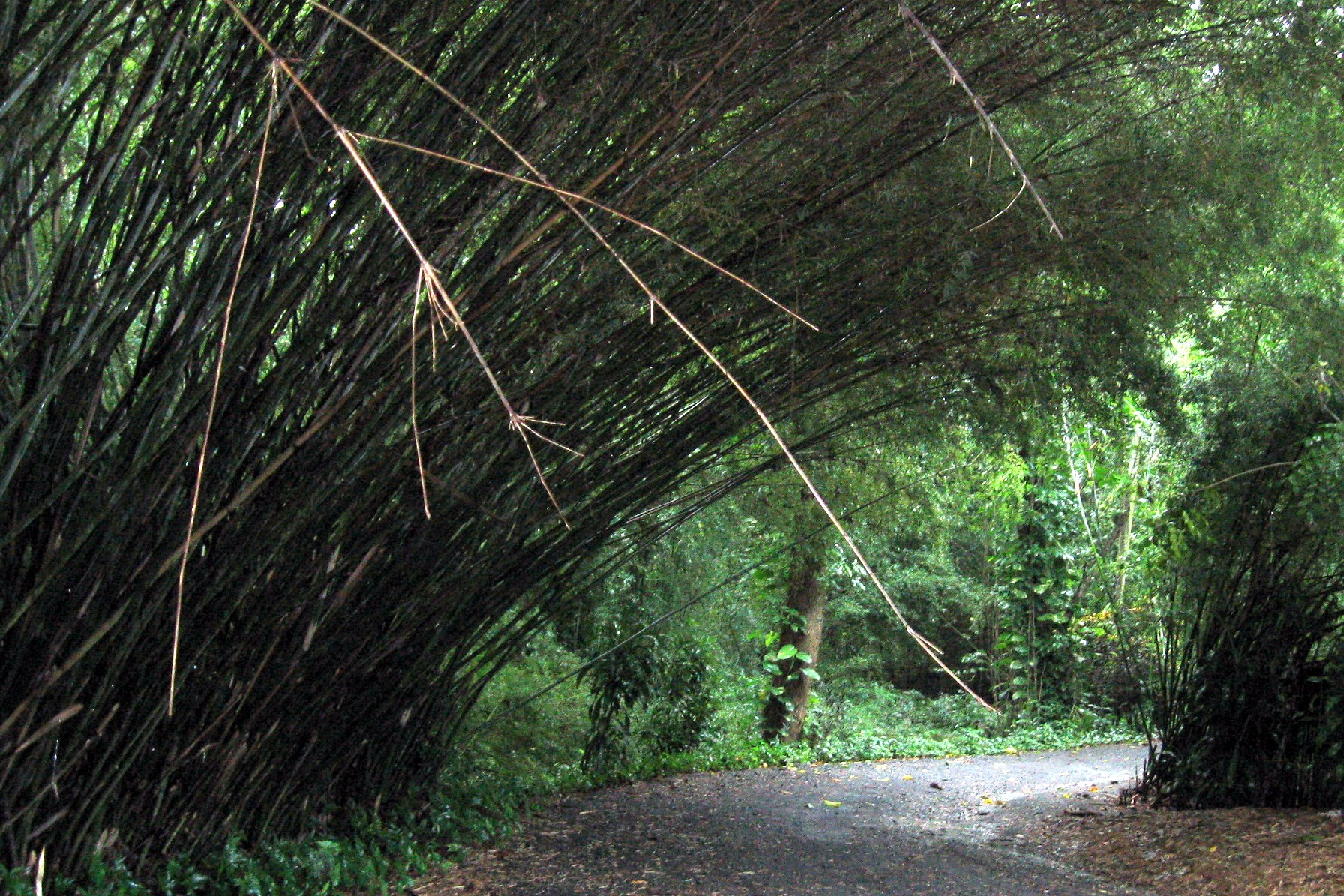
- View of the botanical gardens at UPR in Venezuela

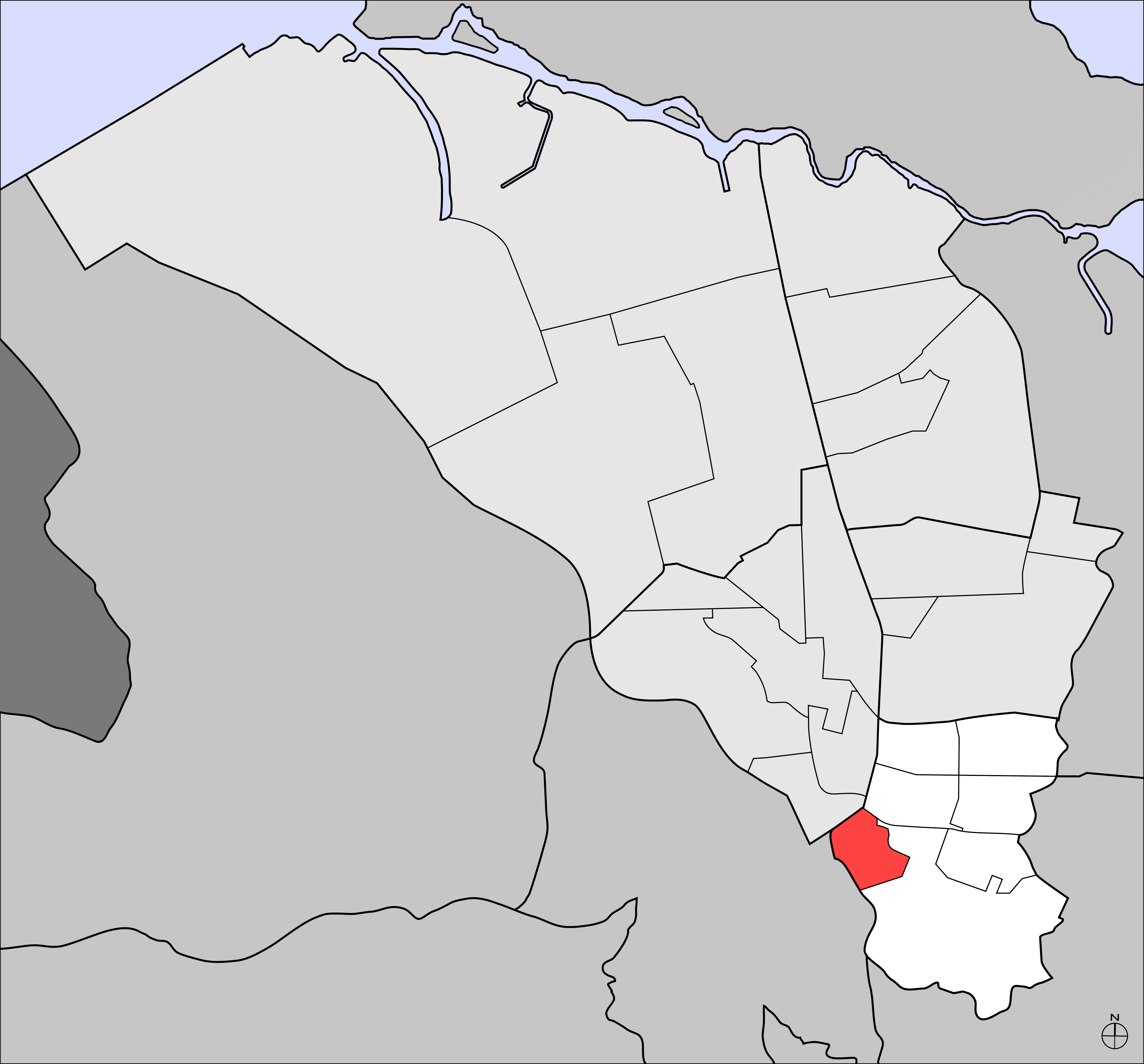

- Location within Puerto Rico
- Coordinates: 18°23′38″N 66°03′10″W
- Commonwealth: Puerto Rico
- Municipality: San Juan
- Barrio: Pueblo

Area
  - Total: .07 sq mi (0.18 km^{2})
  - Land: .07 sq mi (0.18 km^{2})
- Elevation: 118 ft (36 m)

Population (2010)
  - Total: 1,219
  - Density: 17,414.3/sq mi (6,723.7/km^{2})
- Source: 2010 Census
- Time zone: UTC−4 (AST)

Venezuela is one of the six subbarrios of Pueblo barrio in the municipality of San Juan in Puerto Rico. It was, at one time, a subdivision of Río Piedras, a former municipality of Puerto Rico.
