= Human interactions with insects in southern Africa =

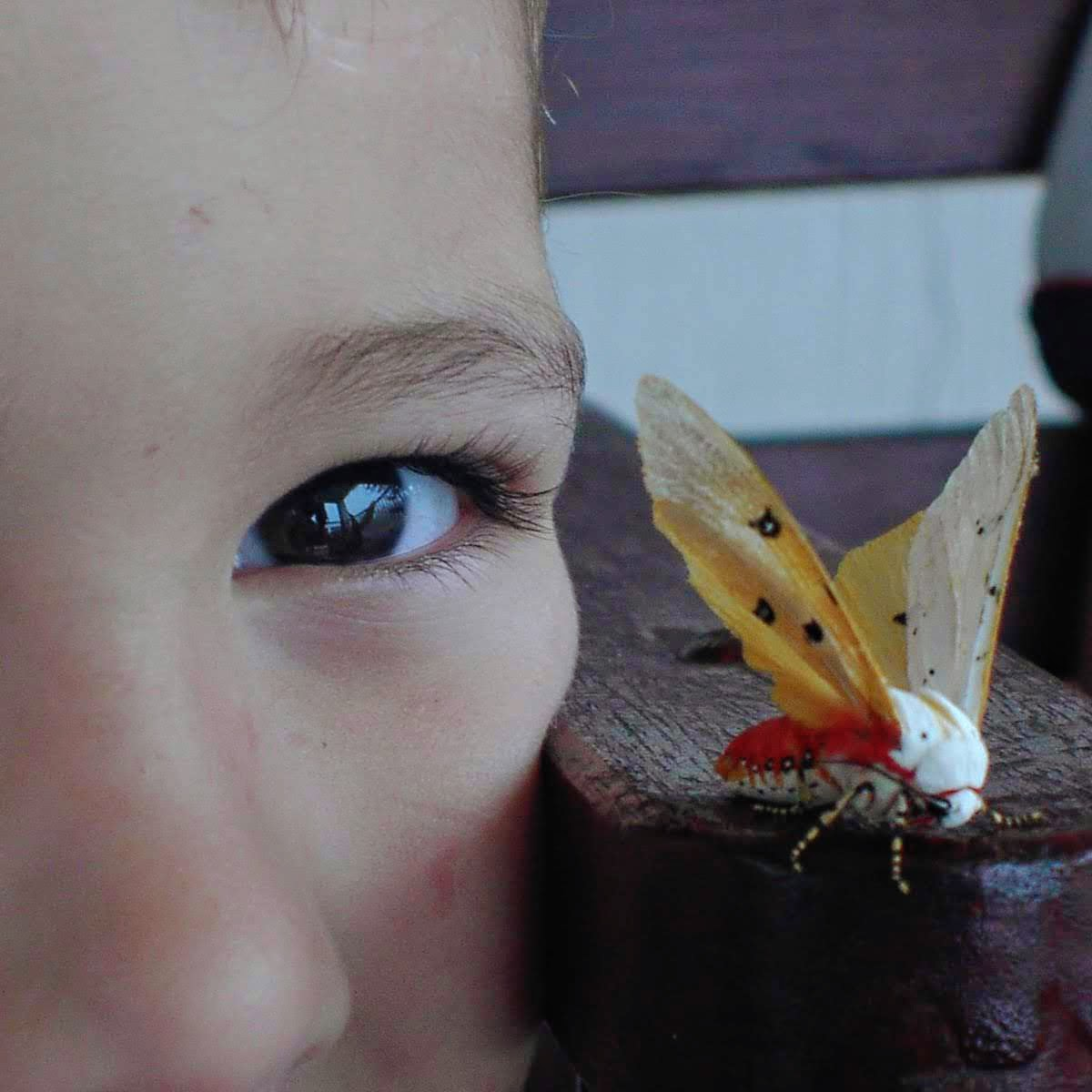
Young African boy intrigued by a bright yellow and red moth.

Various cultures throughout Africa utilize insects for many things and have developed unique interactions with insects: as food sources, for sale or trade in markets, or for use in traditional practices and rituals, as ethnomedicine or as part of their traditional ecological knowledge. As food, also known as entomophagy, a variety of insects are collected as part of a protein rich source of nutrition for marginal communities. Entomophagy had been part of traditional culture throughout Africa, though this activity has been diminishing gradually with the influx of Western culture and market economies. Often the collection of insects for food has been the activity of children, both male and female.

Within Southern Africa different communities have established practices for regulating and maintaining their insect harvests. Some groups, through taboos, ritual, and hierarchical organizational structures acting as regulating bodies, have maintained their traditional practice for centuries. They monitor the development of certain caterpillar species' life cycles to ensure proper time frame for harvesting and sustainability.

Understanding the diversity of relationships to nature is a crucial aspect of fully grasping and contending with the challenges of modernity and ecology. According to the Food and Agriculture Organization of the United Nations report from January 2012, it has been recommended that insects be utilized both for human consumption as well as for animal feed. However, as the climate changes many agencies are reporting on the risk of the decline in insect populations within the larger ongoing phenomenon of biodiversity loss and how it may affect the world's ecology.

== Blouberg, Limpopo ==
Maize is a staple crop of Blouberg, Limpopo. Yet due to the processing methods of removing the germ and pericarp, maize is a poor source of protein which often requires supplementation. Within the Blouberg Region, Limpopo, there are some 30 species of insect which are considered edible, and of those, the caterpillar Hemijana variegata Rothschild (Lepidoptera: Eupterotidae) is considered a delicacy while being nutritionally sound. Depending on how it is prepared, the nutritional values of protein, carbohydrate, fat, and essential vitamins varies. According to B.A. Egan et al. (2014) the fortification of staple cereals with insects would positively affect the protein content of the community's diet, and should be promoted as a healthy alternative to beef.

=== Traditional preparation ===
Hemijana variegata Rothschild are sold in local markets in the village of Ga Manaka. In this market, the caterpillars are collected by locals in the surrounding forests near Blouberg Mountain and transported back for preparation. Local residents report it was important to wash them after collection. They would wash them three times and purge them, before boiling them in salty water for an hour. They are then sun dried until brittle and the hairs are "shaken off by 'winnowing' in a basket or bucket."

=== Nutrition ===
The Hemijana variegata has protein content that exceeds that of more common livestock such as cows or chickens when measured per gram. The energy, and protein content of the caterpillars which had been traditionally dried had been lower than that of oven based drying. The energy content of the caterpillars (552 kcal/100 g.) is greater than that of beef (112 to 115 kcal/100 g), goat meat (96.36 and 101.47 kcal/100 g), and chicken (144 kcal/100 g). The fat content is 20% which is higher than beef or chicken. The vitamin C content was measured at (14.15 mg/100 g.) compared to (30 mg/100 g) in peas and over (90 mg/100 g) in broccoli.

== Venda, South Africa ==
Caterpillars such as Gonimbrasia belina, or mopane, are a staple protein source for the communities of the Northern Province of South Africa (formerly Venda). Caterpillars are one of the many insects that are traded in wide reaching markets (southern Zimbabwe, eastern Botswana and northern provinces of South Africa, formerly known as Transvaal); not only are caterpillars traded in this expansive market, but other species traded include: soldier termites (Macrotermes: Termitidae, Isoptera), green bugs (Encosternum: Tessaratomidae, Hemiptera) and flying termites (Isoptera). Within rural communities still practicing traditional diets, grasshoppers and mopane worms are considered vital in their subsistence economy and the most important insects for nutrition. The amount of caught insects per time spent trapping varies, depending on the level of rainfall predominately, but also different environmental conditions. Within rural communities grasshoppers and locusts are often trapped for personal consumption rather than to be sold within a market.

In the 1996 survey of the community upwards of 70% of rural households reported having consumed grasshoppers regularly, having an estimated daily intake of 14 grams. The practice of collecting grasshoppers for consumption is considered a common activity for young boys and girls, as well as older women, yet not for older men. Grasshoppers are a free source of nutritional food and as such are important for the sustenance of communities marginal to market economies; as much as 2350 tons of grasshoppers were estimated to be harvested over a period of eight months.

=== Language and description ===
Within the Venda language, Tshivenda, in general locusts and grasshoppers share a name, nzie. The stages of the insects life also are distinctly named: nymphs as vhulka, and the pre-adult stages: thathakubi or dengulamukumbi. Researchers had documented approximately 155 vernacular names for varieties of grasshoppers which varied based on the local communities queried, of which most of the respondents were children. Overall, the vernacular names represented 42 species of grasshoppers. There are vivid linguistic descriptors of many varied species of grasshopper, based on appearance, behaviors, habits, location found, or the sound made.

=== Medicinal uses ===
Grasshoppers, or bapu, are used for a variety of ailments, and different preparations have different medicinal properties according to the ethnomedicine of the communities studied. Some examples are: when bapu is fried, it is to be eaten as a treatment for young children who wet the bed; when bapu is dried and ground up and put in warm water it is used to treat nightmares; boiled bapu is for hyperactive children; ground and then burnt bapu mixed with petroleum jelly is applied to the fontanel of newborns to strengthen them; the ashes of roasted bapu is rubbed onto women's breasts to alleviate pain.

=== Beliefs ===
Some species of grasshopper are for various reasons thought of to be inedible or dangerous. Besides being inedible, there are beliefs associated with the consumption of certain grasshoppers, such as those that are attracted to fire, which may lead to madness or the loss of one's hearing. Losing one's sanity is a persistent fear associated with eating grasshoppers that live near one's house. Other such forbidden species are silivhindi and banzi (Pyrgomorphldae) which have a distinctly bad odor and are thought to be toxic to both humans and dogs. Within Zionist African Churches, many insects such as grasshoppers and locusts are thought of us unclean, and this translates into a stigma against eating those for fear of association.

Several species are believed to become a snake if certain practices are not followed. For instance, mutotombudzi (Acrida spp., Truxalis spp.) requires that you remove the antenna, or nzie-luvhele (Cyrtacanthracris fatarica) must be squashed in a specific manner. The folklore associated with nyammbeulwana is that it could cause one to lose their hair or blood if it were to land on your head. Because of the belief that tshikwandavhokopfu ("powder eater") often eats human and cow feces some do not eat it. Other species have foul tastes or are associated with snakes which often leads to their not being eaten.

== Zambia ==
=== Bisa people ===
The Bisa people inhabit the Kopa area of Mpika district of northern Zambia (latitude, 11° 00'–13° 30' south; longitude, 29° 45'–32° 30' east). These people practice traditional subsistence farming, hunting and caterpillar collection, which is essential to their culture. K.J. Mbata, et al. (2002) conducted a household survey in 2000 to better understand their customs and knowledge concerning caterpillar harvesting. Upwards of 89.1% of respondents practiced caterpillar harvesting in the surrounding miombo woodlands. The two most well-known species for harvesting in this region of the eight said to live there were Gynanisa maja Strand (chipumi) and Gonimbrasia zambesina Walker (mumpa). Mostly due to their size, flavor, common lack of thorns or urticating hairs, and their market value, Gynanisa maja is the most popular. The Bisa people believe that the caterpillars have been with them since time immemorial, as gifts from god, and this respectful belief has helped them formulate sustainable traditional management systems.

==== Traditional ecological knowledge ====
The traditional ecological knowledge of the life cycles and harvesting practices have been taught through oral education and shared experiences over centuries, developed in interaction with their local environment. The Bisa identify caterpillar species in various ways, among them the sound that the caterpillars make while eating and on which plants they feed. They have an understanding of the life cycles of the harvested caterpillars, recognizing the stages: egg, larva, pupa, and then adult. Through early September to late October the caterpillars oviposit, and then harvesting is done during the rainy season between November and April. Taboos and specific seasonal management for harvest are some regulatory mechanisms practiced by the Bisa to teach proper traditional hunting behavior, to protect the maturation process and life cycle of the caterpillar, and to ensure the sustainability of the caterpillar and health of the ecosystem.

Traditional technologies protect the habitat of the caterpillars, such as the use of fire to prevent natural blazes from consuming the host trees.

==== Ritual and beliefs ====
The monitoring process of the Bisa people of the caterpillars are often reproduced and learned through ritual behavior, performed by members of the senior chief kopa royal establishment. These rituals act as a regulator for the harvesting of the caterpillar and involve many layers of the community. The village scouts will walk through the woodlands daily and will report the location of eggs within their chiefdom back to the senior chief of the chiefdom. In one such practiced ritual to thank the ancestral Bisa spirits for the edible caterpillars, the senior chief's assistant (chilukuta) places a white cloth in the shrine for the burial site of the senior chiefs (chaipinda). The white cloth is cut into two parts, half of it is to stay at the shrine while the other is cut into smaller pieces. Believed to bless the developing caterpillars, the smaller pieces are used by the chief's male grandchildren to mark the host plants.

As the eggs begin to hatch, the monitors will gather several to present to the chief who will convene a meeting of himself, his adviser and sub-chiefs, and his senior wife. The chief's wife (mukolo-wa-chalo or "mother-of-the-land"), will offer the young caterpillars to the ancestral Bisa spirits at the shrine (babenye) in a ritual known locally as Ukuposela. Once the caterpillars have begun reaching maturity and samples have been brought by monitors to the senior chief, another meeting is called and more caterpillars are offered up by the senior wife, who following the offering eats the caterpillars that were not offered. A third meeting is called to set up a harvesting date in which the wife does not participate, though representatives from buyers outside the chiefdom may be invited. In another meeting a price is set for caterpillar harvests, and no outside representative participates.

The Bisa people have established rules and taboos for harvesting, such as a stoppage directive issued by the senior chief. The signal for the beginning of harvesting generally is the beginning of November and the signal to stop given around mid-December. Other taboos and associated beliefs are: collecting caterpillars before or after the signals are believed to lead to those involved getting lost, its forbidden to roast them in an open fire or eviscerate them with a knife, noisy or sexual behavior is forbidden while harvesting, and consuming young caterpillars would make people go insane.
