= La Placita de Santurce =

Historic sector and neighborhood of Santurce, San Juan, Puerto Rico

Coordinates: 18.45058°N 66.07062°W

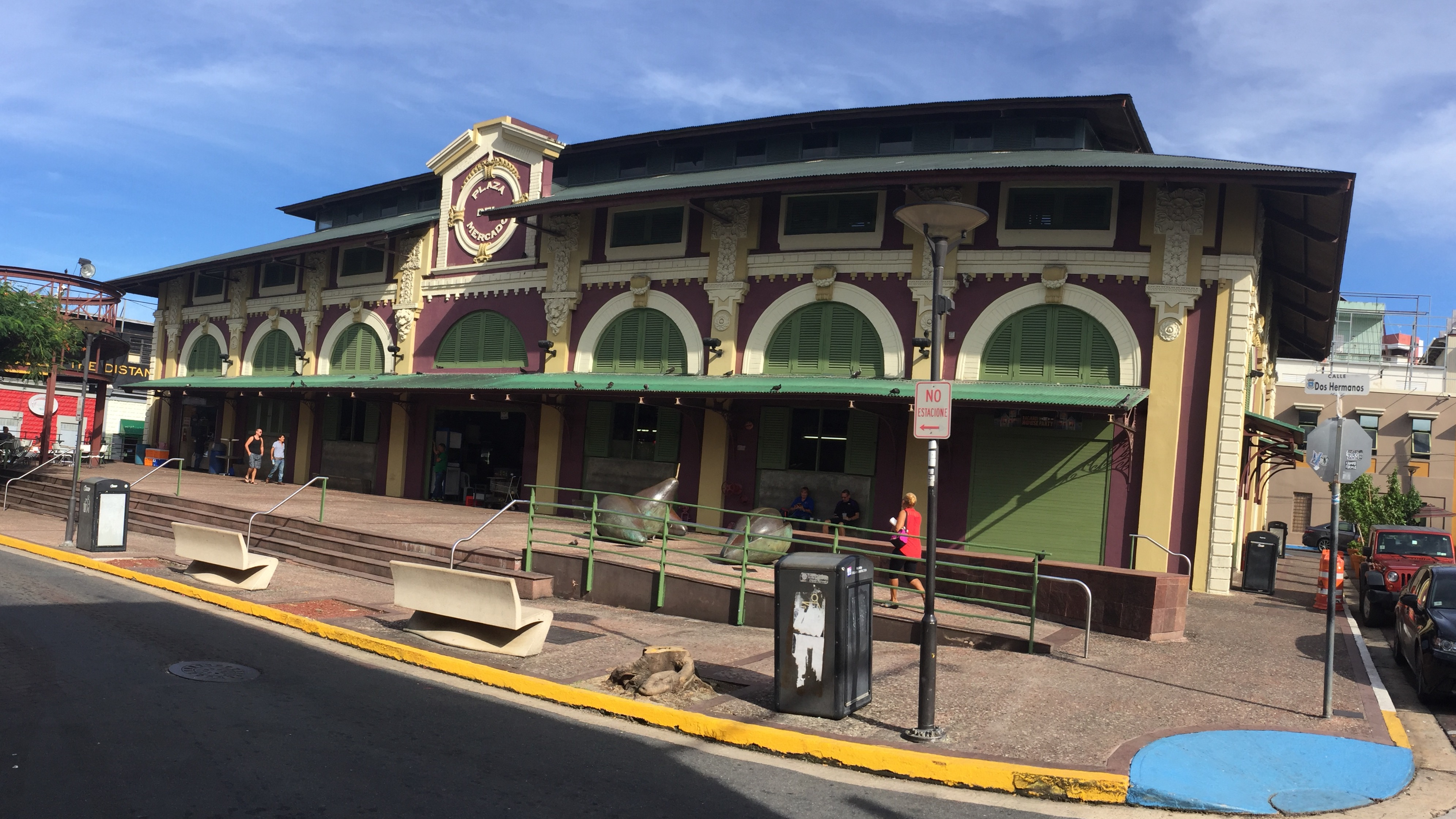
La Placita is located in and around the historical Santurce Market building

La Placita is a historic sector and neighborhood of Santurce, San Juan, Puerto Rico, located in the former area of Santurce's old market square (Spanish: Plaza del mercado de Santurce) in Campo Alegre. La Placita today is a popular dining and nightlife destination in San Juan, while still functioning as a produce and food market during the day.

== History ==
The market square was established in 1910 when the area was selected by Puerto Rico's government to build a marketplace. The marketplace building had two levels, the first one for kiosks, food and produce stalls and other service businesses, while the second level had the butcher and the meat market. The building originally also had business spaces, including medical offices. The market square building has been renovated and modified on numerous occasions throughout the 20th century, and at some point the second level was demolished to increase the area of the main marketplace. The marketplace lost its importance in the later second half of the 20th century which left the area in various stages of disrepair. The building and the neighborhood were revitalized in the 1990s and 2000s when numerous restaurant and entertainment businesses opened. The area is now one of the liveliest social districts in San Juan and it is famous for its nightlife and gastronomy with its numerous restaurants, cafés, bars and dance clubs.

During the day La Placita de Santurce is a farmer's market. It is located about ten minutes walking distance from the Puerto Rico Museum of Contemporary Art.

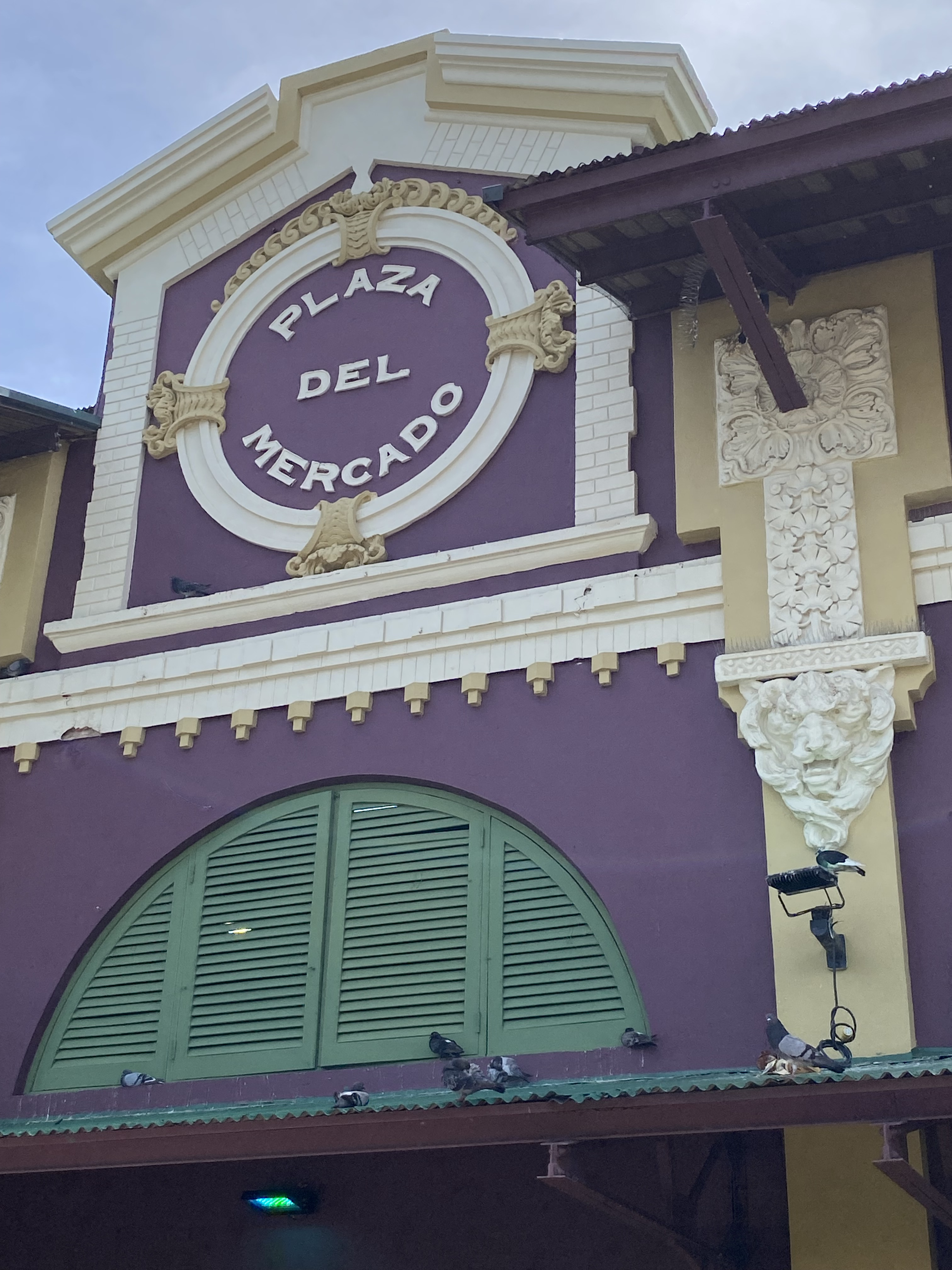
Ornate facade of the Plaza del Mercado, Santurce, San Juan, Puerto Rico

== Gallery ==
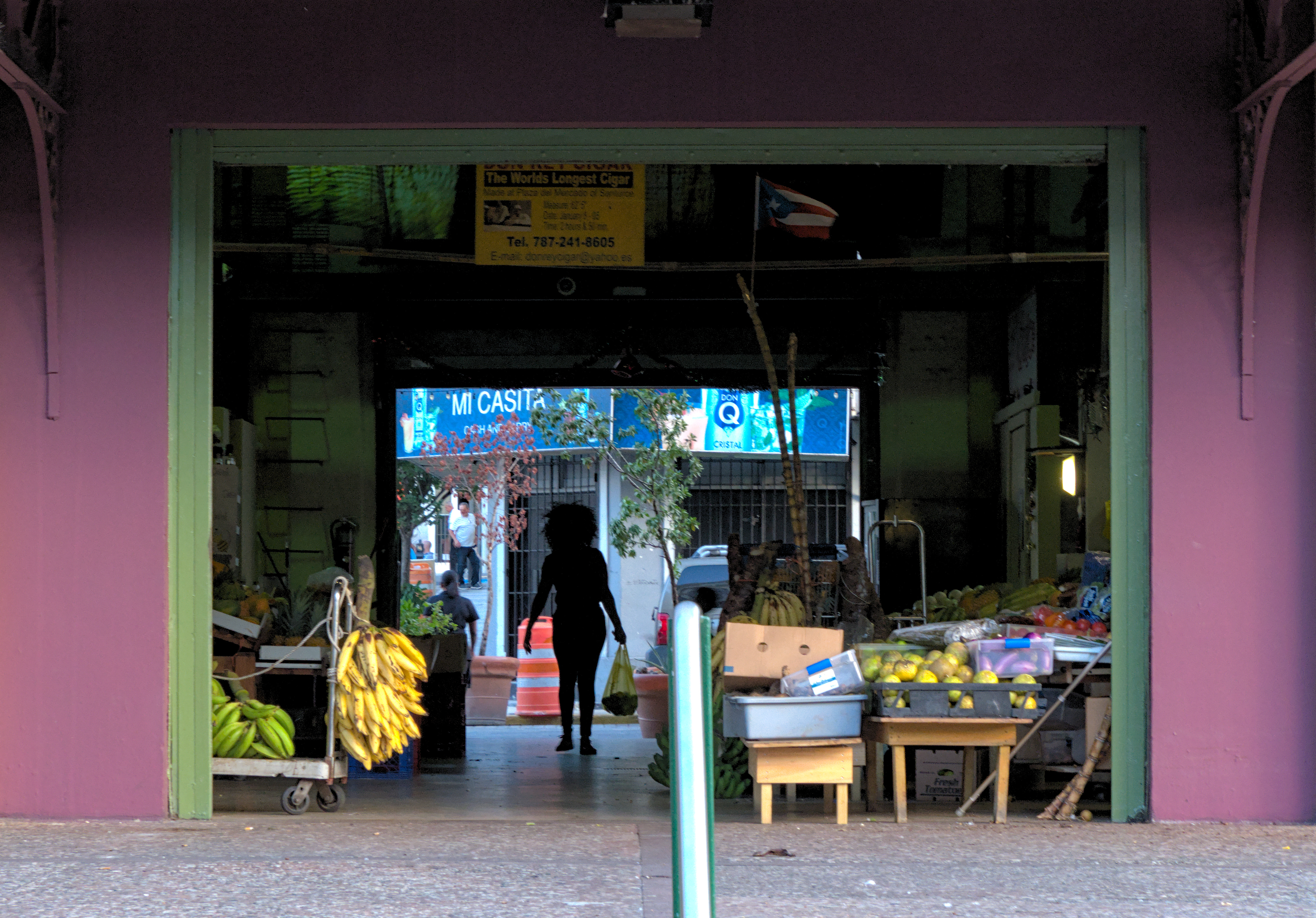
La Placita marketplace building where produce and food are still sold during daytime

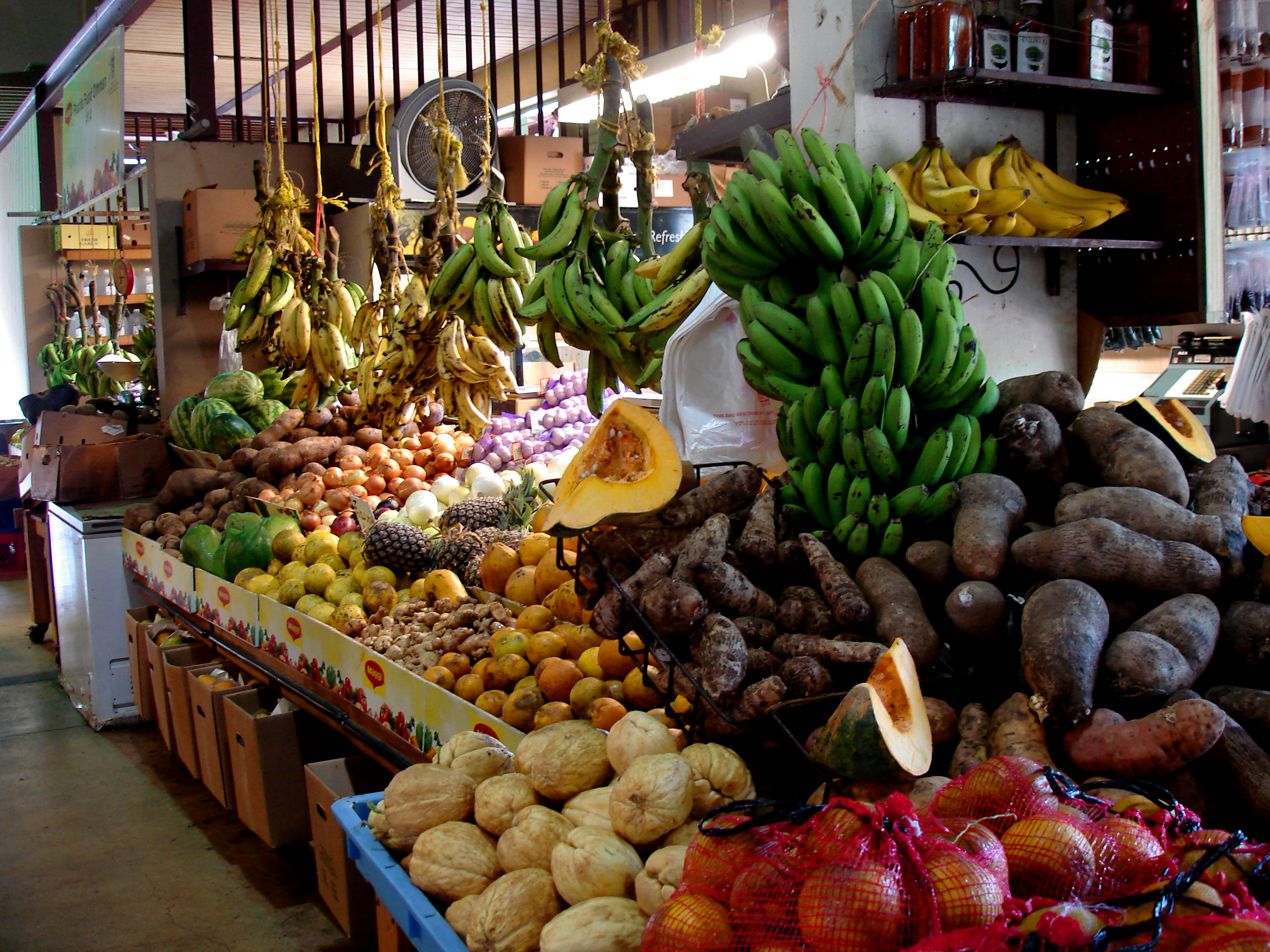
Produce stall in La Placita with typical Puerto Rican fruit and vegetables

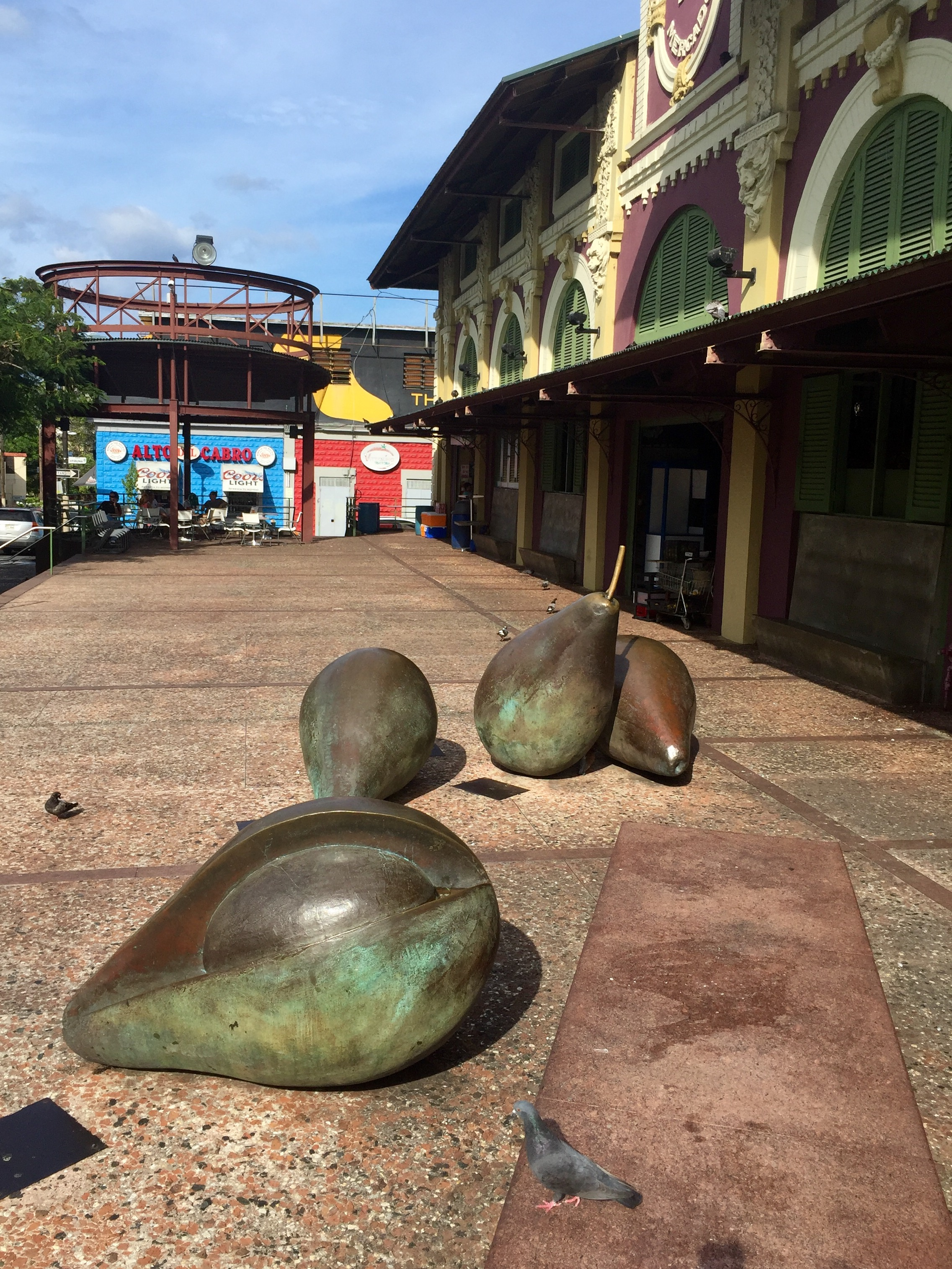
"La Fruta Favorita" avocado sculpture by Annex Burgos

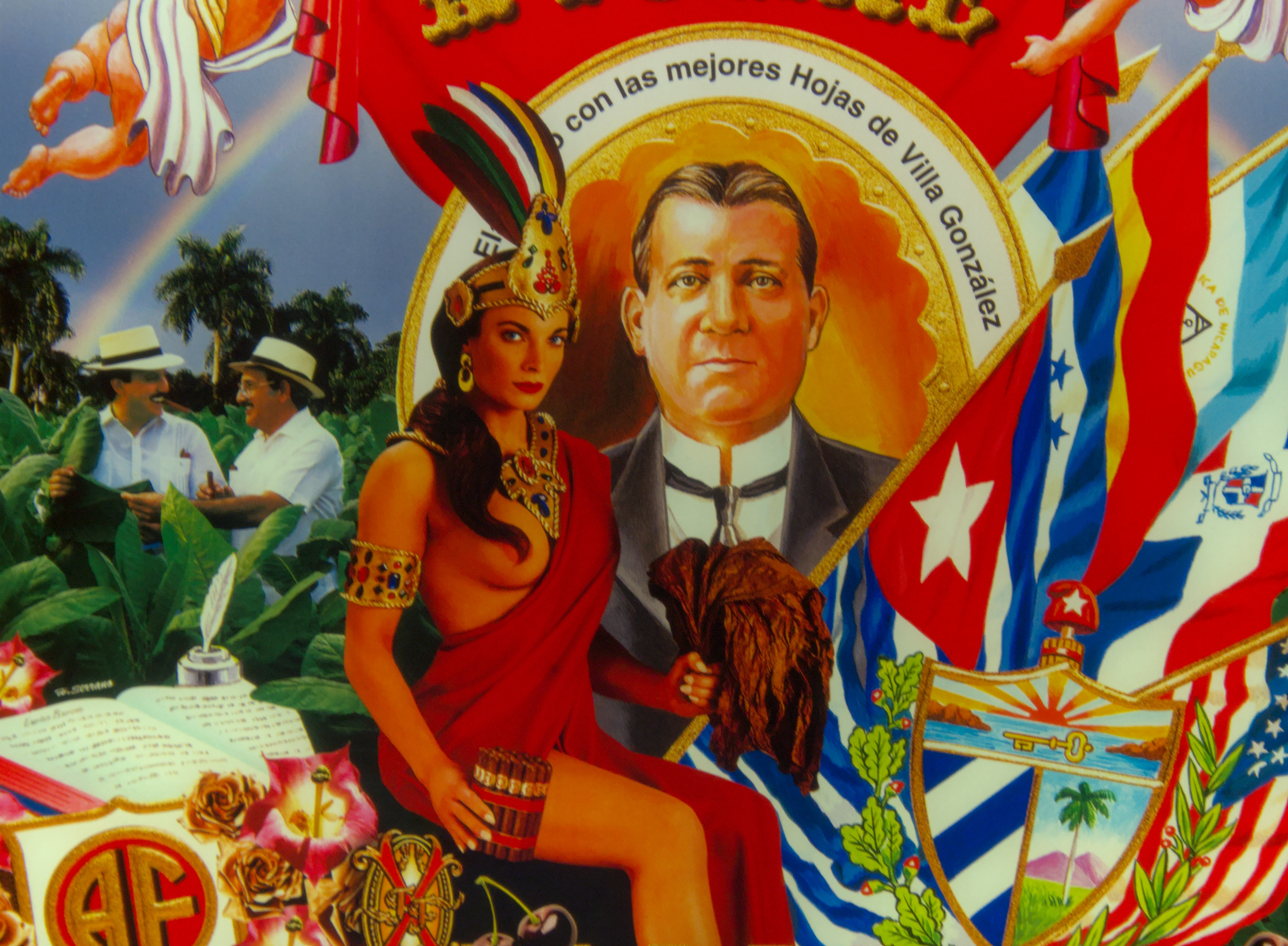
Mural in La Placita. The area is also known for its street art.

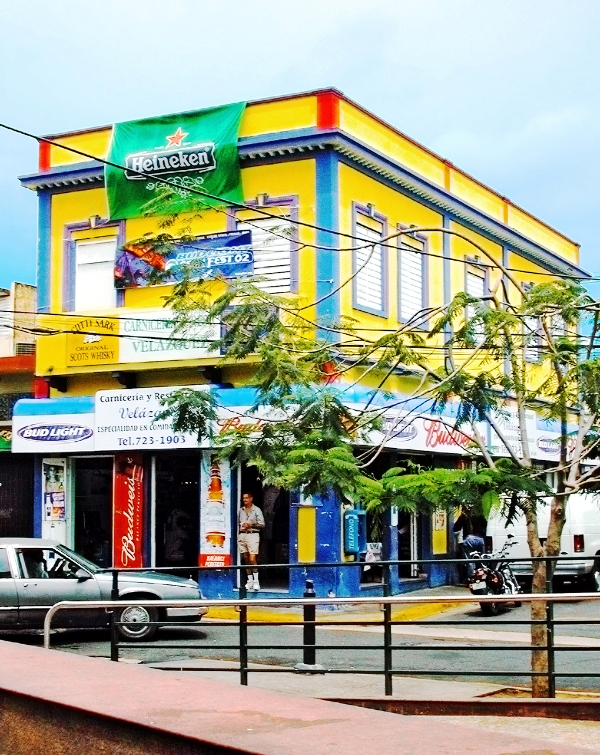
One of the numerous bars and entertainment businesses in the area

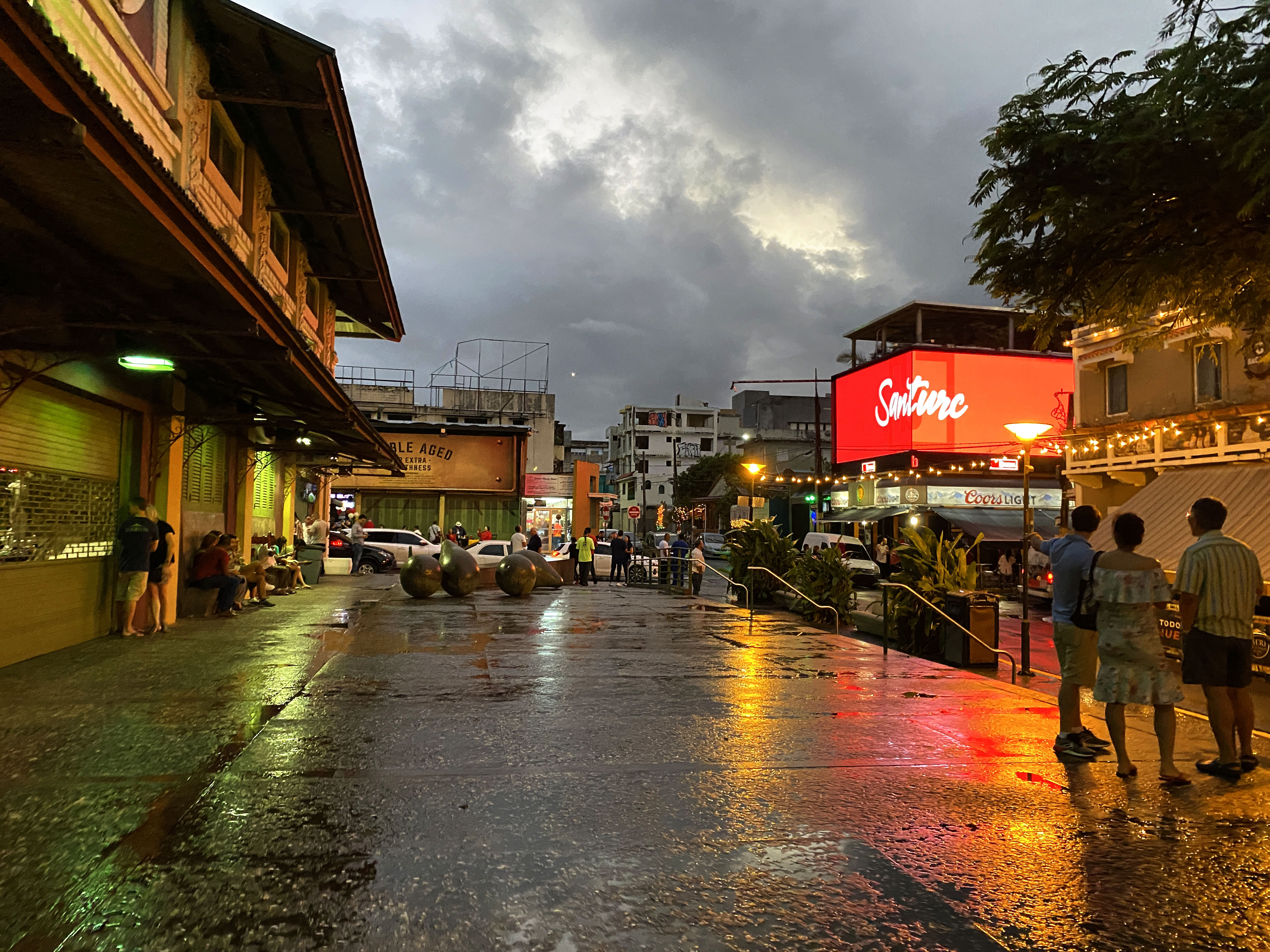
Neighborhood at night

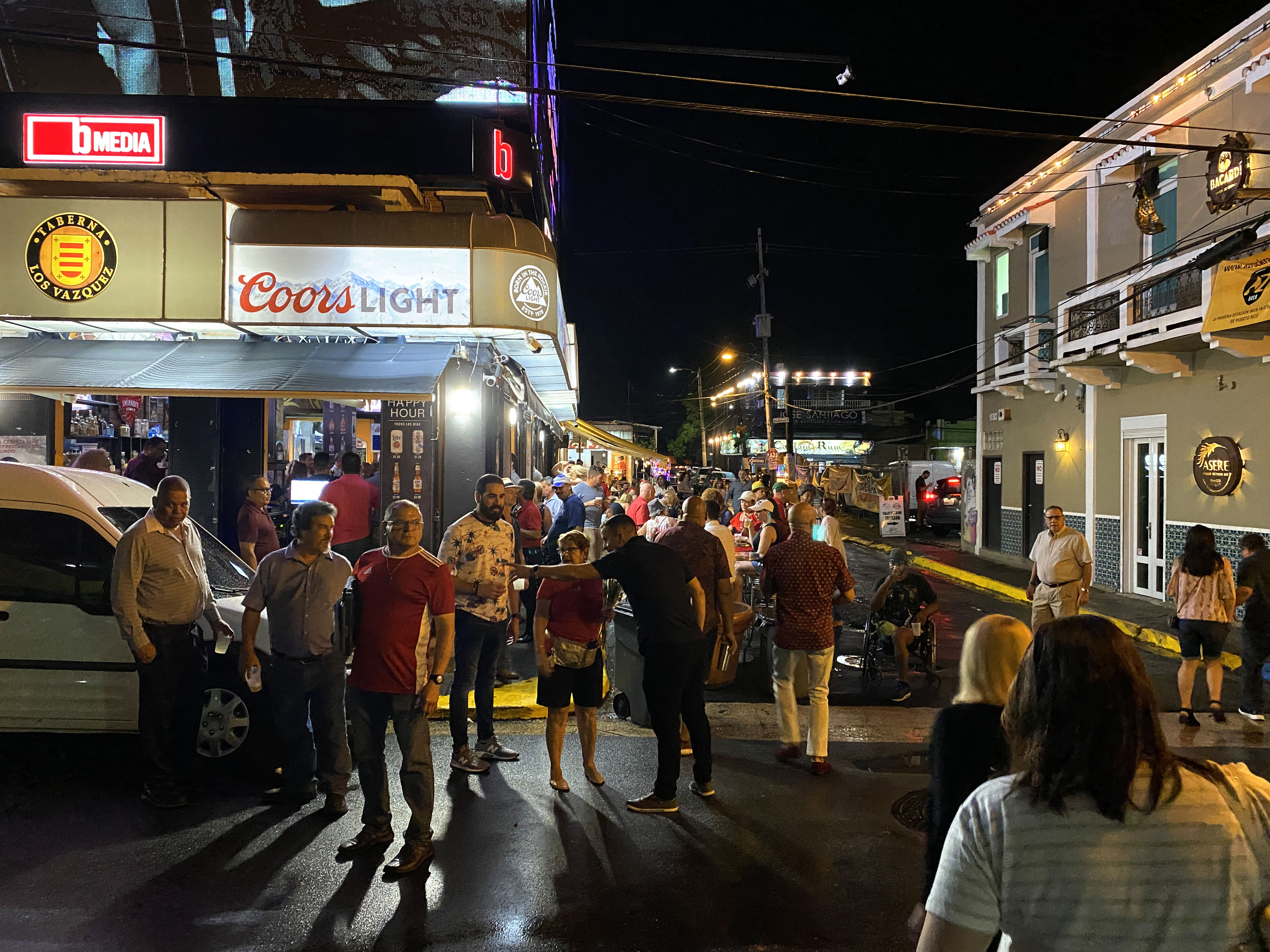
Crowds in the neighborhood at night

== See also ==
- Ponce Market Square
- Manatí Market Square
