= Campo Alegre / Alto del Cabro (Santurce) =

Subbarrios of Santurce in San Juan, Puerto Rico

Coordinates: 18°27′05″N 66°04′22″W

- Subbarrio
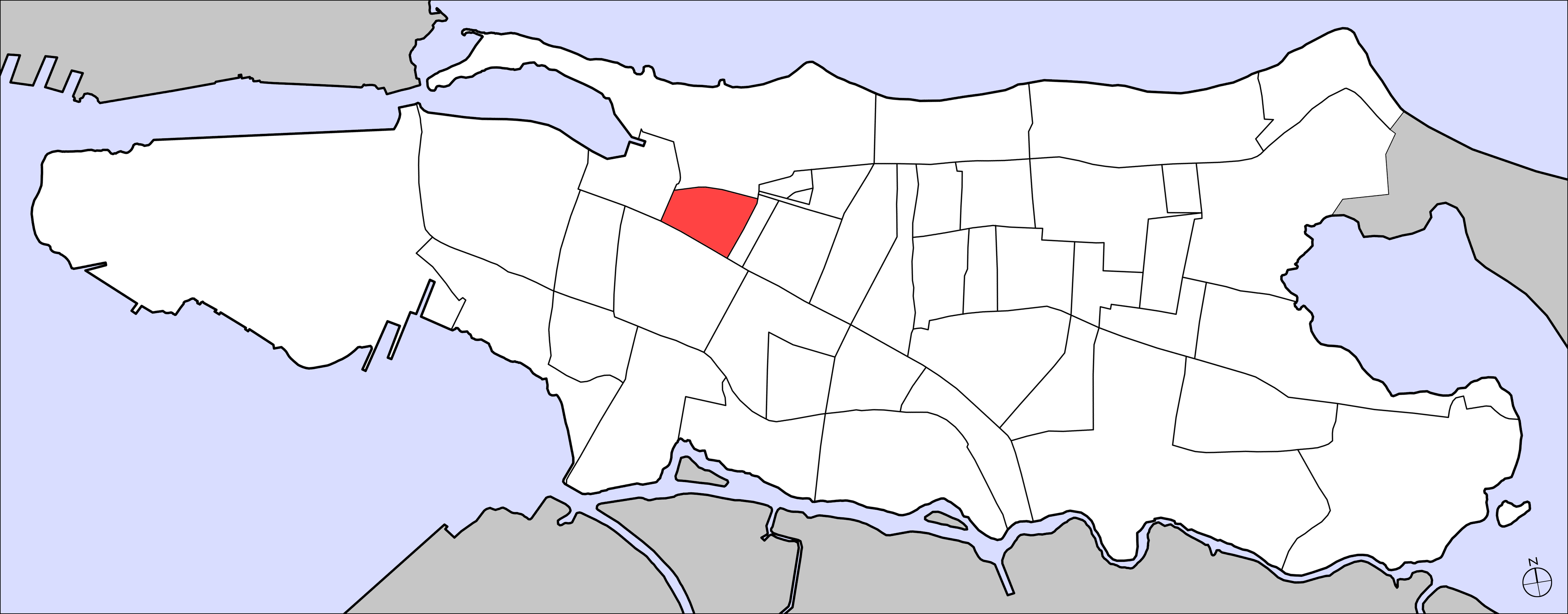
- Location of Campo Alegre within the Barrio of Santurce

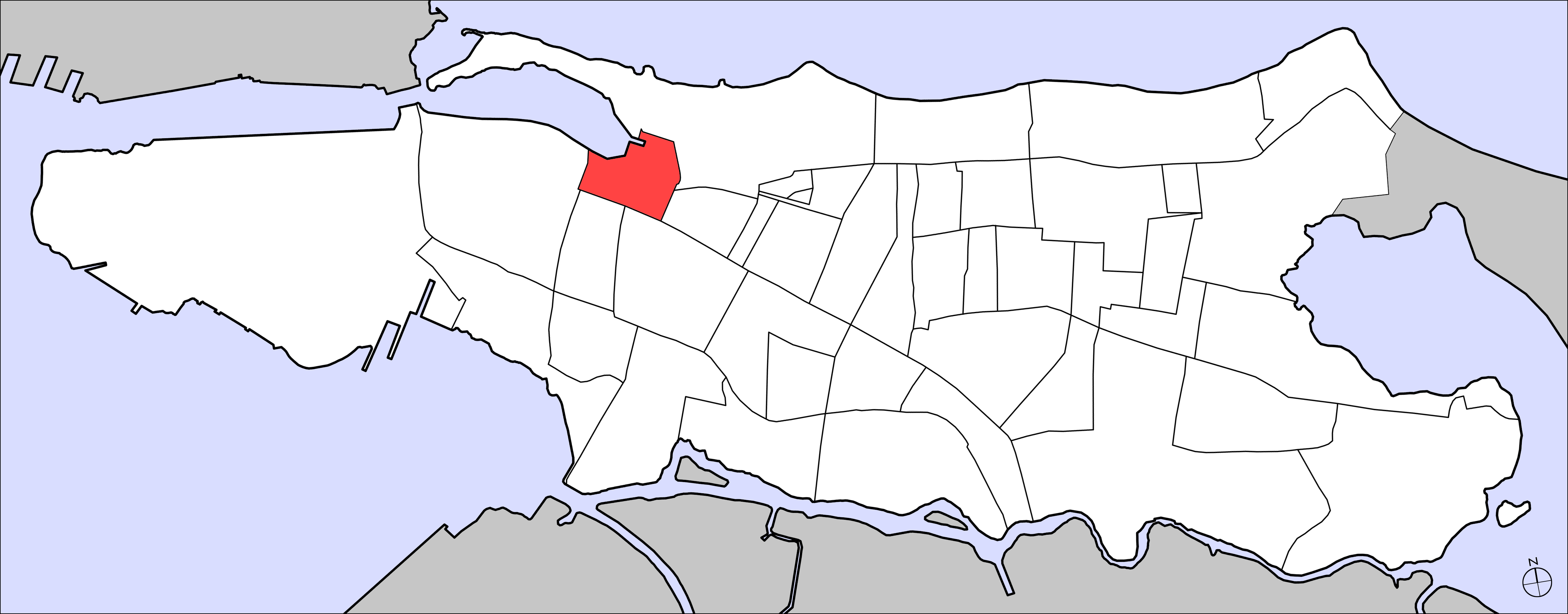
- Location of Alto del Cabro within the Barrio of Santurce
- Commonwealth: Puerto Rico
- Municipality: San Juan
- Barrio: Santurce

Population
  - Total: 2,106 (combined)
- Source: 2000 United States census

Campo Alegre and Alto del Cabro are two subbarrios adjacent to each other with similar characteristics in the Barrio of Santurce. They have a combined land area of 0.28 square kilometres (0.11 sq mi) and a resident population of 2,106 as of the 2000 United States census. They are located between Expreso Baldorioty de Castro to the north, Ponce de León Avenue to the south, Cerra Street to the west and Canals and Robles Streets to the east. These subbarrios, urbanized during the 19th century, are two of the oldest sections of Santurce. The perpendicular streets running north of Ponce de León Avenue are those corresponding to old toponymical alignments of the proprietors throughout Carretera Central.

== Architectural value ==
Today some Masonry structures in the criollo neoclassic style, with two or three-opening façades, some with store (tienda) on street level still exist, although the sector is characterized mainly by its wood vernacular pueblerino criollo constructions.

The most prominent structure of the area, from the architectural-historical point of view, is the Plaza del Mercado de Santurce (Santurce marketplace—also known as La Placita), this West Indian style building is centrally located in the Santurce district and in the center of barrio Campo Alegre and constructed in the first decade of last century.

== Plaza del Mercado ==
The Plaza del Mercado de Santurce has been active since 1910 and as always, the market stocks fresh farmland produce and provisions; tropical fruits, vegetables and yams to herbs & spices and medicinal & aromatic plants. At noon and in the evenings, quaint restaurants and cantinas with “al fresco” sitting surrounding the Plaza have become popular with the buttoned-up and the bohemian crowds.

== Demographics ==
The population for Alto del Cabro:

Historical population
| Census | Pop. | Note | %± |
|---|---|---|---|
| 1940 | 2,733 | | — |
| 1950 | 2,633 | | −3.7% |
| 1980 | 1,096 | | — |
| 1990 | 1,129 | | 3.0% |
| 2000 | 1,164 | | 3.1% |
| 2010 | 891 | | −23.5% |
Alto del Cabro 1980-2000 2010

The population for Campo Alegre:

Historical population
| Census | Pop. | Note | %± |
|---|---|---|---|
| 1940 | 3,355 | | — |
| 1950 | 3,001 | | −10.6% |
| 1980 | 1,051 | | — |
| 1990 | 779 | | −25.9% |
| 2000 | 942 | | 20.9% |
| 2010 | 723 | | −23.2% |
Campo Alegre

== Gallery ==
Sites in Campo Alegre and Alto del Cabro:

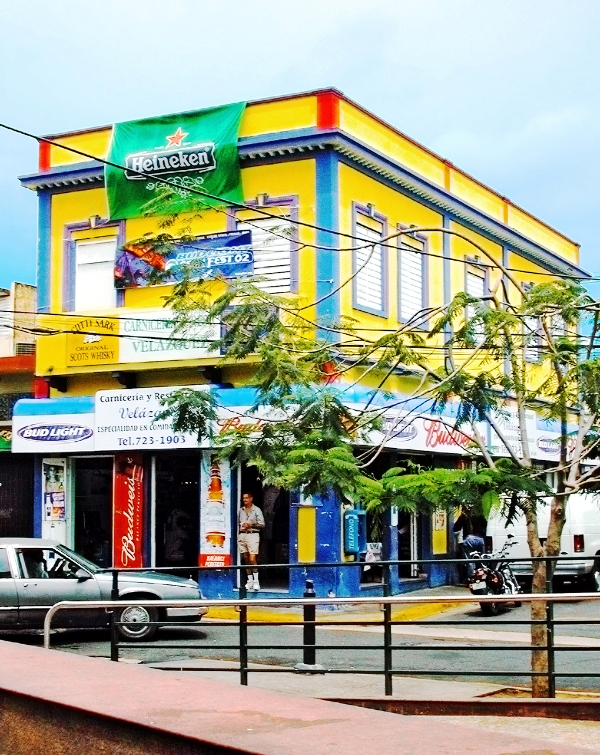
Bright yellow bar in Campo Alegre, Santurce

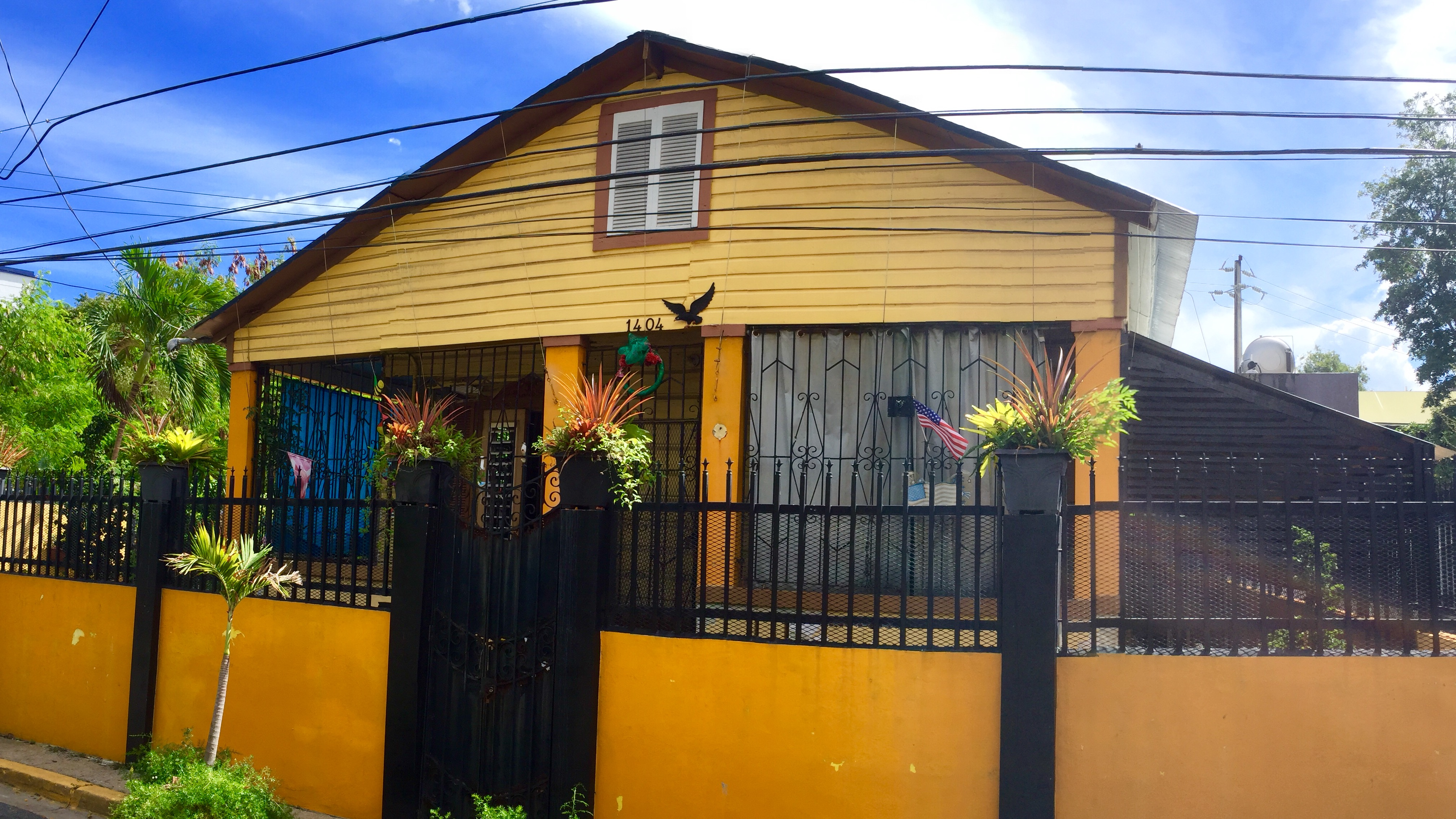
Campo Alegre pueblerino Criollo-style home

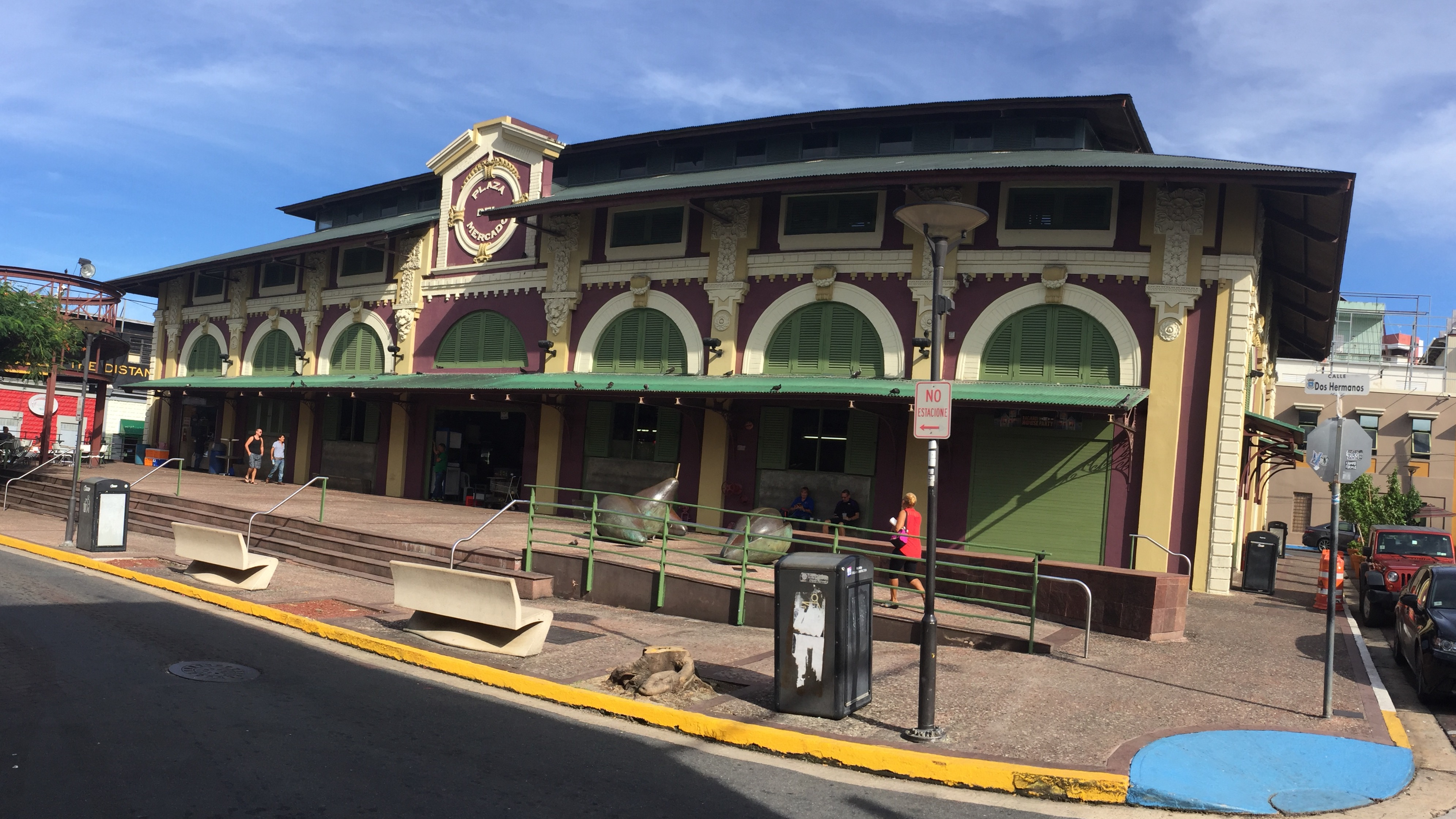
Plaza del Mercado de Santurce at Campo Alegre

== See also ==
- List of communities in Puerto Rico
