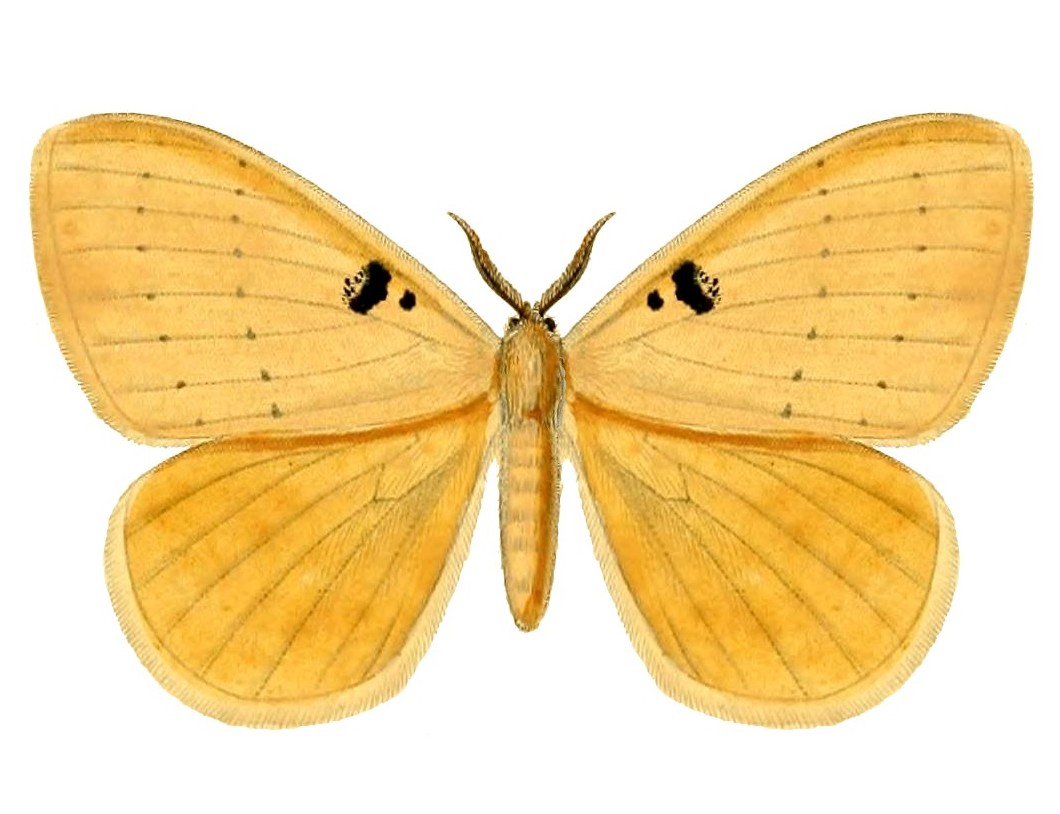
- Hemijana bimaculata

Scientific classification
- Kingdom: Animalia
- Phylum: Arthropoda
- Class: Insecta
- Order: Lepidoptera
- Family: Eupterotidae
- Subfamily: Janinae
- Genus: Hemijana; Aurivillius, 1901

= Hemijana =

Genus of moths

Hemijana is a genus of moths in the family Eupterotidae.

== Species ==
- Hemijana griseola Rothschild, 1917
- Hemijana subrosea Aurivillius, 1893
- Hemijana variegata Rothschild, 1917

== Former species ==
- Hemijana ruberrima Rothschild, 1917
