= Hemijana subrosea =

Scientific classification
- Kingdom: Animalia
- Phylum: Arthropoda
- Class: Insecta
- Order: Lepidoptera
- Family: Eupterotidae
- Genus: Hemijana
- Species: H. subrosea

Binomial name
- Hemijana subrosea (Aurivillius, 1893)

Synonyms
- Jana subrosea Aurivillius, 1893; Hemijana ruberrima Rothschild, 1917; Hemijana subrosea f. disticta Berio, 1937

Species of moth

Hemijana subrosea is a moth in the family Eupterotidae. It was described by Per Olof Christopher Aurivillius in 1893. It is found in Angola and South Africa.

The wingspan about 60 mm. The forewings are cinnamon grey tinged with salmon and with three minute stigmatic dots, as well as three postmedian crenulate dark-grey lines. The fringe and subterminal area are stained with salmon red. The hindwings are salmon scarlet.
