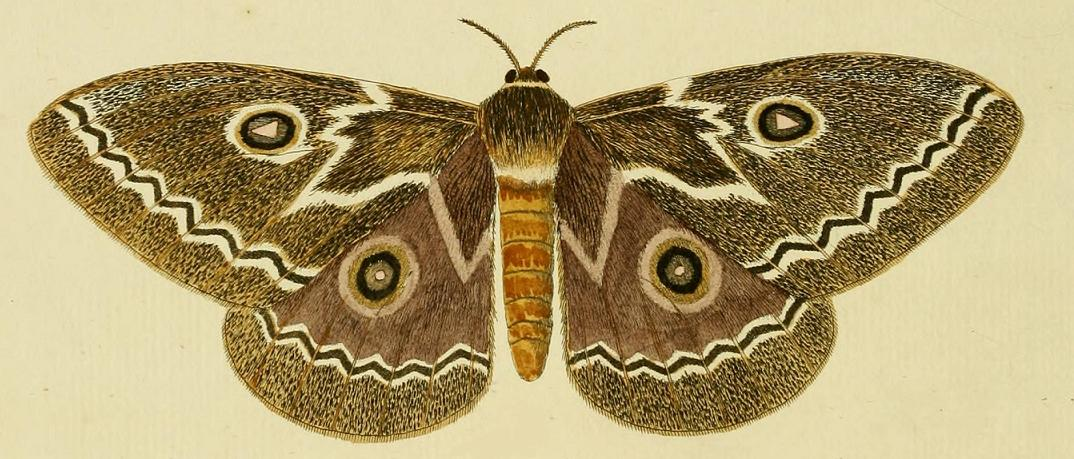

Scientific classification
- Domain: Eukaryota
- Kingdom: Animalia
- Phylum: Arthropoda
- Class: Insecta
- Order: Lepidoptera
- Family: Saturniidae
- Genus: Gonimbrasia
- Species: G. tyrrhea

Binomial name
- Gonimbrasia tyrrhea (Cramer, 1776)

Synonyms
- Attacus tyrrhea Cramer, 1776

= Gonimbrasia tyrrhea =

Species of moth

Gonimbrasia tyrrhea, the zigzag emperor moth, is a moth of the family Saturniidae. The species was first described by Pieter Cramer in 1776. It is found in central and southern Africa.

The wingspan is 90–120 mm.

The larvae feed on Acacia mollissima, Malus, Fagus, Salix and Laburnum species.
