= Latin American and Caribbean Bulletin of Medicinal and Aromatic Plants =

Boletin Latinoamericano y del Caribe de Plantas Medicinales y Aromaticas
- Discipline: Pharmacognosy, ethnopharmacology
- Language: English, French, Portuguese, Spanish
- Edited by: J. L. Martinez, J. M. Prieto

Publication details
- History: 2002-present
- Publisher: Cooperacion Latinoamericana y del Caribe en Plantas Medicinales y Aromaticas
- Frequency: Bimonthly
- Open access: Yes
- License: Commons Attributions 3.0 noncommercial / non derivative works

Standard abbreviations
- ISO 4: Bol. Latinoam. Caribe Plantas Med. Aromat.

Indexing
- ISSN: 0717-7917
- OCLC no.: 847863163

Links
- Journal homepage

The Boletin latinoamericano y del caribe de plantas medicinales y aromaticas (English: Latin American and Caribbean Bulletin of Medicinal and Aromatic Plants) is a bimonthly peer-reviewed scientific journal covering research on all aspects of medicinal and aromatic plants. Articles are published in Spanish or English.

== History ==
The journal was established in 2002 as a communication tool to keep the Latin-American community informed on events and news related to medicinal and aromatic plants taking place around the world. This primary objective is still achieved by means of the so-called "supplements" issued in between each bulletin. The official launch of the publication took place in Buenos Aires, Argentina, during the first Latin-American Congress of Phytochemistry.

The journal started to publish scientific contributions during its second year of publication. In 2007, the journal officially changed from a newsletter format to a more traditional journal format, typically publishing more than five original papers per issue. Articles are published under a Creative Commons Attribution license and access to its repository is free.

== Annual meetings ==
Congreso Latinoamericano de Plantas Medicinales

== See also ==
- Ethnobotany
