= Hemijana griseola =

Scientific classification
- Kingdom: Animalia
- Phylum: Arthropoda
- Class: Insecta
- Order: Lepidoptera
- Family: Eupterotidae
- Genus: Hemijana
- Species: H. griseola

Binomial name
- Hemijana griseola Rothschild, 1917

Species of moth

Hemijana griseola is a moth in the family Eupterotidae. It was described by Rothschild in 1917. It is found in South Africa.

The wingspan about 54 mm. The forewings are yellowish brown-grey, with a subbasal chocolate patch on the inner margin, an antemedian transverse line to the base of vein two and a strongly angled and sinuate postmedian brown line beyond which is a less strongly marked and less sinuate line on the outer edge of which between vein six and the costa are three dark-brown dots. The hindwings are yellowish cinnamon, with darker hairs on the abdominal area and a median shadow line, as well as a dark-cinnamon postmedian line.
