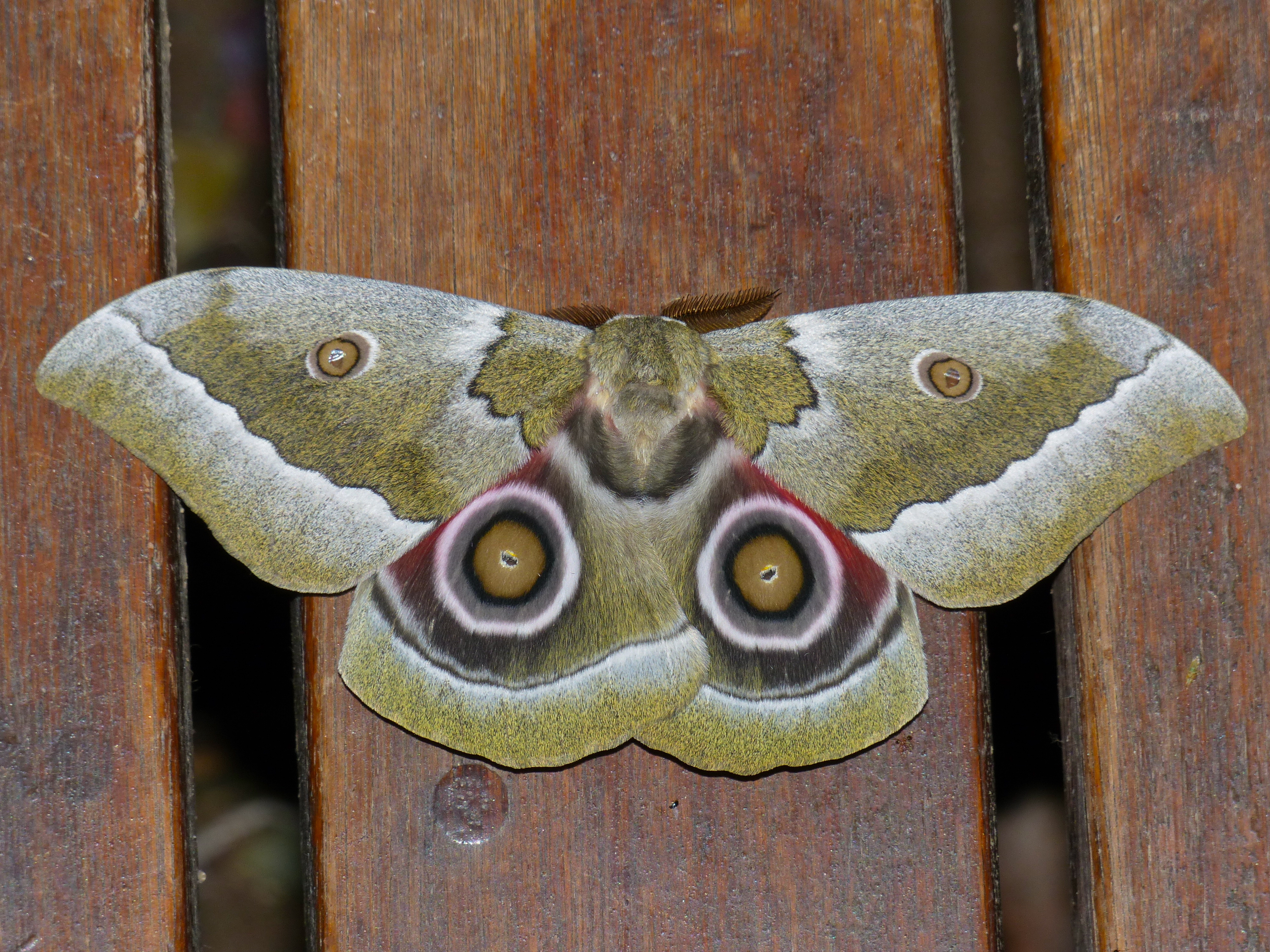
- G. zambesina, South Africa
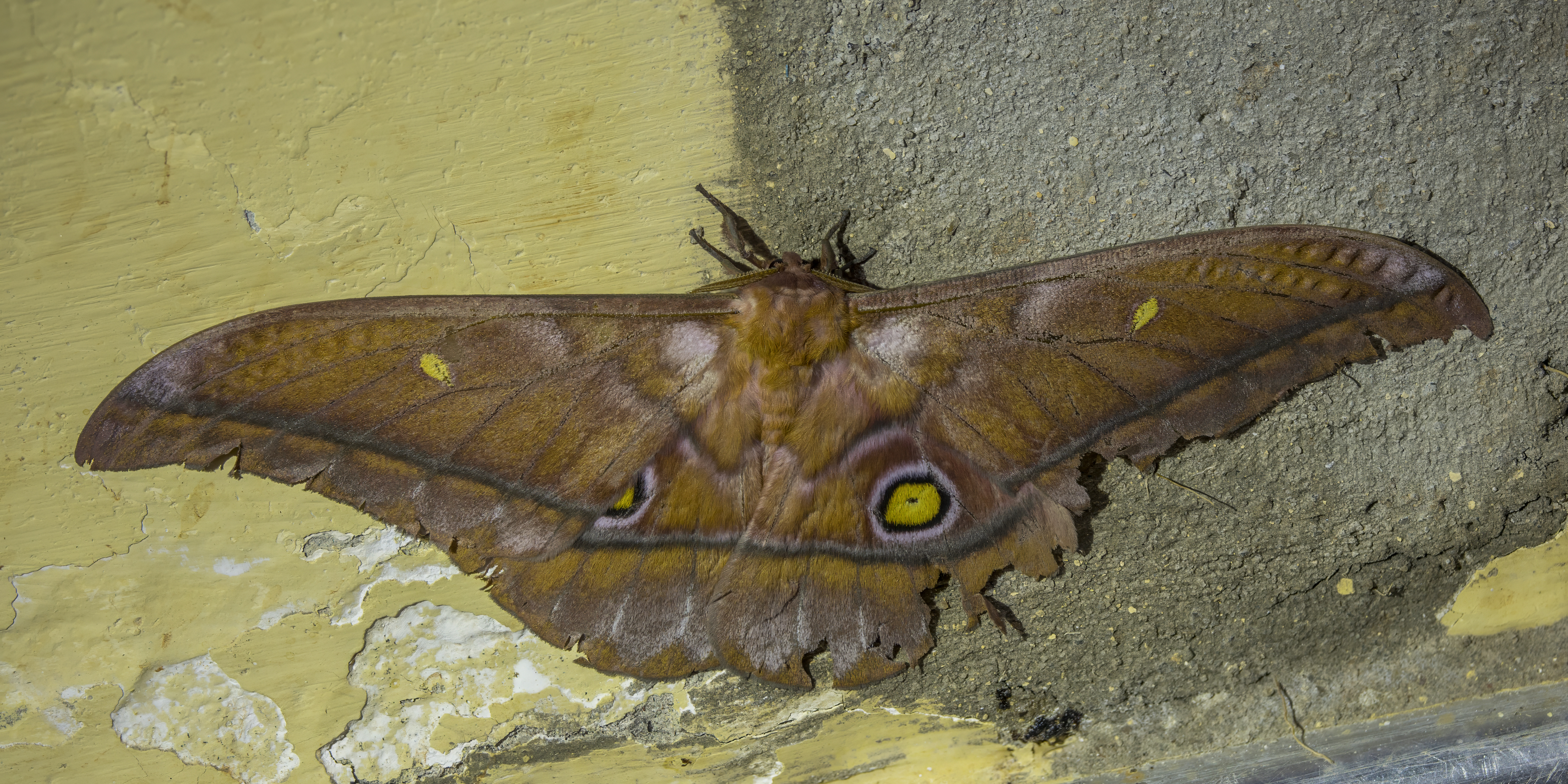
- G. xanthomma, Ghana

Scientific classification
- Domain: Eukaryota
- Kingdom: Animalia
- Phylum: Arthropoda
- Class: Insecta
- Order: Lepidoptera
- Family: Saturniidae
- Subfamily: Saturniinae
- Tribe: Bunaeini
- Genus: Gonimbrasia; Butler, 1878

= Gonimbrasia =

Genus of moths

Gonimbrasia is a genus of moths in the family Saturniidae first described by Arthur Gardiner Butler in 1878.

== Species ==
- Gonimbrasia abayana (Rougeot, 1977)
- Gonimbrasia alcestris Weymer, 1907
- Gonimbrasia annulata Bouvier, 1936
- Gonimbrasia balachowskyi Rougeot, 1973
- Gonimbrasia belina (Westwood, 1849) – mopane worm
- Gonimbrasia birbiri (Bouvier, 1929)
- Gonimbrasia cocaulti Darge & Terral, 1993
- Gonimbrasia congolensis Bouvier, 1927
- Gonimbrasia conradsi Rebel, 1906
- Gonimbrasia deborah (Weymer, 1886)
- Gonimbrasia ellisoni Lemaire, 1962
- Gonimbrasia fletcheri Rougeot, 1960
- Gonimbrasia fucata Rougeot, 1978
- Gonimbrasia godarti Lemaire, 1971
- Gonimbrasia hecate Rougeot, 1955
- Gonimbrasia huebneri Kirby, 1877
- Gonimbrasia miranda Darge, 2005
- Gonimbrasia nictitans (Fabricius, 1775)
- Gonimbrasia osiris Druce, 1896
- Gonimbrasia pales (Weymer, 1909)
- Gonimbrasia rectilineata Sonthonnax, 1901
- Gonimbrasia ruandana Gaede, 1927
- Gonimbrasia said (Oberthuer, 1878)
- Gonimbrasia tyrrhea (Cramer, 1775)
- Gonimbrasia ufipana Strand, 1911
- Gonimbrasia ukerewensis Rebel, 1922
- Gonimbrasia xanthomma Rothschild, 1907
- Gonimbrasia zambesina (Walker, 1865)
