= Hemijana variegata =

Scientific classification
- Kingdom: Animalia
- Phylum: Arthropoda
- Class: Insecta
- Order: Lepidoptera
- Family: Eupterotidae
- Genus: Hemijana
- Species: H. variegata

Binomial name
- Hemijana variegata Rothschild, 1917

Species of moth

Hemijana variegata is a moth in the family Eupterotidae. It was described by Rothschild in 1917. It is found in Mozambique.

The wingspan about 55 mm. The forewings are cinnamon pinkish white, but the outer one-third umber-brown washed and clouded with pinkish cinnamon and cinnamon-white. There is an arc of three large irregular umber-brown patches on basal one-fourth, as well as several lines and a black stigmatic dot beyond which is a brown patch. The outer one-third of the wing is sharply cut off from the basal paler two-thirds. The hindwings are salmon-pink, the outer one-third with an ill-defined broad sooty grey-black band and suffusion.
