= Plaza del Mercado de Manatí =

Historic building in Manatí, Puerto Rico

- Plaza del Mercado de Manati
- U.S. National Register of Historic Places
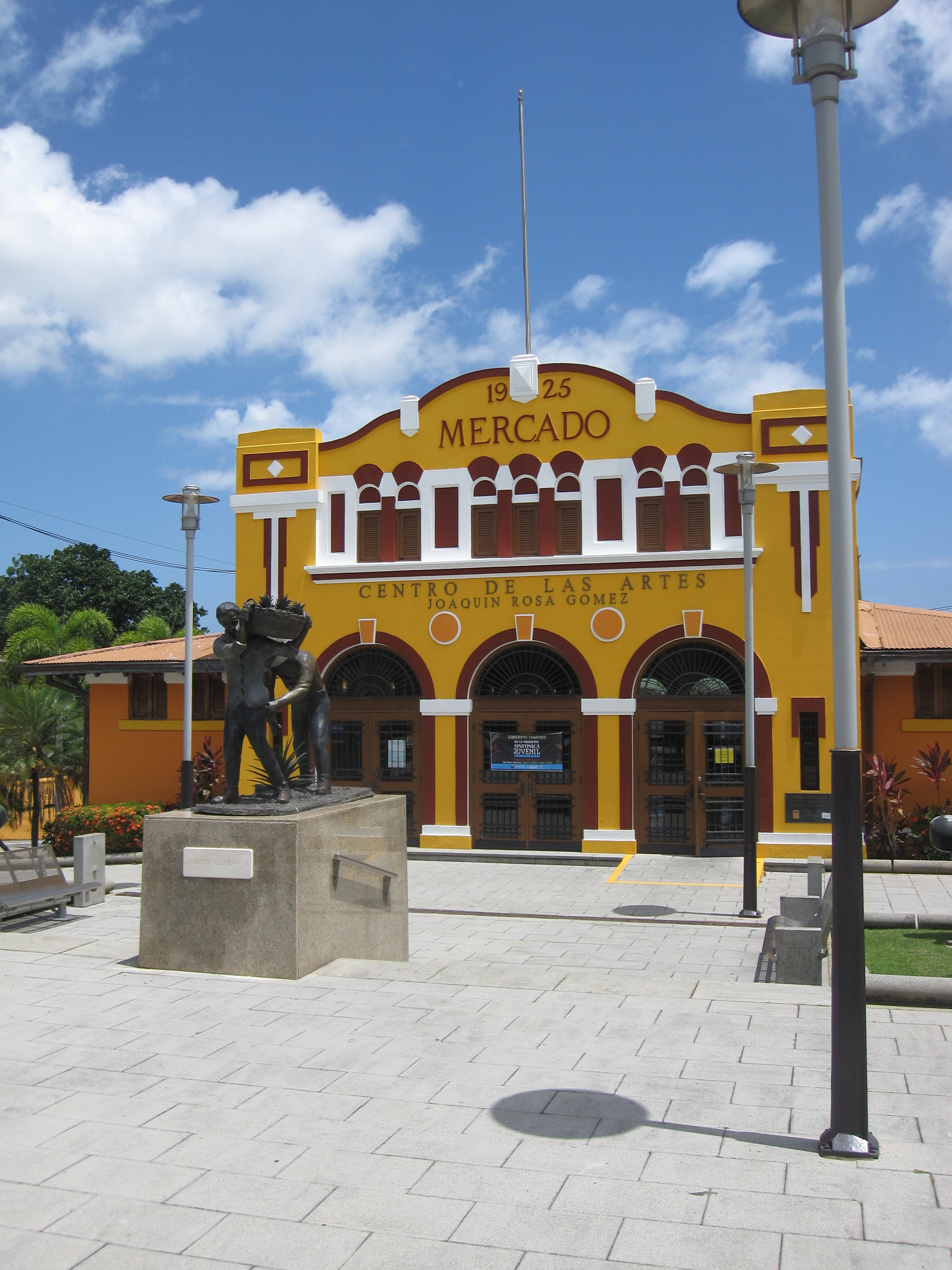
- Plaza del Mercado de Manatí, in Manatí barrio-pueblo, Puerto Rico

- Location within Puerto Rico
- Location: Quinones, Padial and Baldorioty Sts., Manati, Puerto Rico
- Coordinates: 18°25′45″N 66°29′37″W
- Area: less than one acre
- Built: 1925
- Architect: Rafael Carmoega, Fidel Sevillano
- Architectural style: Art Deco, Mission/ Spanish Revival
- NRHP reference No.: 88001303
- Added to NRHP: August 19, 1988

Plaza del Mercado de Manatí is a historic marketplace building in Manatí, Puerto Rico. It was the first structure that attempted to house under one roof all of the market functions that until 1925 were carried out in an open lot on Padial Street. This new typology was for meeting health and hygiene regulations introduced by the United States government. Constructing the building in the place of the original market helped preserve the continuity of uses and the commercial character of this part of Manatí barrio-pueblo, the downtown area of the municipality of Manatí.

The building, oriented from north to south, is located in the town square of Manatí and opens onto two streets. On Padial Street, the building is at the ground level but on Quiñones Street there is a 15 foot (4.6 m) difference, which required the construction of a monumental staircase. This difference in level allowed for the design of a basement which served as a warehouse and commercial space.

== Gallery ==
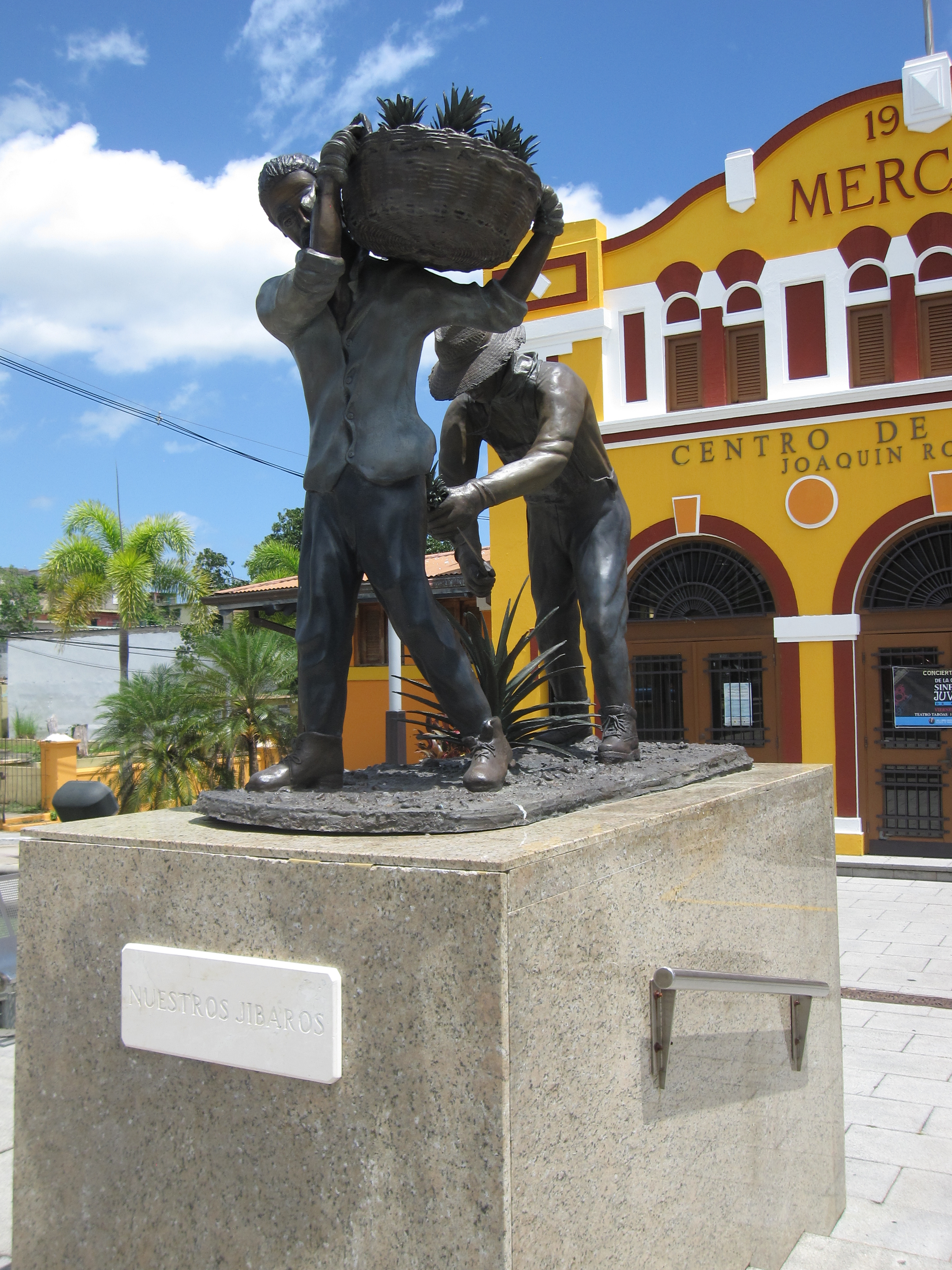
Monument honoring Nuestros jíbaros (our farmers)

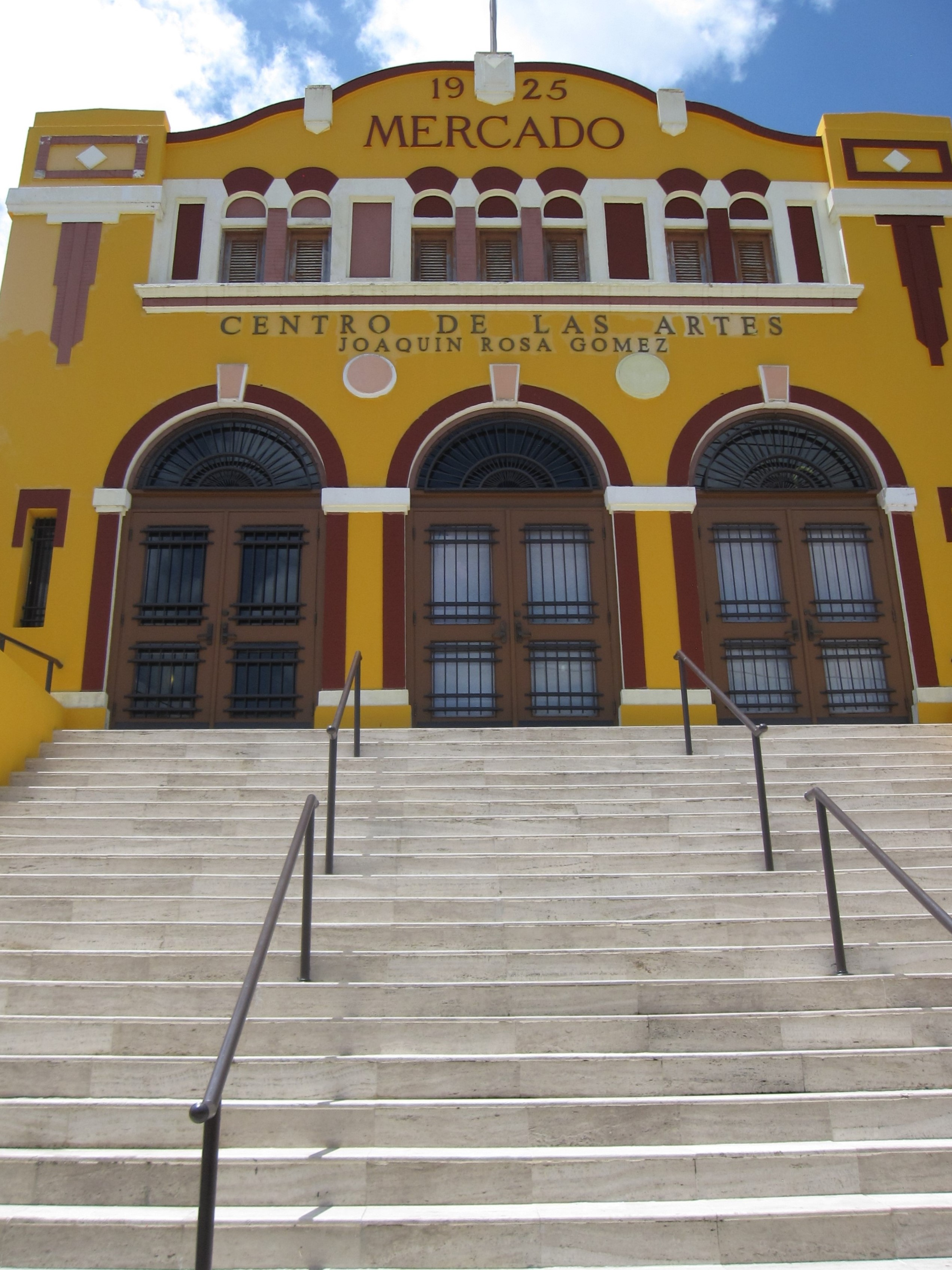
Plaza del Mercado de Manatí with its monumental staircase

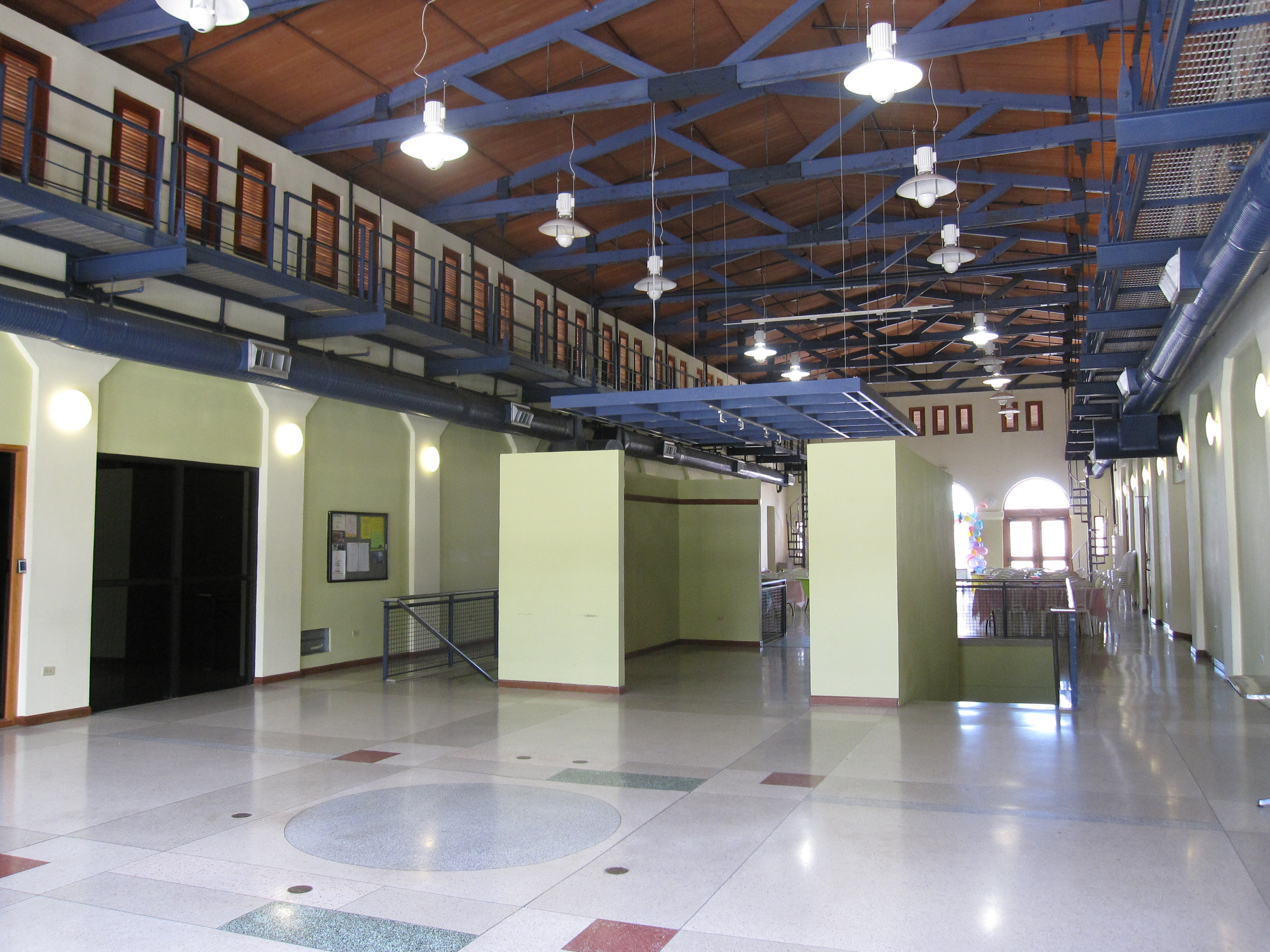
The interior of the building which is now used as a (Center of Arts), Centro de las Artes

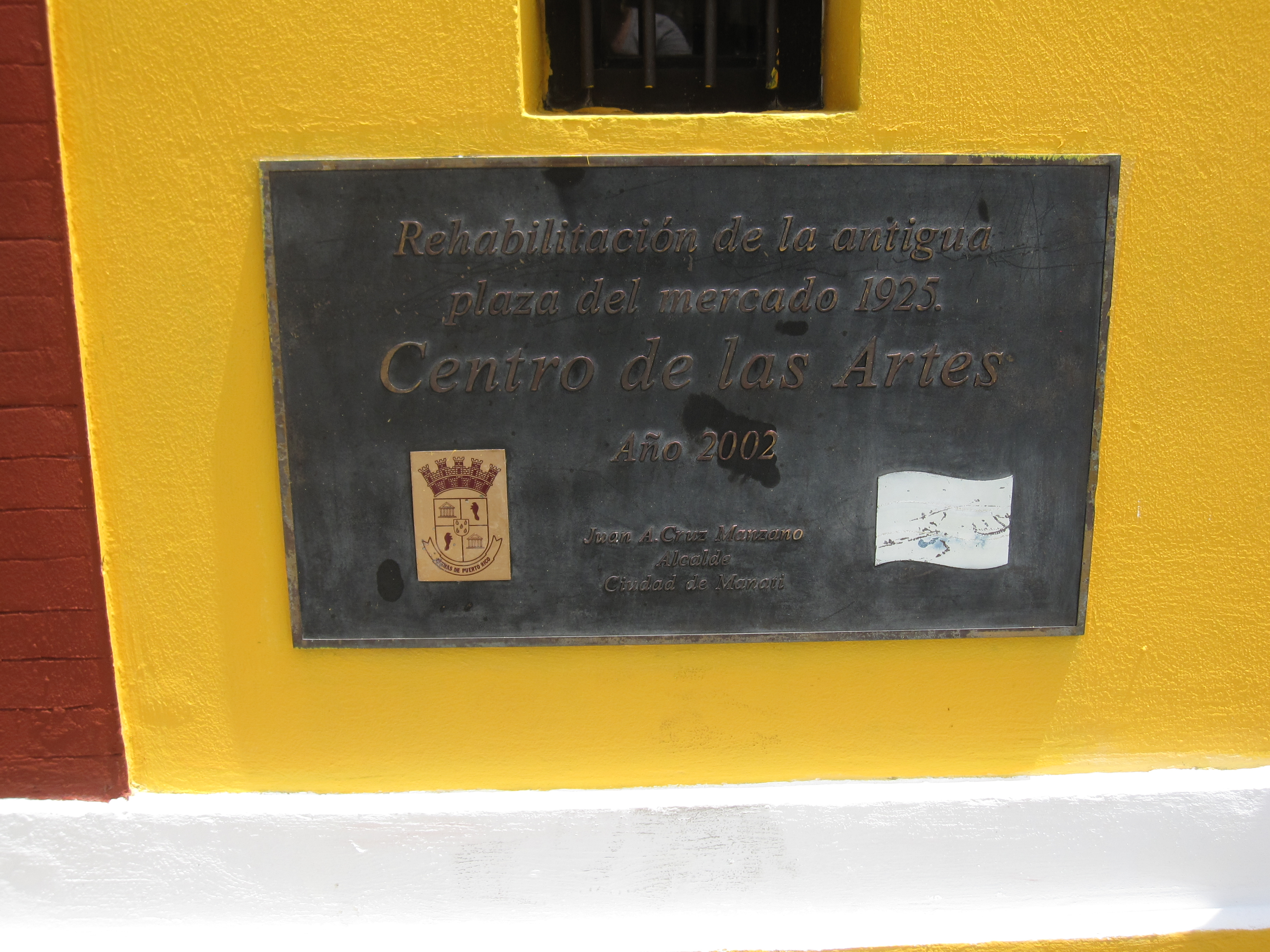
Plaque outside Plaza del Mercado de Manatí

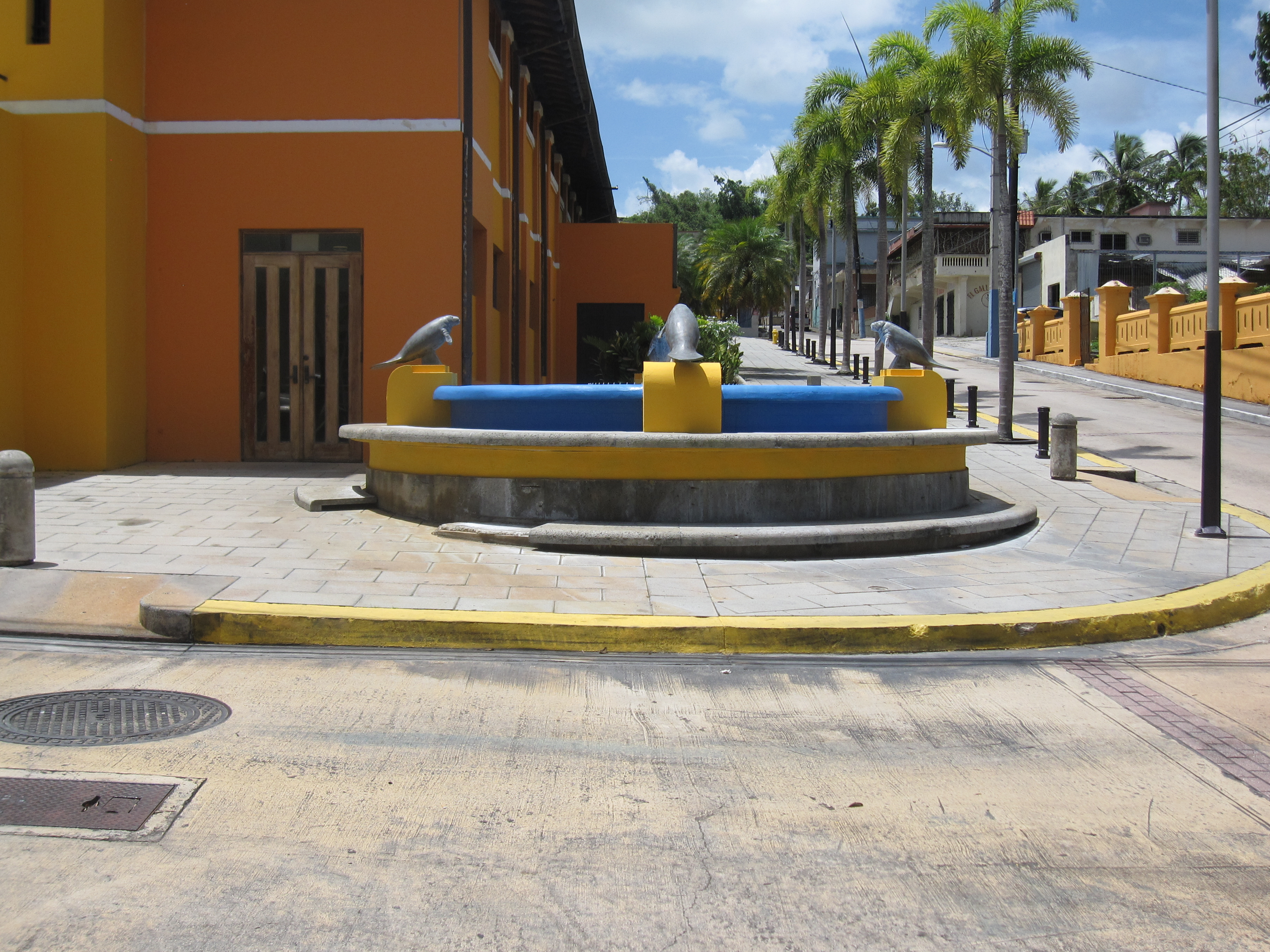
Fountain on the corner of Plaza del Mercado
