= Ethnomedicine =

Study of traditional medicine practiced in ethnic groups

Ethnomedicine is a study or comparison of the traditional medicine based on bioactive compounds in plants and animals and practiced by various ethnic groups, especially those with little access to western medicines, e.g., indigenous peoples. The word ethnomedicine is sometimes used as a synonym for traditional medicine.

Ethnomedical research is interdisciplinary; in its study of traditional medicines, it applies the methods of ethnobotany and medical anthropology. Often, the medicine traditions it studies are preserved only by oral tradition. In addition to plants, some of these traditions constitute significant interactions with insects on the Indian Subcontinent, in Africa, or elsewhere around the globe.

Scientific ethnomedical studies constitute either anthropological research or drug discovery research. Anthropological studies examine the cultural perception and context of a traditional medicine. Ethnomedicine has been used as a starting point in drug discovery, specifically those using reverse pharmacological techniques.

== Ethnopharmacology ==
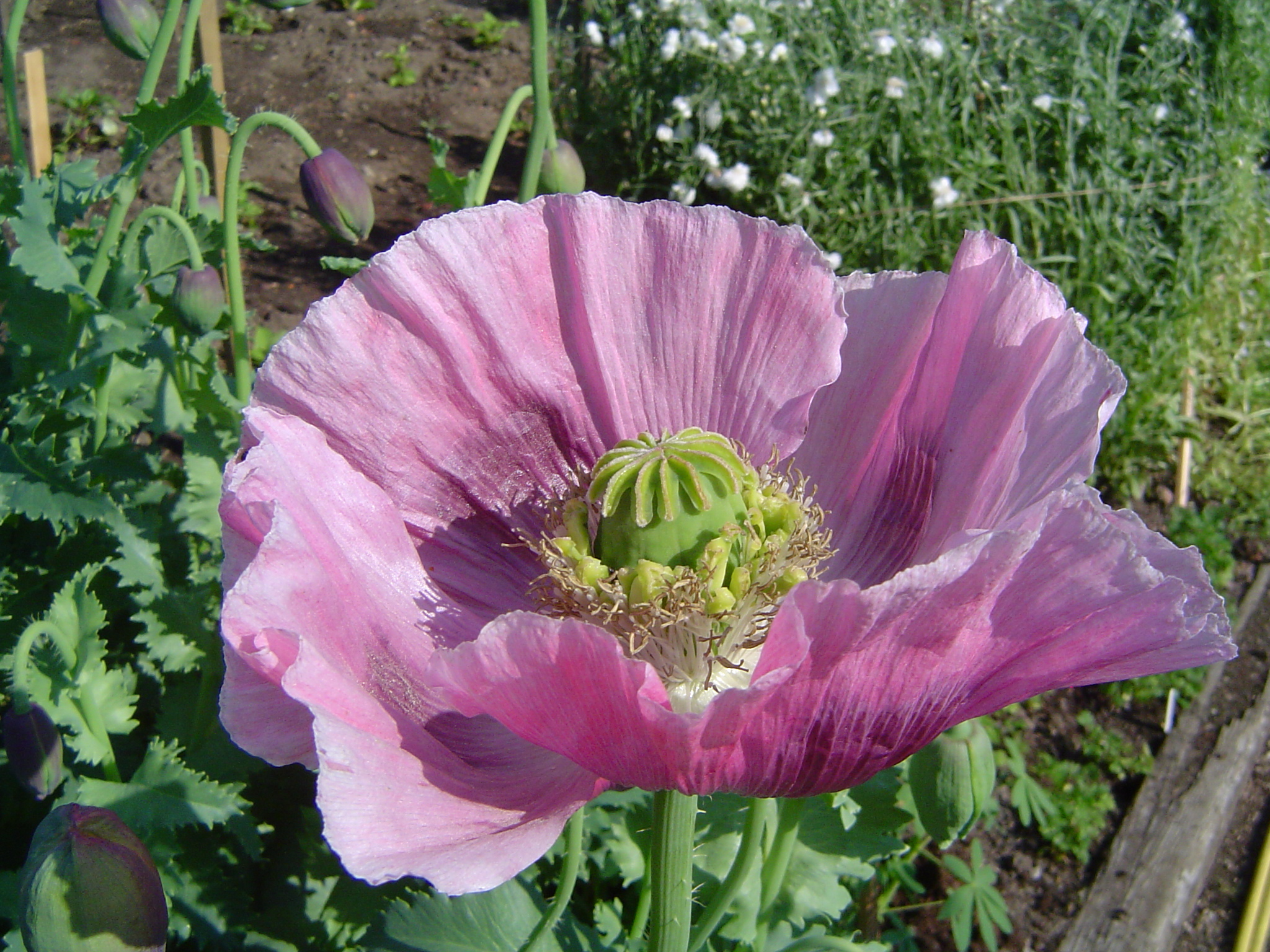
The opium poppy Papaver somniferum, used in traditional medicine for millennia, is the source of the alkaloids Opium, morphine, codeine and heroin.

Ethnopharmacology is a related field which studies ethnic groups and their use of plant compounds. It is linked to pharmacognosy, phytotherapy (study of medicinal plants) use and ethnobotany, as this is a source of lead compounds for drug discovery. A 2026 study combined the analysis of more than 41,000 historical Chinese medical recipes with nuclear receptor profiling and identified several plant fractions capable of modulating glucocorticoid receptor activity, illustrating how traditional pharmacopeias can serve as starting points for modern drug discovery. Emphasis has long been on traditional medicines, although the approach also has proven useful to the study of modern pharmaceuticals. According to a 2023 paper for newcomers to the field, "the responsibility of today's ethnopharmacologists involves contributing towards species protection, conservation of traditional knowledge and indigenous cultures, as well as advocating for local communities both nationally and internationally."

It involves studies of the:

1. identification and ethnotaxonomy (cognitive categorisation) of the (eventual) natural material, from which the candidate compound will be produced
2. traditional preparation of the pharmaceutical forms
3. bio-evaluation of the possible pharmacological action of such preparations (ethnopharmacology)
4. their potential for clinical effectiveness
5. socio-medical aspects implied in the uses of these compounds (medical anthropology).

== See also ==
- Ayurveda
- Ethnobotany
- Herbalism
- Pharmacognosy
- Shamanism
- The Encyclopedia of Psychoactive Plants
- Traditional medicine
