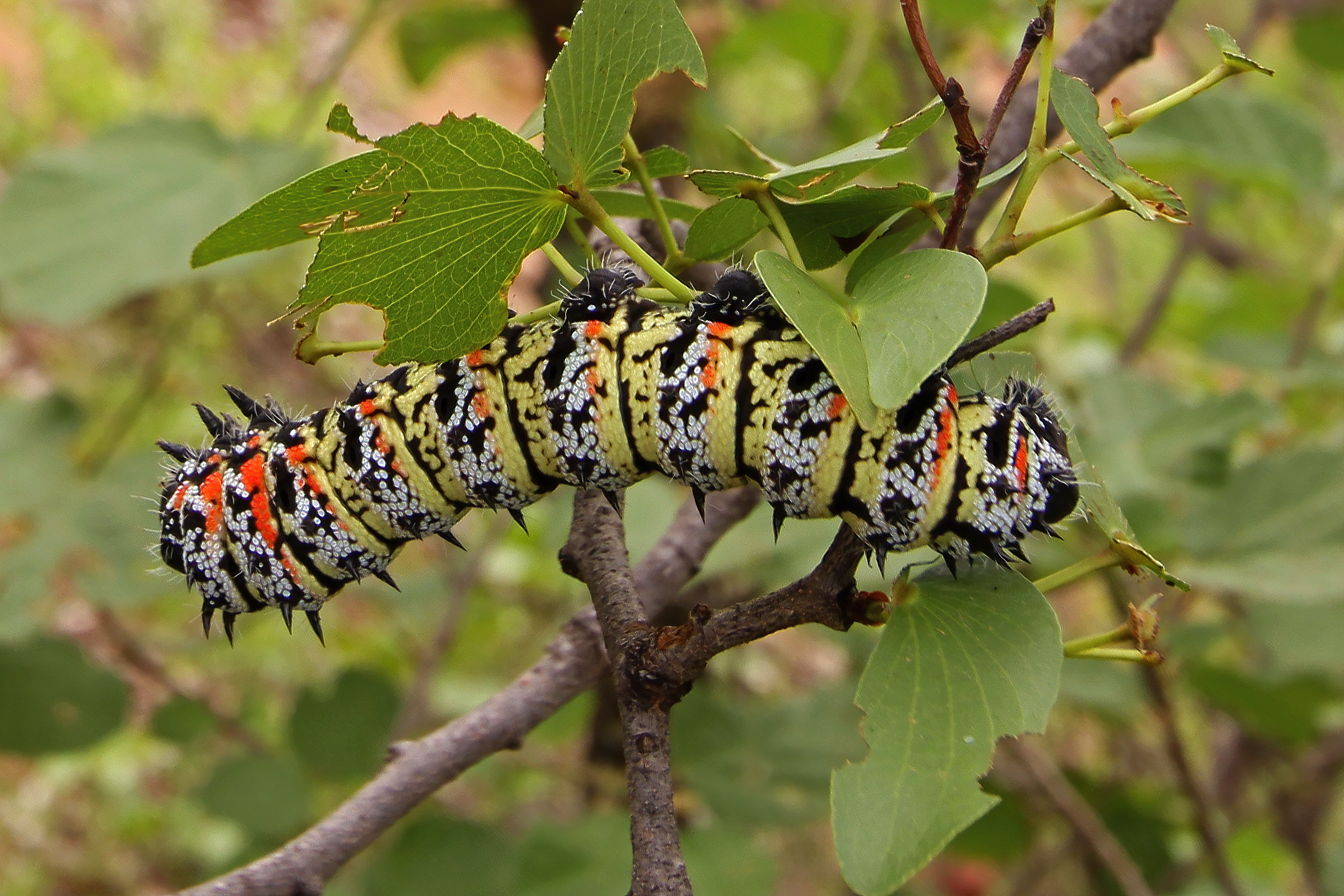

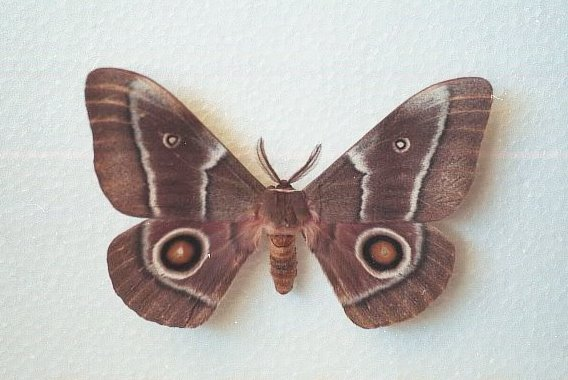
- Caterpillar in a mopane tree, and male imago (note the feathered antennae)

Scientific classification
- Kingdom: Animalia
- Phylum: Arthropoda
- Clade: Pancrustacea
- Class: Insecta
- Order: Lepidoptera
- Family: Saturniidae
- Genus: Gonimbrasia
- Species: G. belina

Binomial name
- Gonimbrasia belina Westwood, 1849

= Gonimbrasia belina =

Mopane moth

Species of emperor moth

Gonimbrasia belina is a species of emperor moth which is native to the warmer parts of southern Africa. Its large edible caterpillar, known as the mopane worm, madora, amacimbi, pigeon moth or masonja, feeds primarily but not exclusively on mopane tree leaves. Mopane worms are an important source of protein for many in the region. The species was first scientifically described by John O. Westwood in 1849.

== Vernacular names ==
The mopane worm is so-called in English because it is usually found on the mopane tree, Colophospermum mopane. Other vernacular names for the caterpillars include:

- Botswana
  - Kalanga: mashonja
  - Tswana: phane
- South Africa
  - Sotho: masonja
  - Northern Sotho: mašotša (colloq)
  - Venda: mashonzha
  - Tsonga: matamani or masonja
  - Southern Ndebele: iinnondo
  - Tswana: masonja, seboko sa mongana
- Zambia
  - muyaya (believed to be the mopane worm)
  - finkubala
  - ifishimu (proper name in the Bemba language)
- Zimbabwe
  - Northern Ndebele: macimbi
  - Shona: madora, masodya or mashonja
  - Kalanga: mahonja
- Namibia
  - Ovambo: omagungu
  - Oshikwanyama: oshuungu
- Democratic Republic of the Congo
  - Kongo: mingolo

The Latin name is sometimes given as Imbrasia belina, rather than Gonimbrasia belina.

== Identification ==
The moths are large with a wingspan of 120 mm. Wings are fawn coloured through shades of green and brown to red, with two black and white bands isolating the eyespots. An orange eyespot is present on each hindwing. Males moths have feathery antennae, which are used to find a mate. Larvae are black, peppered with round scales in indistinct alternating whitish green and yellow bands, and armed with short black or reddish spines covered in fine white hairs.

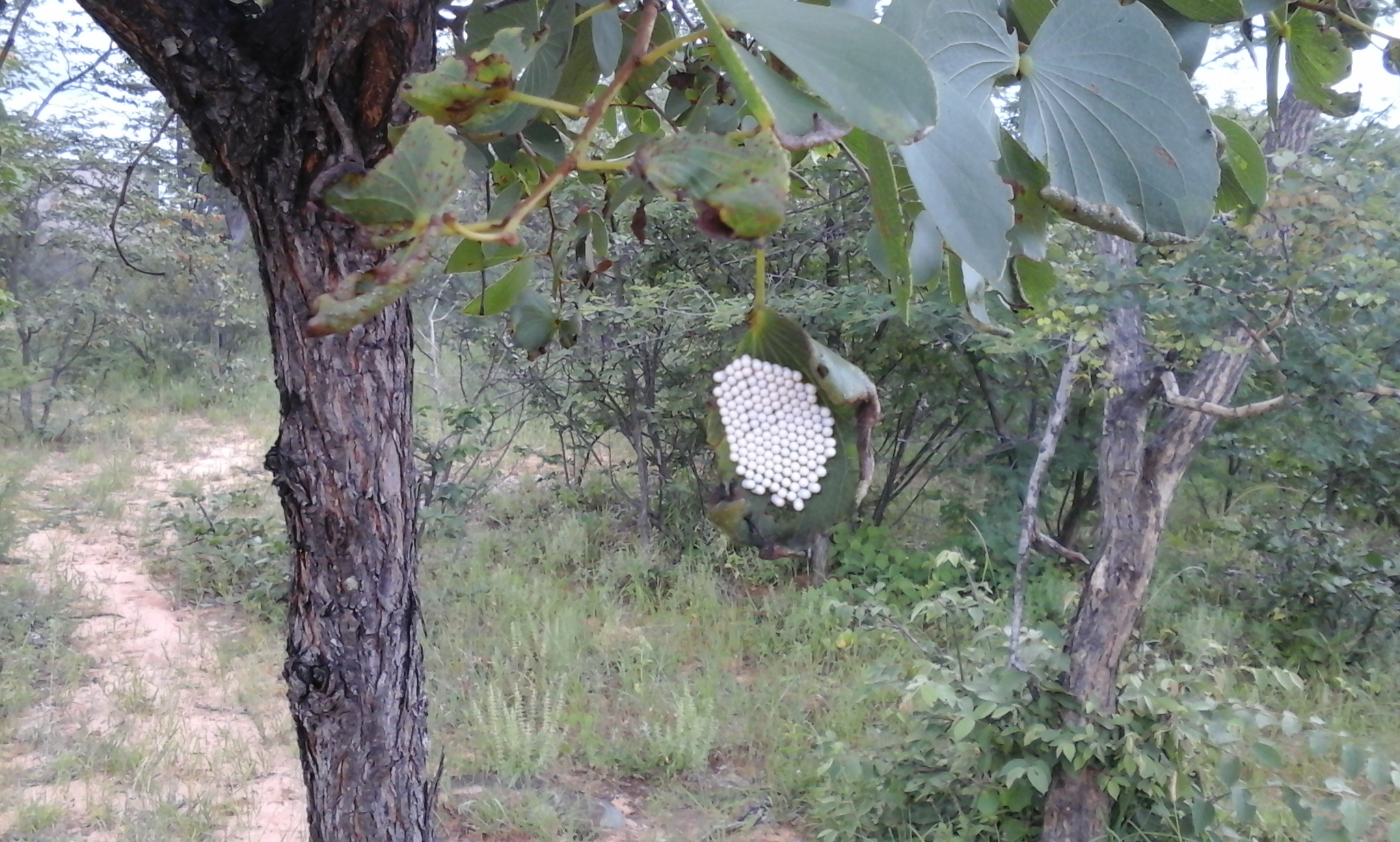
Mopane worm egg cluster

== Biology ==
Larvae eat a wide range of plants including mopane, Carissa grandiflora, Diospyros, Ficus, Rhus, Sclerocarya afra, Terminalia and Trema. After hatching, mopane worm leave host plants without leaves, depriving browsing species of food sources.

== Habitat ==
Widespread. Very common in semi-desert, bushveld and grassland.

== Life cycle ==
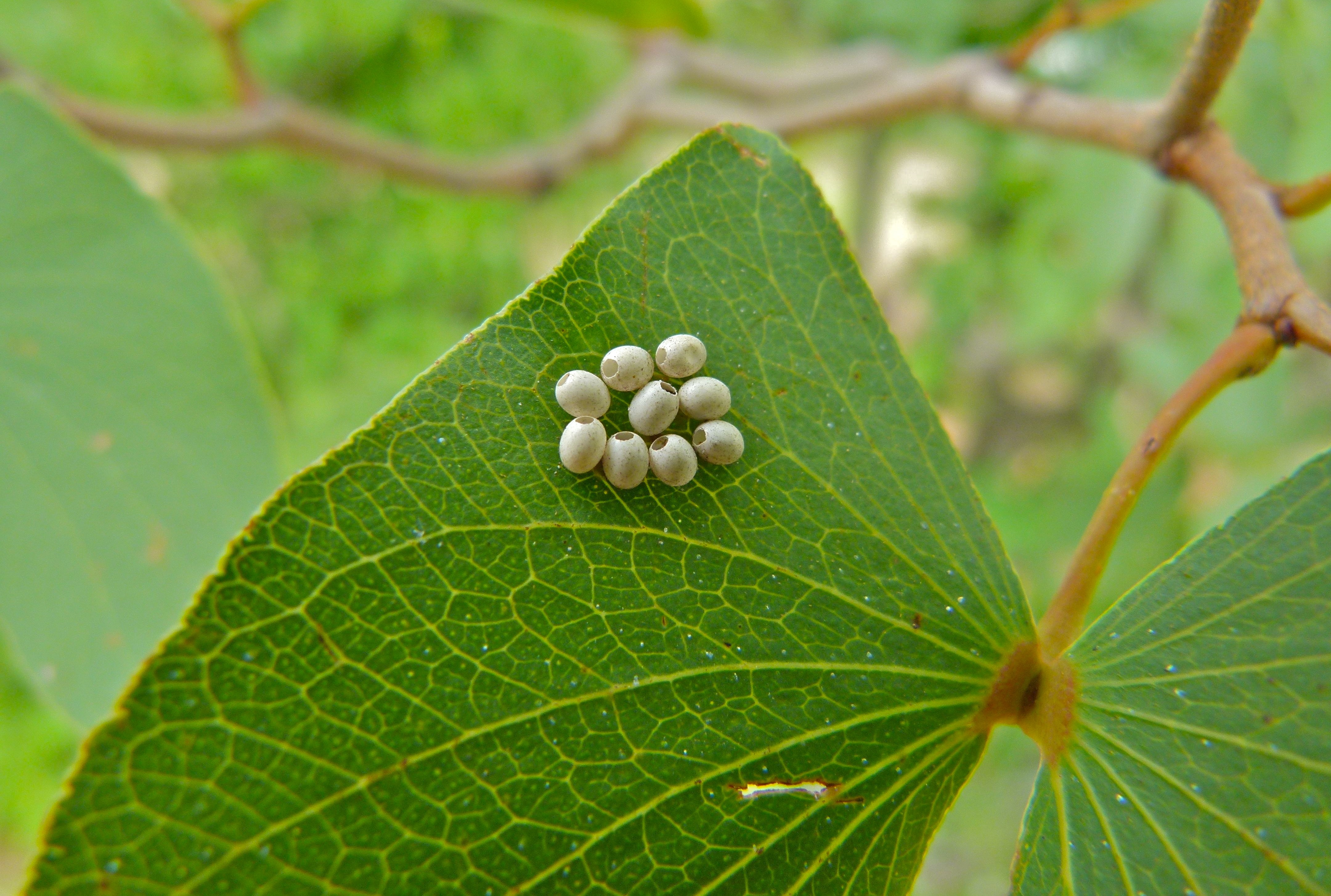
An egg cluster on a mopane leaf

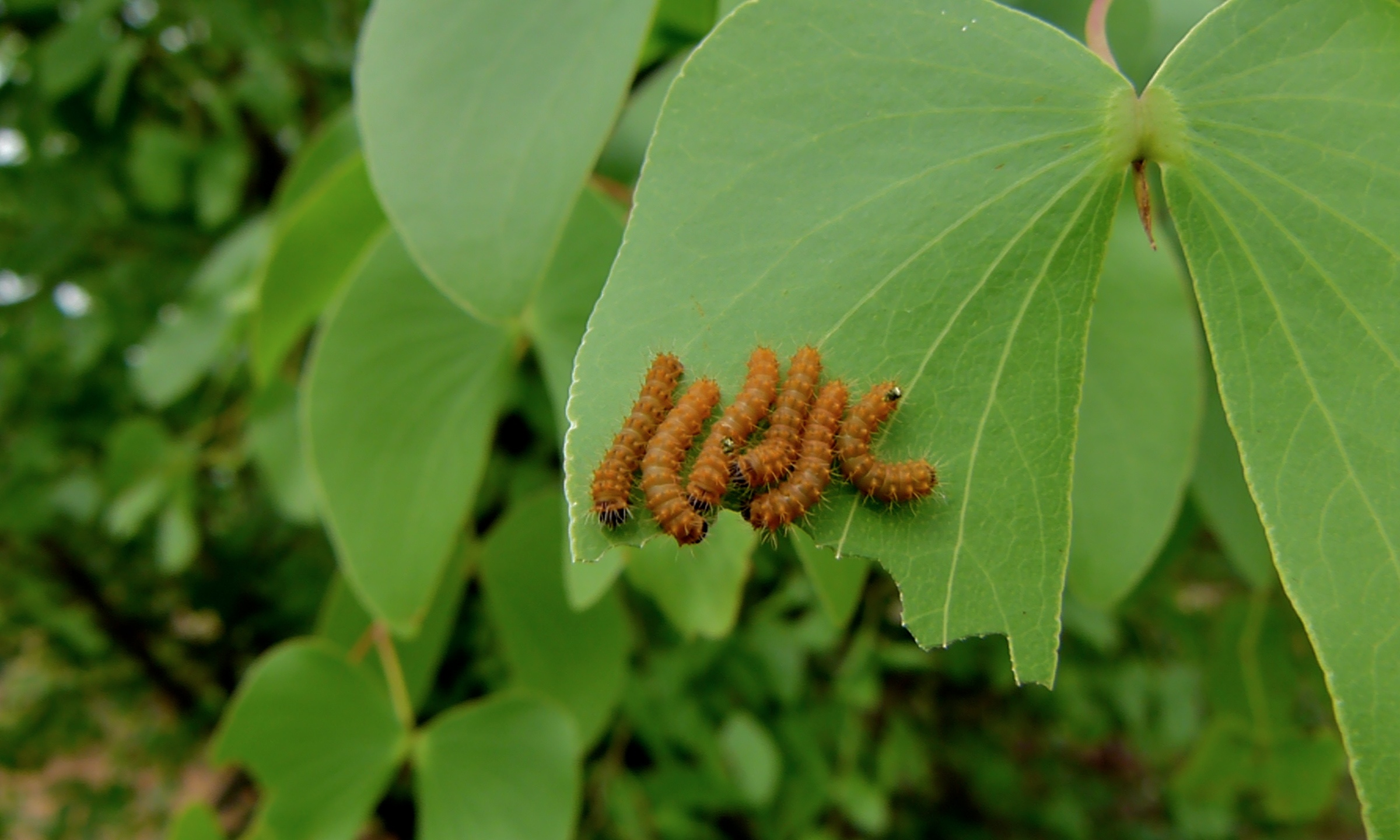
Gregarious first-instar caterpillars feeding on a mopane leaf – the first three instars are always gregarious, while the fourth and fifth are always solitary, a strategy which regulates their physiological constraints

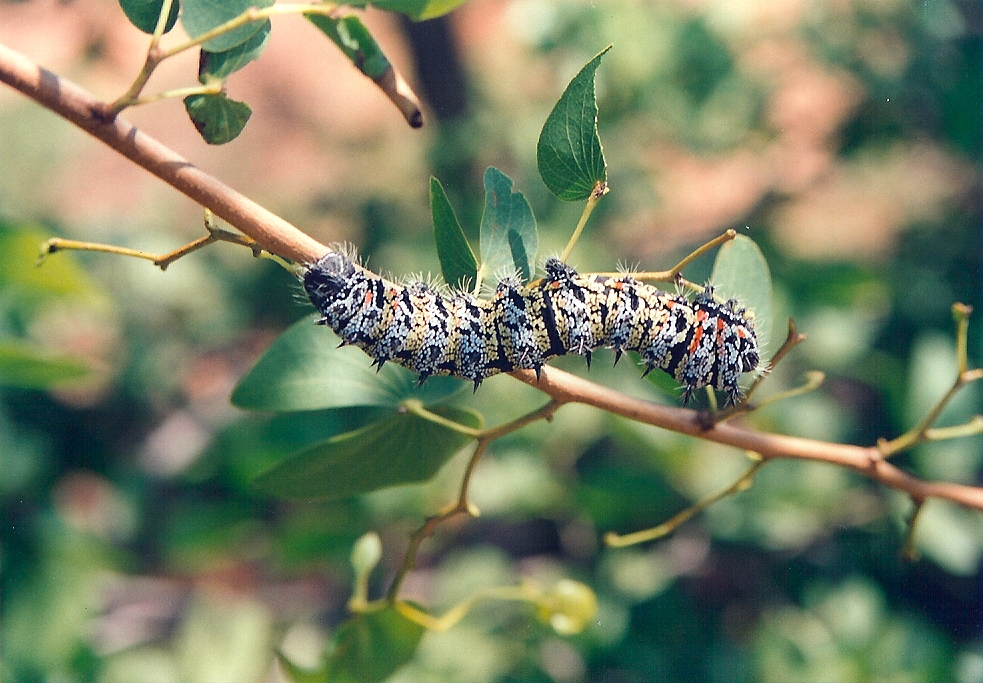
A late instar caterpillar feeding on a mopane tree (head towards the right)

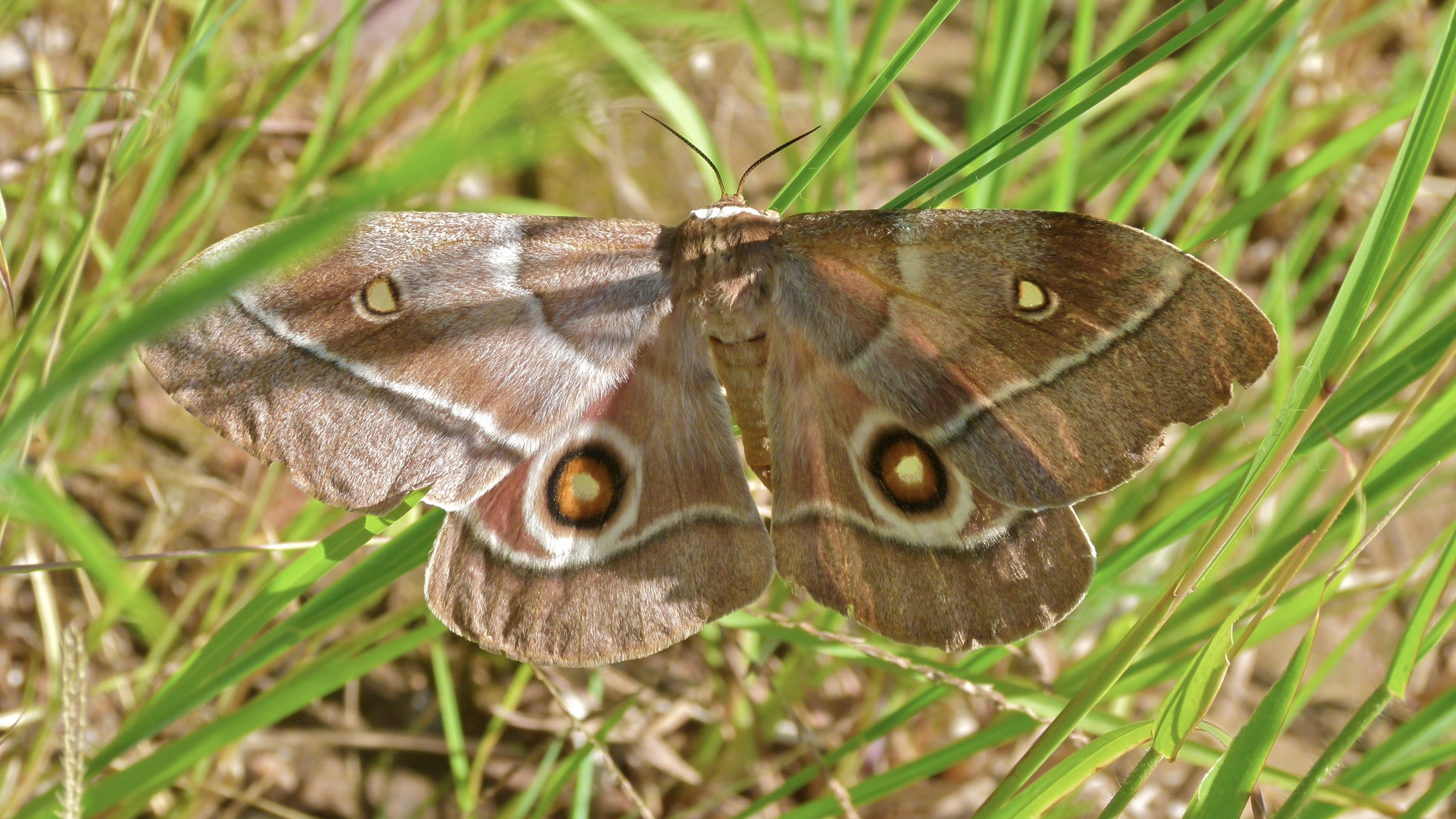
The short-lived emperor moth is the final stage. The unfeathered antennae seen here indicates a female.

Like most caterpillars, the mopane worm's life cycle starts when it hatches in the summer, after which it proceeds to eat the foliage in its immediate vicinity. As the larva grows, it moults four times in its five larval stages, after which the mopane worm is considered most desirable for harvesting. Provided that the larva has not been harvested after its fourth moult, it burrows underground to pupate, the stage at which it undergoes complete transformation to become the adult moth. This stage happens over winter, for a duration of 6 to 7 months, whereafter it emerges at the beginning of summer (November or December).

The adult moths live only for three to four days, during which time they mate and lay their eggs.

== Predators ==
The mopane moths and their eggs often fall prey to various predators as well as disease. Often, more than 40% of a mopane worm's eggs will be attacked by various predators and the caterpillars themselves are susceptible to infection from a virus that has a high mortality rate. The main predators are various birds and humans, which rely on the caterpillars for sustenance.

== Diet ==
Although the mopane worm feeds chiefly on the mopane tree, it is not limited to this diet, and can feed on many other trees that are indigenous to the same regions, as well as exotics like the leaves of the mango tree. Thus the mopane worm is scattered over a fairly large area. As the larval stage of the mopane worm is fairly short, in contrast to other browsing caterpillars, the extensive damage to foliage is easily survived by the tree, in time to be replenished for the next generation of mopane worms. Like most caterpillars, the mopane worm is a voracious eater, and will continue to eat - almost non-stop - until it reaches the next stage of its life cycle, when it burrows underground to undergo metamorphosis.

== As food ==
Mopane worms are hand-picked in the wild, often by women and children. In the bush, the caterpillars are not considered to belong to the landowner (if any), but around a house, permission should be sought from the resident. Chavanduka describes women in Zimbabwe tying a piece of bark to particular trees to establish ownership, or moving the young caterpillars to trees nearer home. When the caterpillar has been picked, it is pinched at the tail end to rupture the innards. The picker then squeezes it like a tube of toothpaste or lengthwise like a concertina, and whips it to expel the slimy, green contents of the gut.

=== Preserving ===
The traditional method of preserving mopane worms is to boil them without adding any extra water after washing and adding a significant amount of salt. They are then dried in the sun or smoked, whereby they gain extra flavour. The industrial method is to can the caterpillars (usually in brine). Tins of mopane worms can be found in rural supermarkets and markets around southern Africa.

=== Eating ===
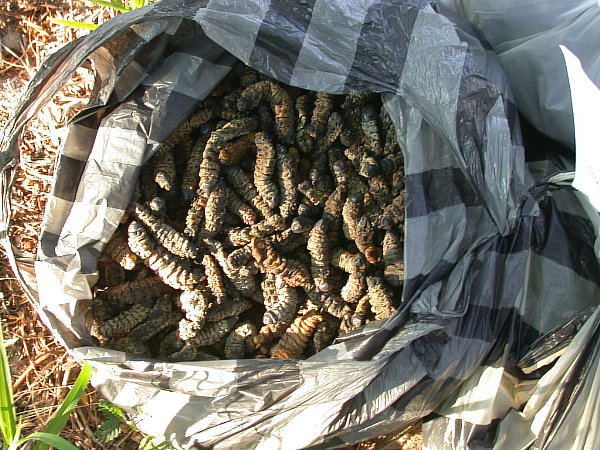
Harvested mopane worms

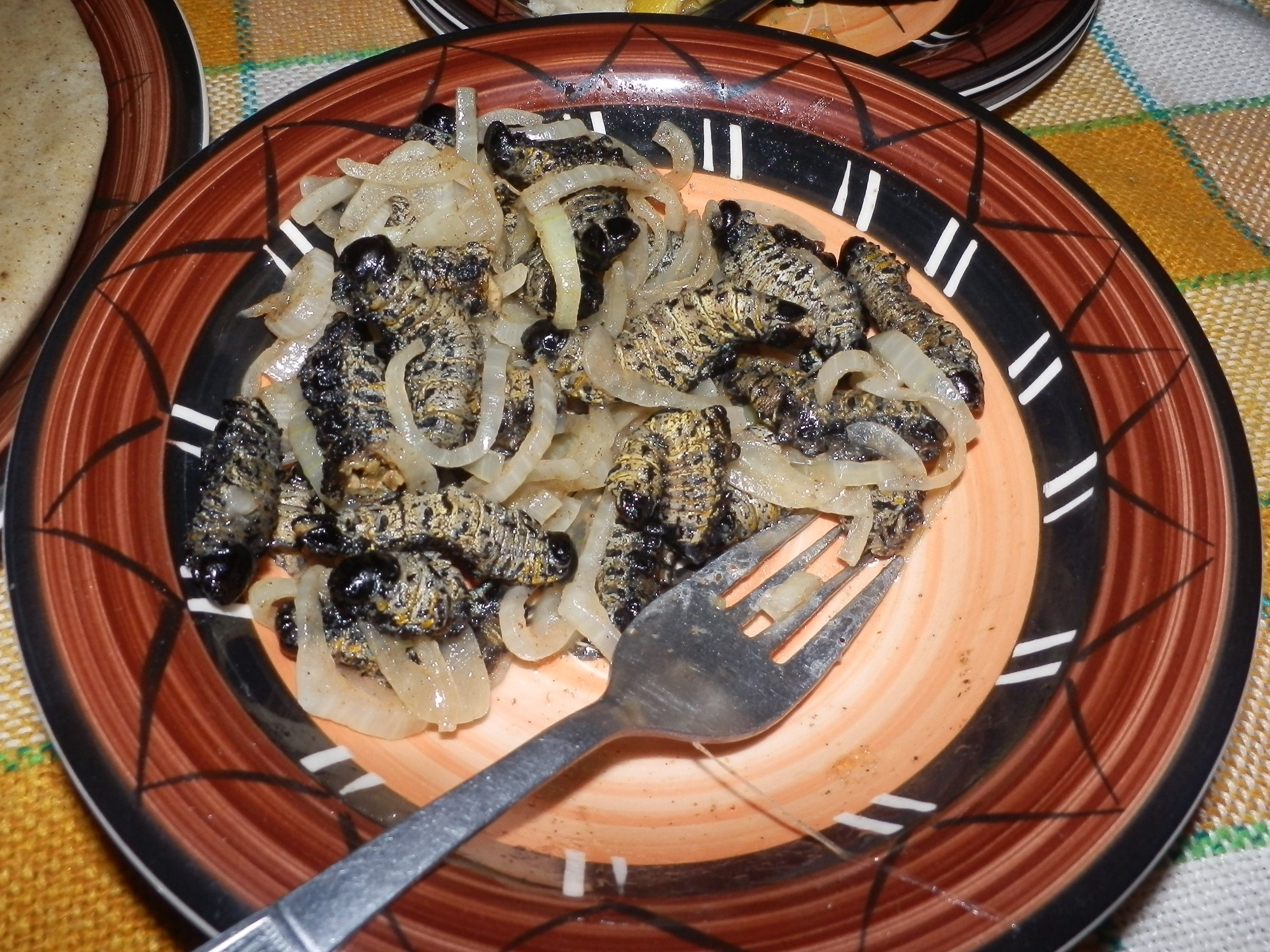
Cooked mopane worms with onions

Dried mopane worms can be eaten raw as a crisp snack. In Botswana people tend not to eat the head. Alternatively, mopane worms can be soaked to rehydrate, before being fried until they are crunchy, or cooked with onion, tomatoes and spices and then served with pap or sadza. The flesh is yellow, and the gut may still contain fragments of dried leaf, which is not harmful to humans. The taste of dried leaves, if not removed, is somewhat reminiscent of tea leaves. Dried mopane worms are frequently canned/packaged in tomato sauce or chili sauce to enhance the flavour.

In November 2015, a Cornell team of food scientists placed third in Brisbane, Australia, at the 2015 Global Business Challenge, by presenting the economic and nutritional benefits of transforming proteins from mopane worms into food.

== Farming and economics ==
The harvesting and sale of mopane worms is a multi-million rand industry in southern Africa. The principal producers are Botswana, Namibia, South Africa (Limpopo Province and Mpumalanga) and Zimbabwe. Typically, the caterpillars are not bred, but picked wherever they occur naturally. It is one of the region's most economically important insects. In the 1990s, hundreds of tons were exported from Botswana and South Africa each year. It is estimated that South Africa alone trades 1.6 million kilograms of mopane worm annually, and that Botswana's involvement in this industry nets it roughly $8 million annually.

Mopane worms are considered to be a profitable harvest, as a mere three kilograms of feed (mopane leaves) will generally yield one kilogram of mopane worms: in contrast, cattle farming requires ten kilograms of feed to generate one kilogram of beef; thus the worms are a low-cost, low-maintenance, high-protein food source.

=== Harvesting ===
Traditionally, mopane worms were harvested for subsistence. Because of the seasonal nature of the occurrence of these edible caterpillars, they are not a year-round food source. However, traditional mopane worm harvesting is evolving to be more commercially driven.

Since the 1950s, commercial farming methods have been applied to the mopane worm harvests, particularly in South Africa. Collectors may organise teams of hundreds of people to hand pick the caterpillars from the trees, after which they are bagged en masse, weighed, and sent off to be processed. Owners of land where mopane worms are found may charge harvesters large fees to enter. Whereas this relationship profits both the commercial harvester and the farmer, it is often to the detriment of the local community for whom the caterpillars may previously have been an important source of food and seasonal income.

=== Sustainability ===
As mopane worms represent an important sector in the local rural economy, they attract large numbers of people who seek to cash in on the profits from selling the insects as food. This circumstance leads to overharvesting, and fewer mopane worms the following year. In some areas, farmers and communities have taken steps to reach a balance, so that each year may yield maximum returns without compromising the following year's harvest.

==== Fears of competition ====
A sure sign of the presence of mopane worms is mopane trees without leaves – sometimes around ninety per cent of leaves. Fenced-in browsing animals may rely on the mopane and on other trees favoured by the caterpillars as an important part of their diet. Some farmers therefore view the mopane worm as a pest competition for their livestock, and attempt to eradicate it with insecticides or other means. However, the caterpillar season is short and the trees sprout the new, tender foliage which browsers prefer, so this problem can be managed in other ways, for example, by working to mutual benefit with the local caterpillar harvesters who will control the worms by harvesting them for food.

==== Reintroduction ====
Some areas once rich in mopane worms no longer have viable populations due to over harvesting and lack of a proper sustainable approach to commercial mopane worm farming. A good case is in Nkayi District, Zimbabwe, where most mopane woodland areas once produced a high yield of these worms, but harvests have decreased drastically. Suggestions of how to reintroduce the species to these areas include re-colonisation. As the adult moth lives only three to four days, during which it must mate and lay eggs, there is only a small window of opportunity to relocate them. If this stage was to be successfully completed, collaboration with local farmers and communities would be required to ensure that the caterpillars are not harvested for a set number of years. It would thus be ensured that the area is adequately repopulated, so that a sustainable harvest is created for the future.

==== Domestication ====
Those in the business have considered domesticating the mopane worms in a manner that is similar to the domestication of silkworms. The industry would thus be less susceptible to the pitfalls that are associated with it, such as climate change, drought and other factors that could compromise a harvest. For a domesticated industry to succeed on a small scale and be accessible to the poorest of the poor, the cost of production would have to be comparable with the cost of wild worms or dried worms at the market.

==== Processing ====
A Mopani Processing centre has been built in Dzumeri, some 34 kilometres from Giyani. The centre was funded by the Council of Scientific and industrial Research (CSIR). In full operation, the Centre should be able to produce large quantities of a variety of mopani snacks and mopani polony.

== See also ==
- Insects as food
- Gynanisa maja - another saturniid moth, caterpillar also eaten, also uses mopane as host.
- Imbrasia cytherea (wikidata) - another African saturniid moth, caterpillar also eaten
