= Loíza (Santurce) =

Subbarrio of Santurce in San Juan, Puerto Rico

Coordinates: 18°26′54″N 66°03′10″W

- Subbarrio
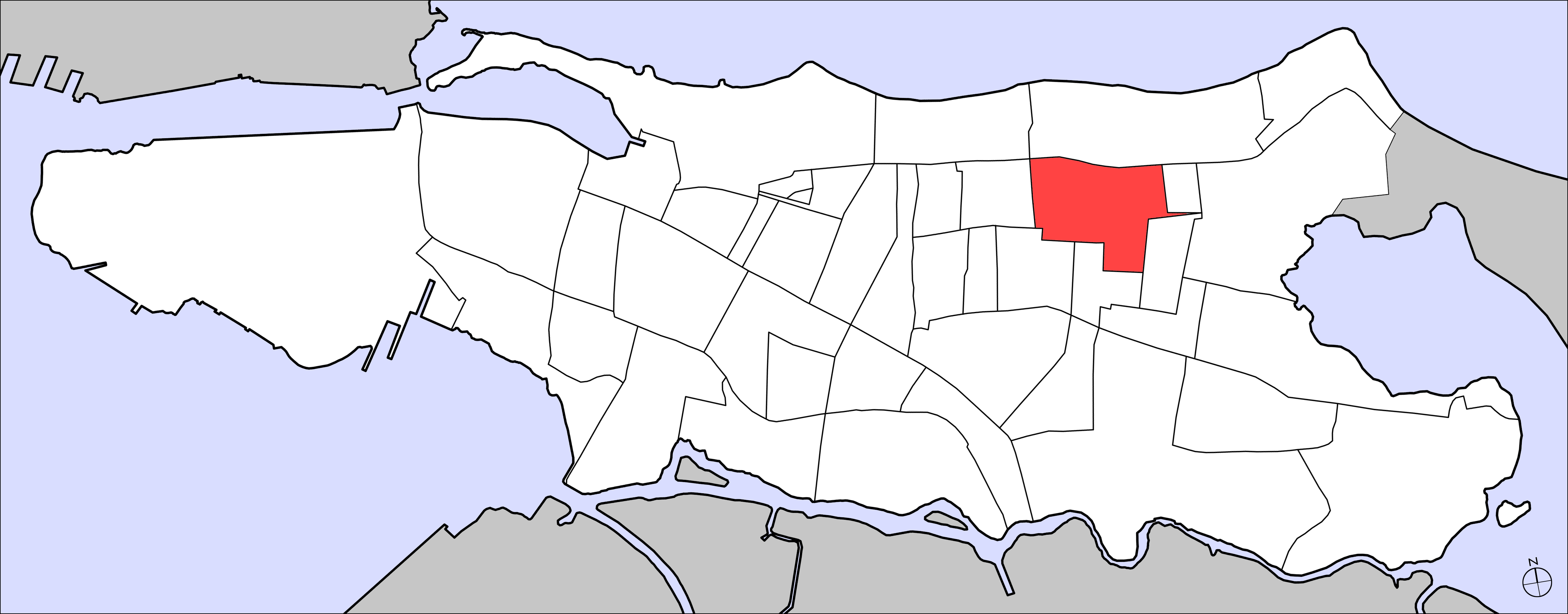
- Commonwealth: Puerto Rico
- Municipality: San Juan
- Barrio: Santurce

Area
  - Total: .13 sq mi (0.34 km^{2})
  - Land: .13 sq mi (0.34 km^{2})
- Elevation: 0 ft (0 m)

Population (2010)
  - Total: 2,073
  - Density: 15,946.2/sq mi (6,156.9/km^{2})
- Source: 2010 Census
- Time zone: UTC−4 (AST)

Loíza is one of the forty subbarrios of Santurce, San Juan, Puerto Rico.

== Demographics ==
In 1940, Loíza had a population of 5,652.

In 2000, Loíza had a population of 2,139.

In 2010, Loíza had a population of 2,073 and a population density of 15,946.2 persons per square mile.

== Description ==
Loíza is bound on the north by the Loíza Street, (integral part of a section that dates back to the 18th century), the south with Expreso Baldorioty de Castro, the east with Betances and Añasco Streets, and to the west by San Jorge Street.

The urban pattern of this area has been eroded by construction on the south side of Baldorioty de Castro freeway which separated this area from Villa Palmeras neighborhood. Before its construction many of the perpendicular streets south of Loíza continued ascending without interruption all the way to Avenida Eduardo Conde.

Although several institutional structures of architectonic value and historical importance are located mainly throughout calle Loíza, the community of Loíza is characterized by colorful homes of the populace, with some very good examples with front concrete verandahs. Almost all consist of one or two floors. The concentration and quality of these residences characterize Loíza as one of the best examples of vernacular “Santurce” architecture of intimate Caribbean influences. Loíza has been subject to gentrification in the past decade.

== See also ==
- List of communities in Puerto Rico
- Vernacular architecture
