= Bolívar (Santurce) =

Subbarrio of Santurce in San Juan, Puerto Rico

Coordinates: 18°26′33″N 66°04′11″W

- Subbarrio
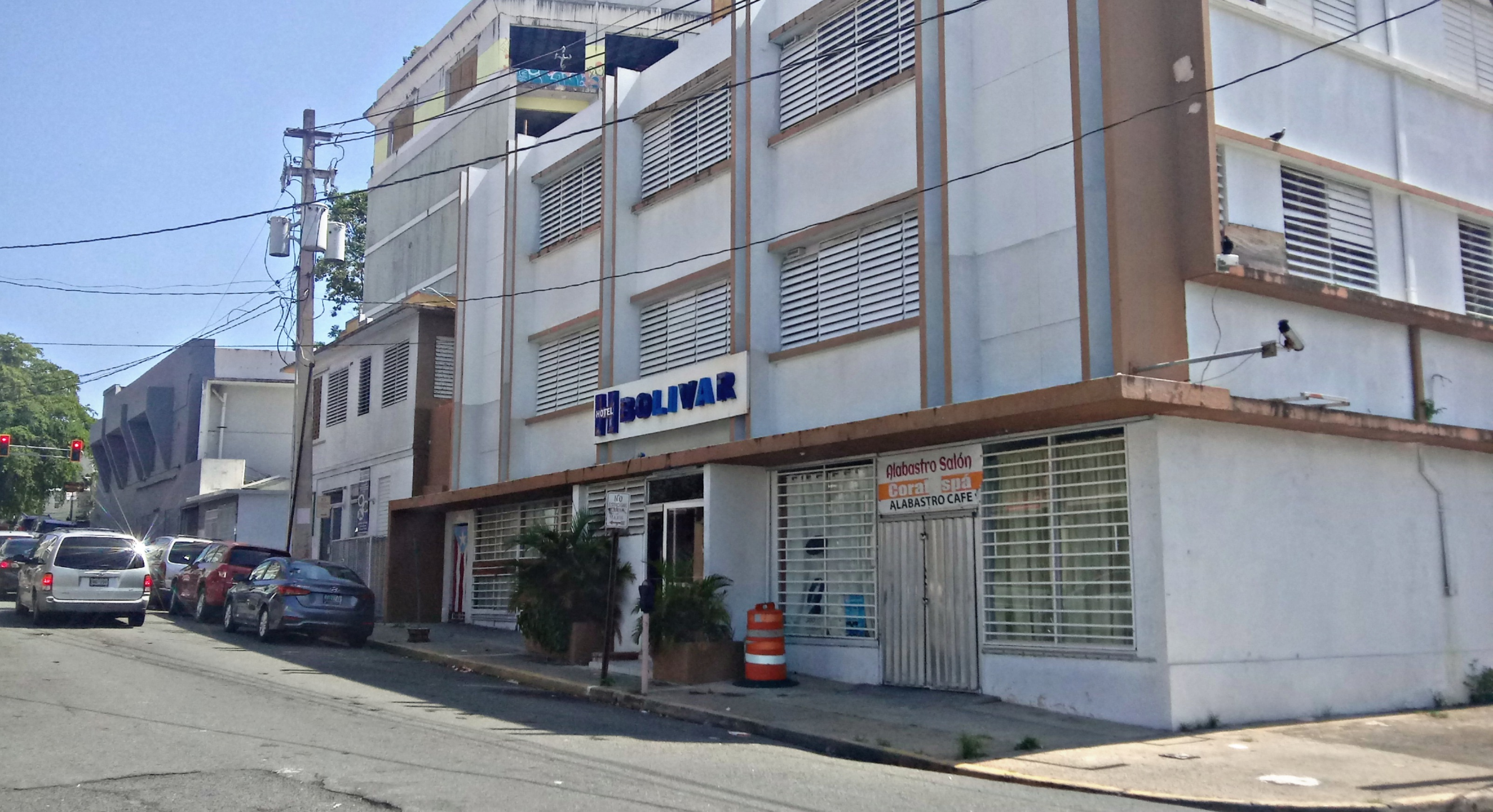
- Hotel Bolivar in Bolivar, Santurce

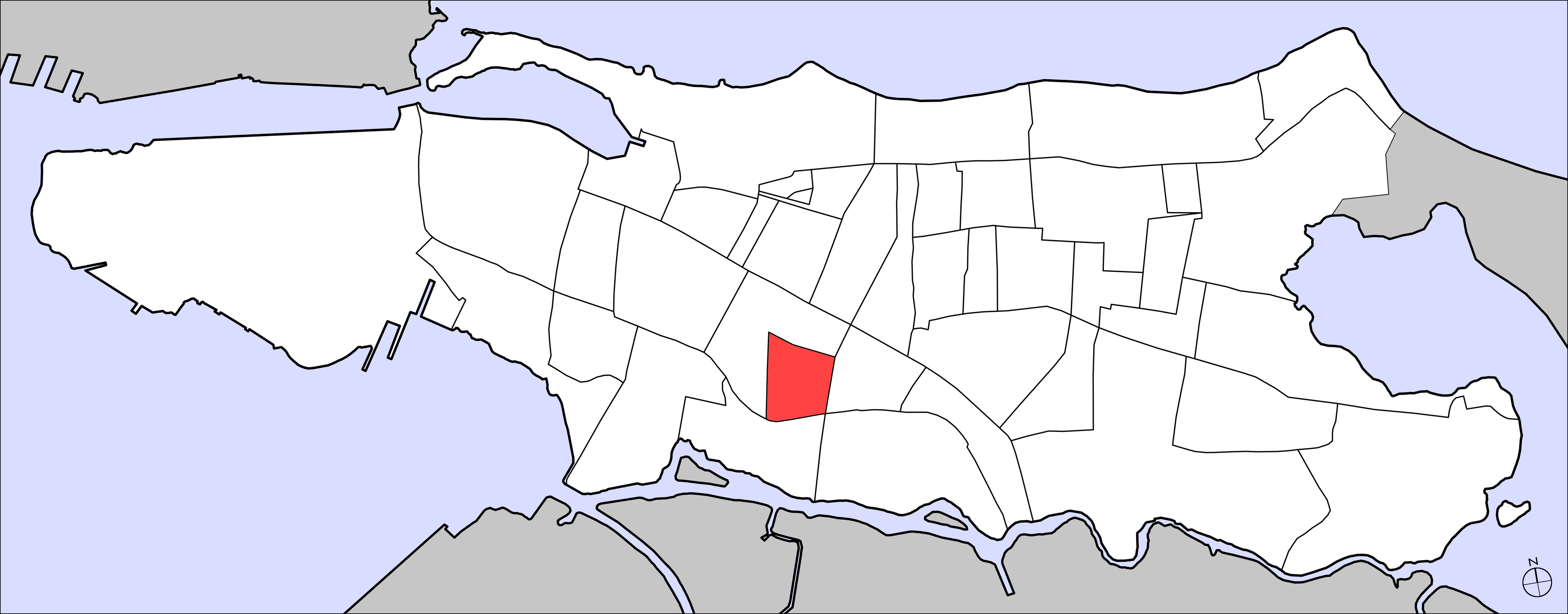
- Location of Bolivar in Santurce shown in red
- Commonwealth: Puerto Rico
- Municipality: San Juan
- Barrio: Santurce

Area
  - Total: .07 sq mi (0.18 km^{2})
  - Land: .07 sq mi (0.18 km^{2})
  - Water: 0 sq mi (0 km^{2})
- Elevation: 33 ft (10 m)

Population (2010)
  - Total: 921
  - Density: 13,157.1/sq mi (5,080.0/km^{2})
- Source: 2010 Census
- Time zone: UTC−4 (AST)

Bolívar is one of the forty subbarrios of Santurce, San Juan, Puerto Rico.

== Demographics ==
In 1940, Bolívar had a population of 1747.

In 2000, Bolívar had a population of 1,223.

In 2010, Bolívar had a population of 921 and a population density of 13,157.1 persons per square mile.

== See also ==
- List of communities in Puerto Rico
