= Santurce, San Juan, Puerto Rico =

Barrio of San Juan, Puerto Rico

Santurce
- Barrio
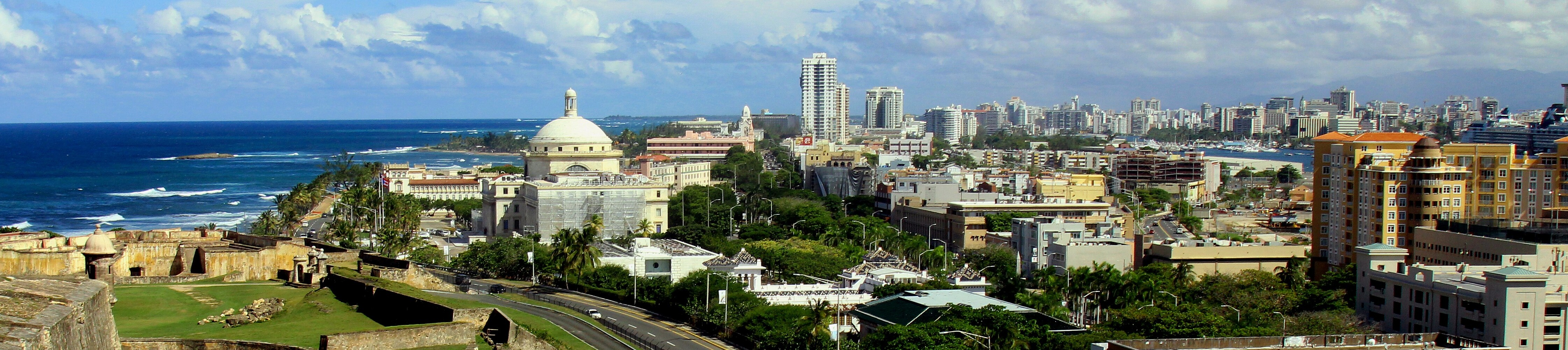
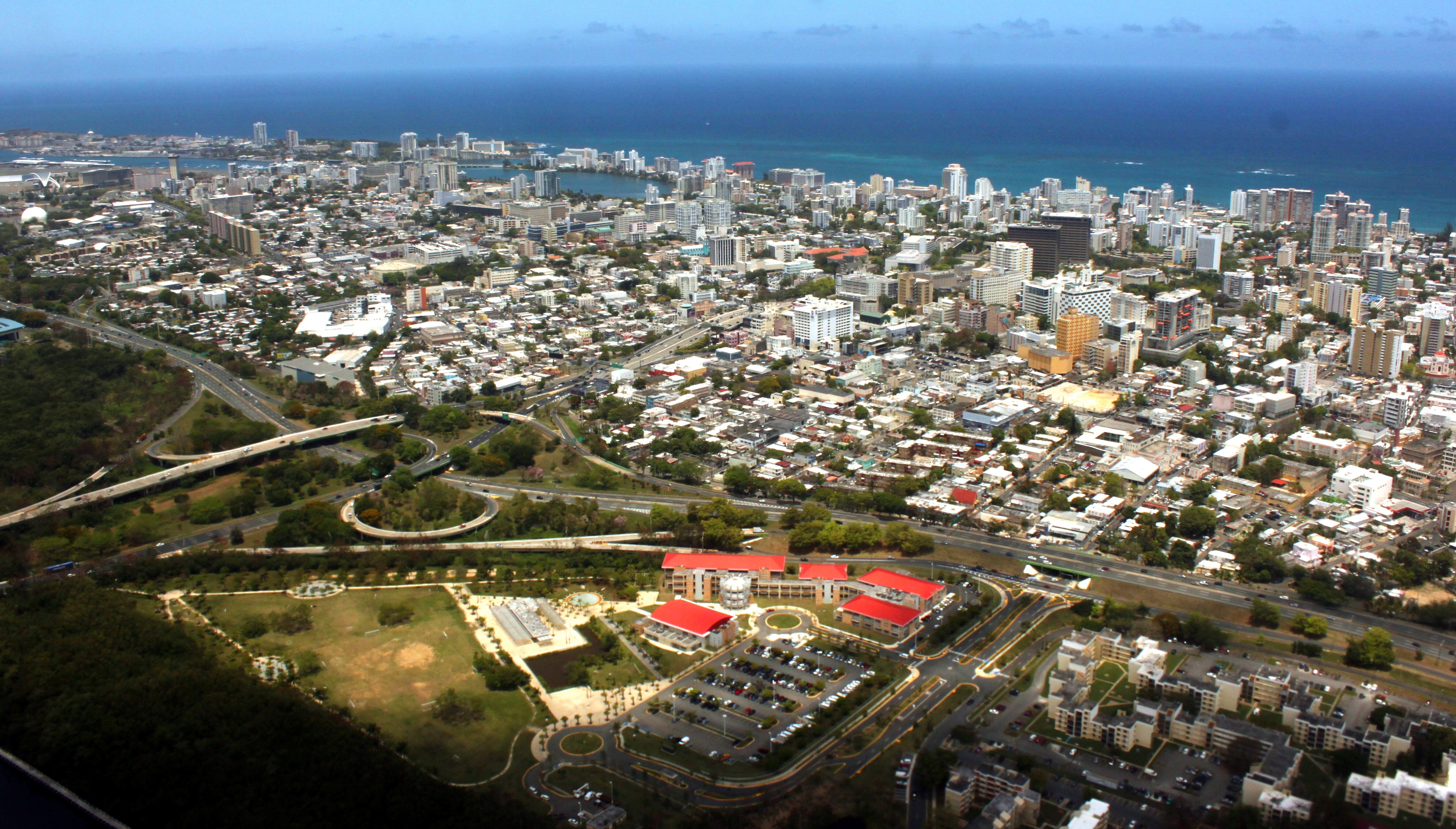
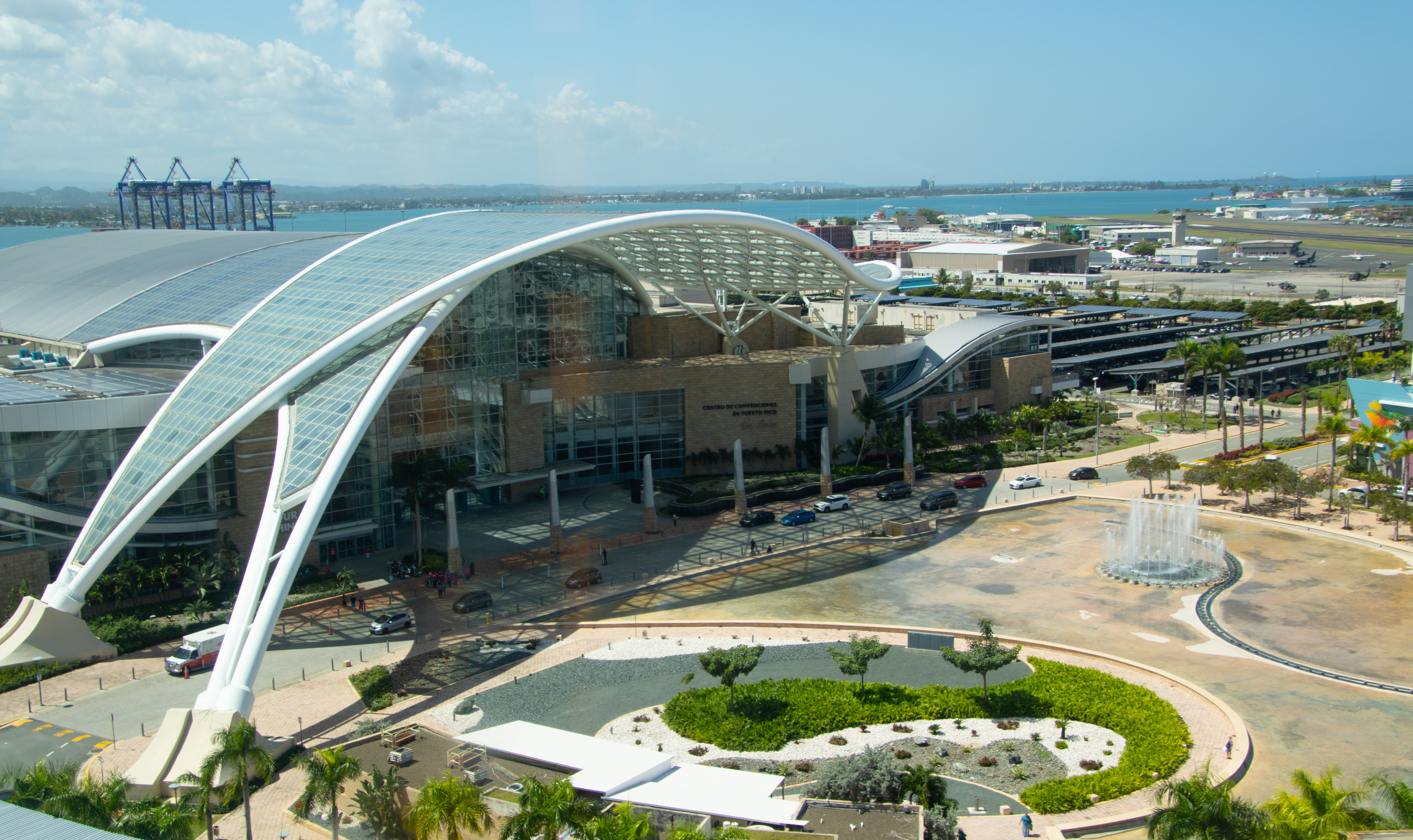
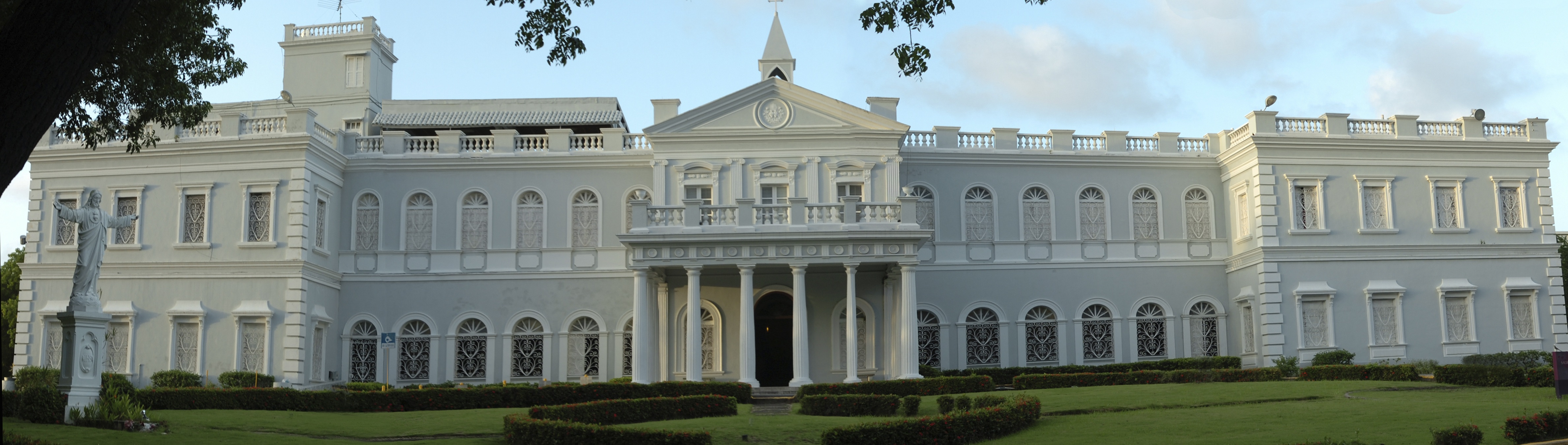
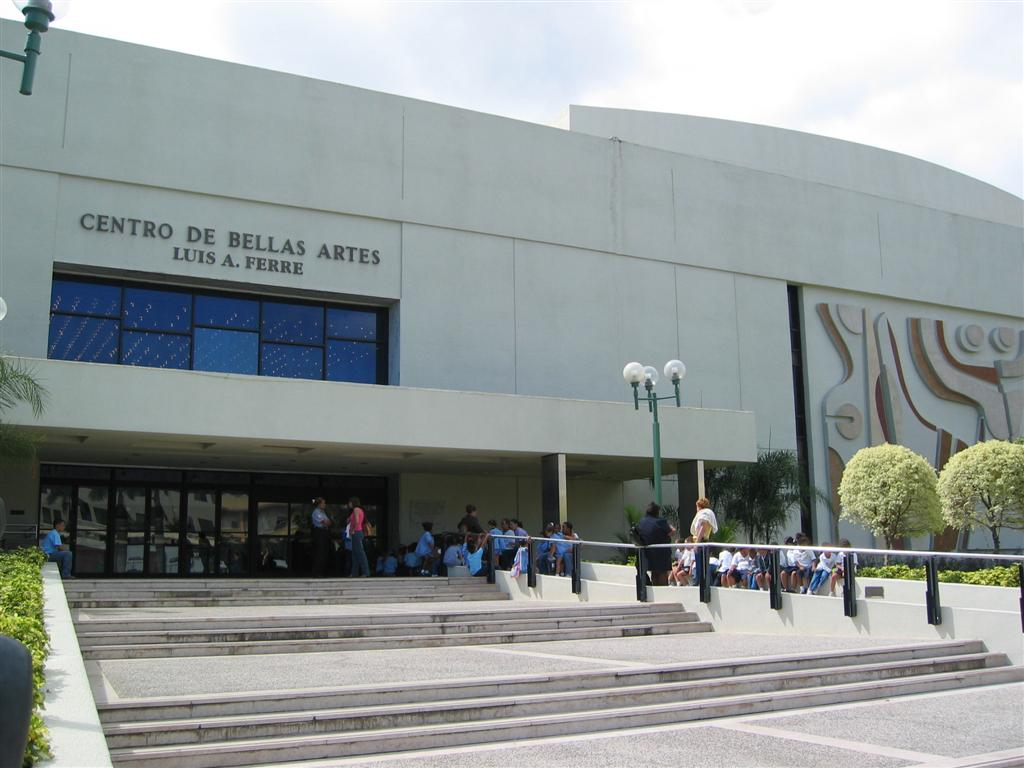
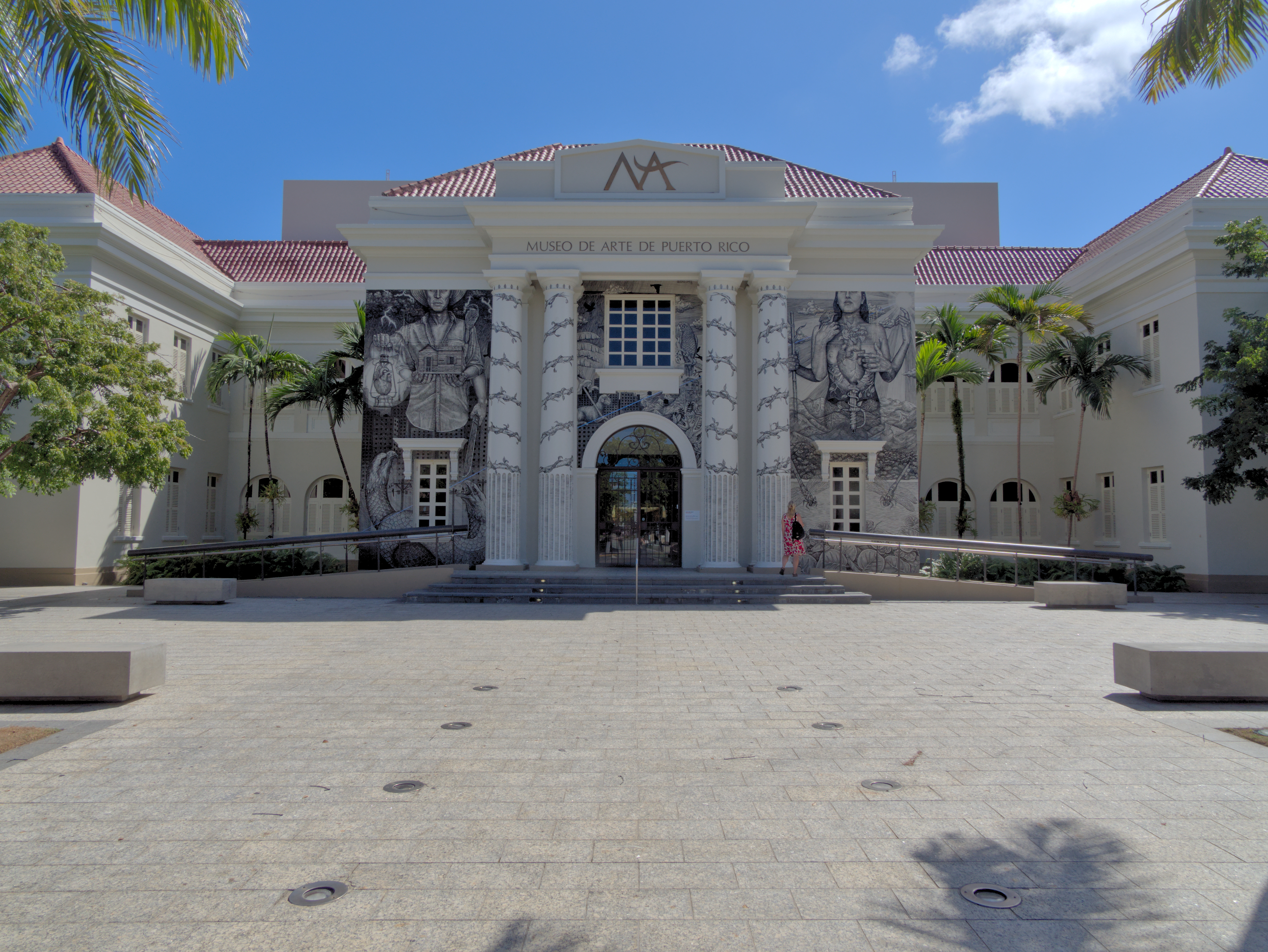
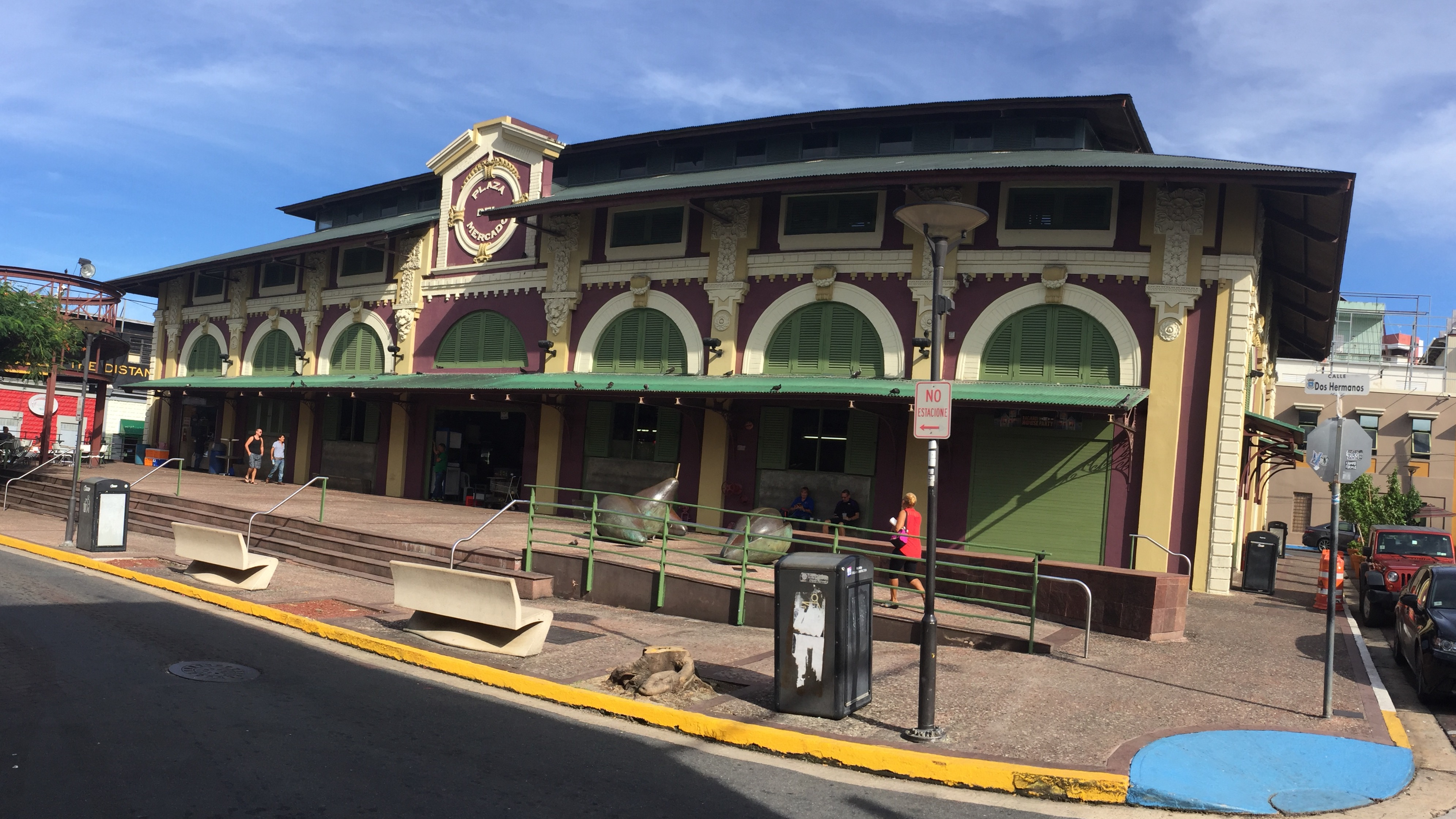
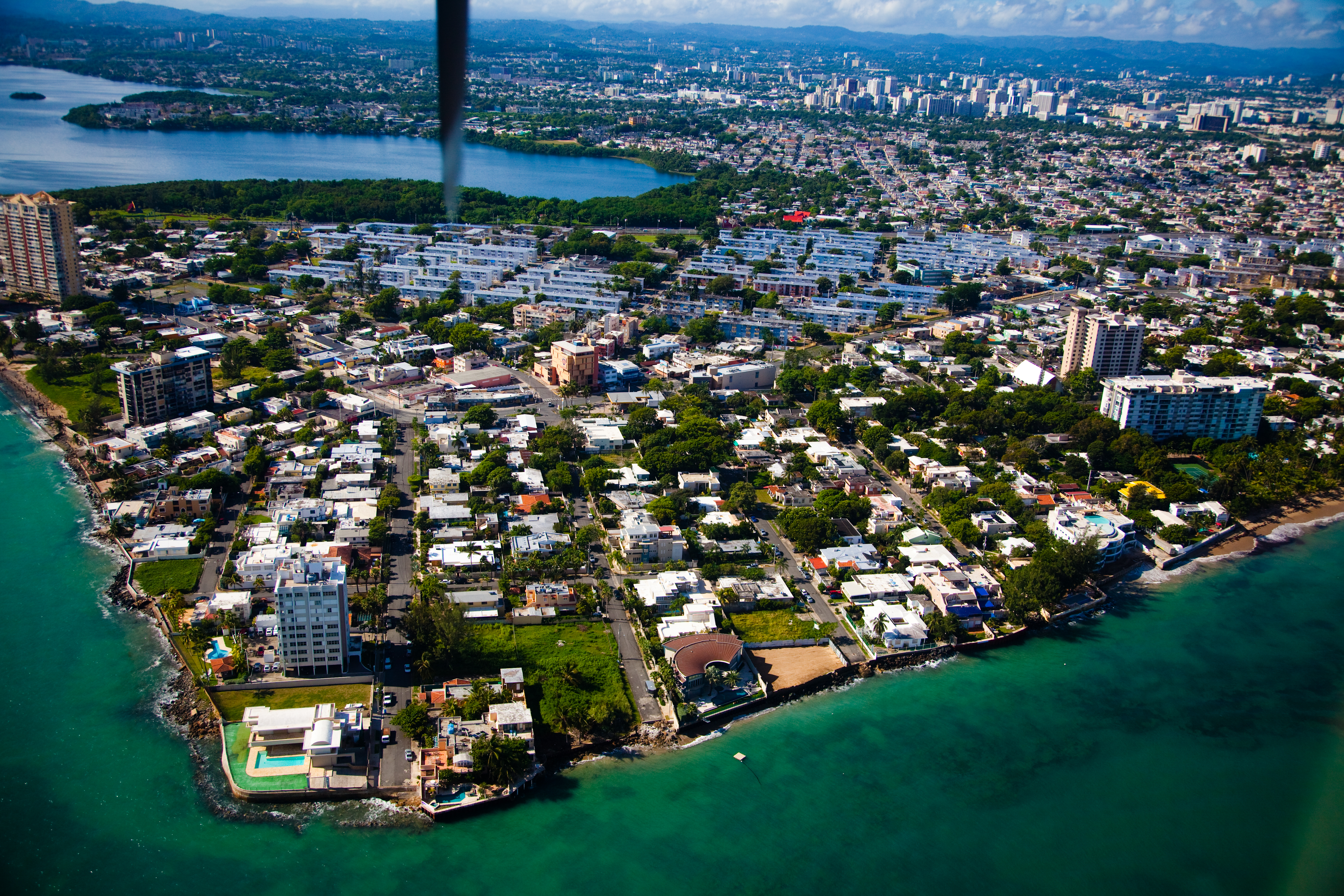
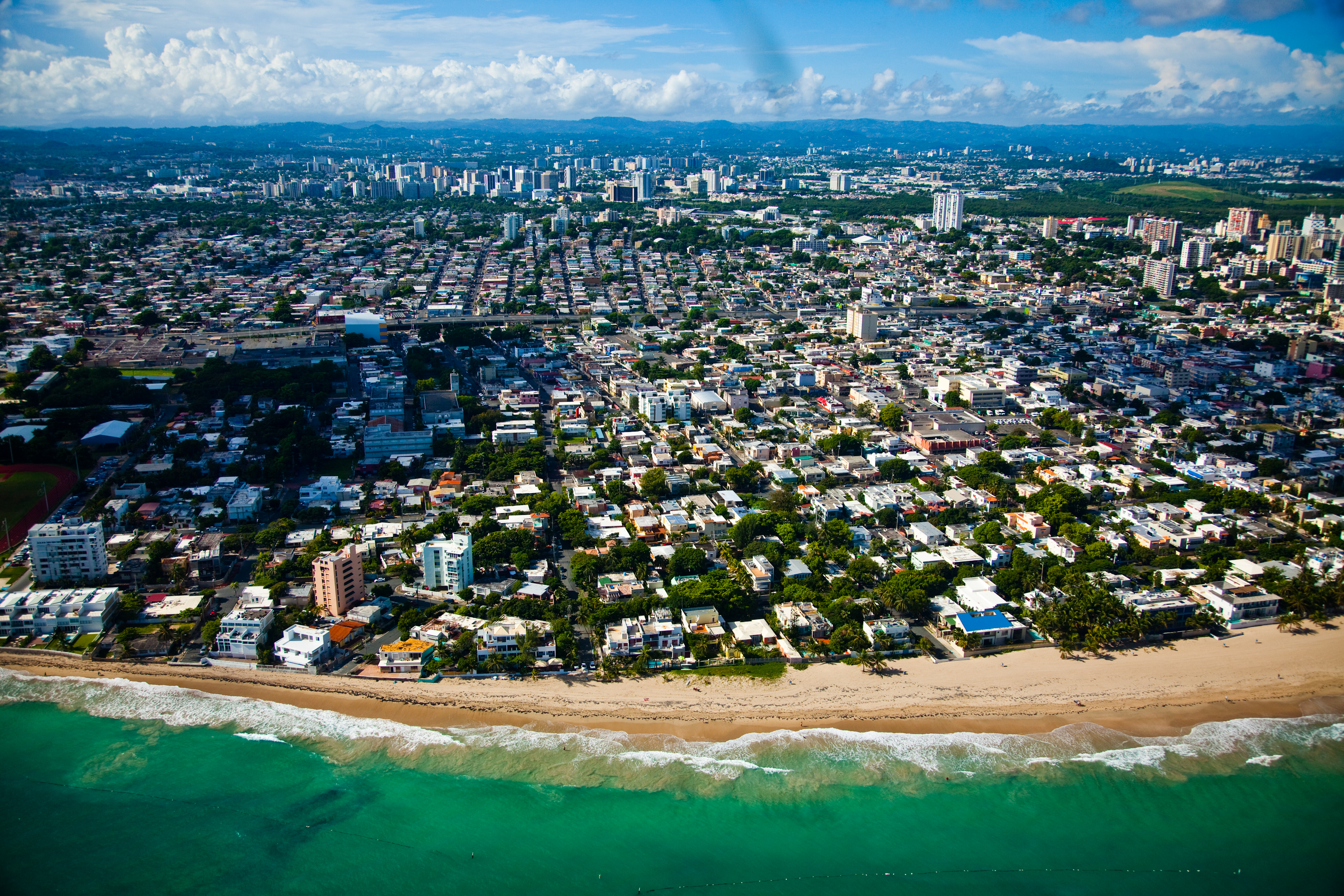
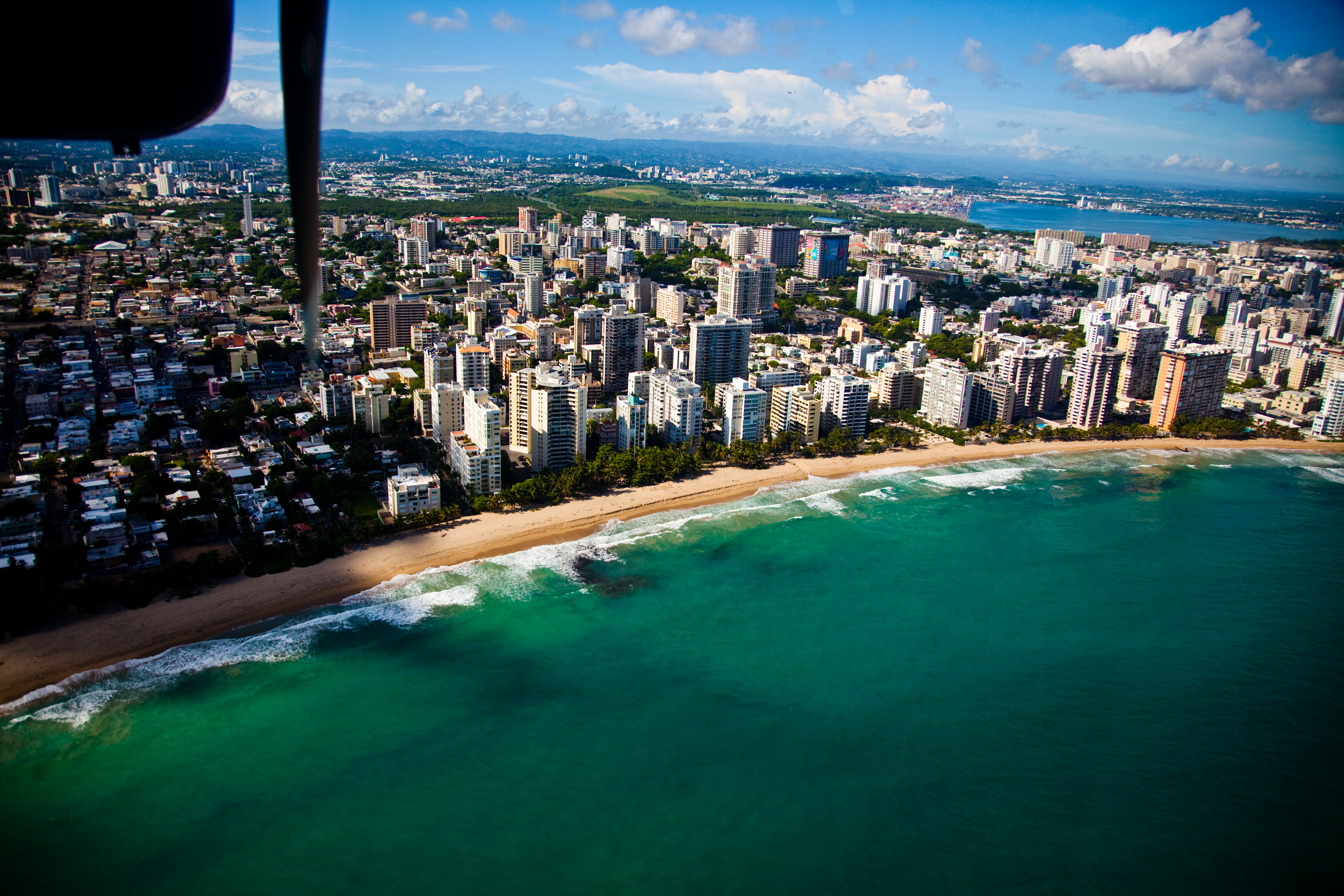
- Santurce skyline (background) from San Cristóbal fortress of Old San Juan historic quarter in San Juan Islet Western Santurce, including Condado, Miramar, Isla Grande, and Minillas districts Convention Center Universidad del Sagrado Corazón Arts Center Art Museum La Placita market Las Marías and Shanghai districts Ocean Park and Loíza districts Parque and San Mateo districts

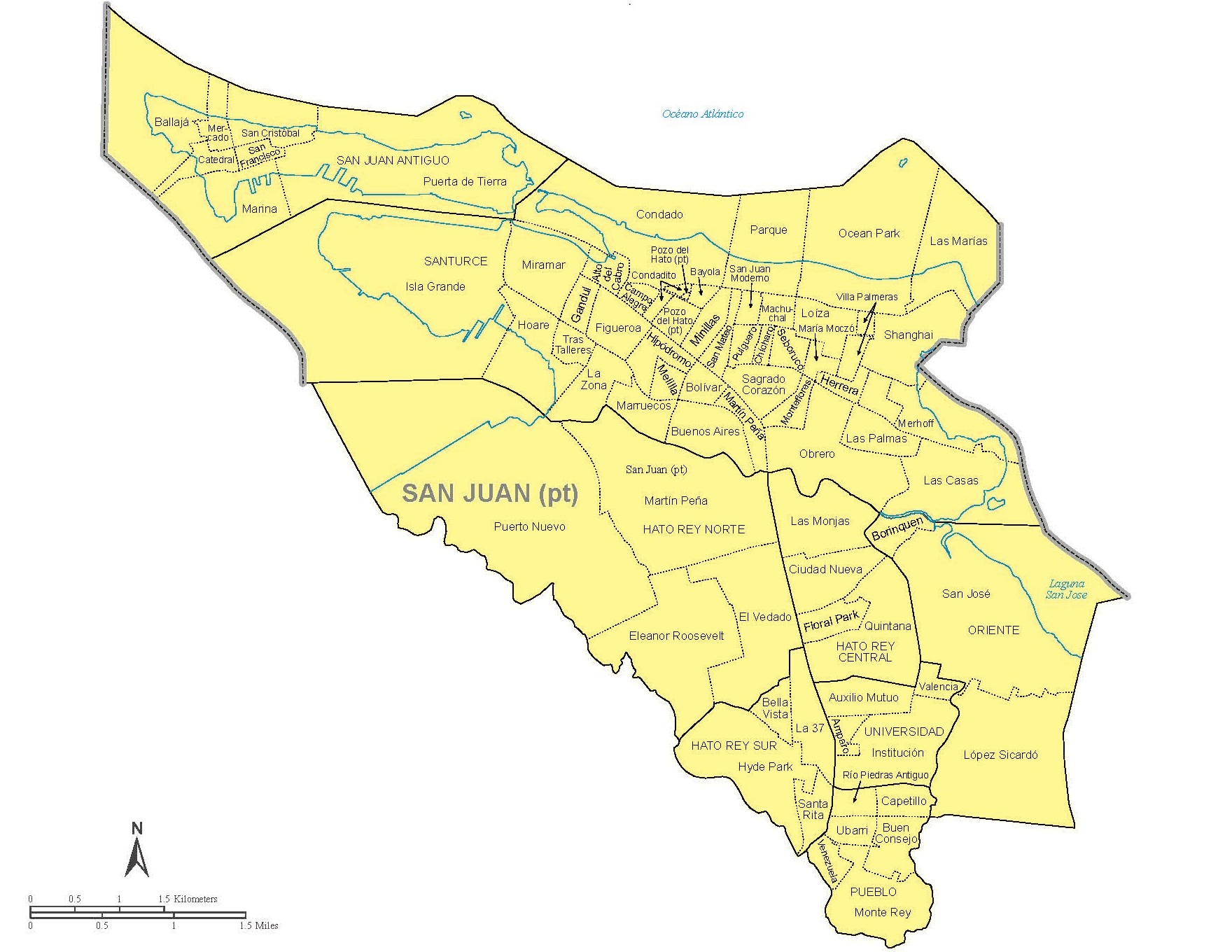
- Santurce and districts (center) bounded by San Juan Antiguo (northwest) and Hato Rey (south) within northern San Juan
- Interactive map of Santurce
- Coordinates: 18°26′48″N 66°04′08″W
- Commonwealth: Puerto Rico
- Municipality: San Juan

Area
  - Total: 8.70 sq mi (22.53 km^{2})
  - Land: 5.24 sq mi (13.57 km^{2})
  - Water: 3.46 sq mi (8.96 km^{2})
- Elevation: 49 ft (15 m)

Population (2020 census)
  - Total: 69,469
  - Density: 13,257.4/sq mi (5,118.7/km^{2})
- Time zone: UTC−4 (AST)
- ZIP Codes: 00907, 00908, 00909, 00911, 00912, 00913, 00914, 00915, 00916, 00936, 00940

Santurce (Spanish pronunciation: [sanˈtuɾse]) is a highly urbanized, densely populated commercial, residential, cultural, and resort area in Puerto Rico, organized as one of 18 barrios of San Juan, the capital city and municipality of the archipelago and island. Situated in the north-center of the San Juan metro area, north of the Hato Rey business center, east of the Old San Juan historic quarter in San Juan Islet, and west of the Isla Verde resort area, it occupies 40 subbarrios or districts, including the affluent Condado, Isla Grande, Miramar, Parque, and Ocean Park in the northwest, and the impoverished Obrero and Las Casas in the southeast. It is home to the Fernando Luis Ribas Dominicci Airport, Puerto Rico Convention Center, Distrito T-Mobile entertainment center, Universidad del Sagrado Corazón, Residencial Lloréns Torres public housing complex, and La Placita marketplace and nightlife center, among others. With 69,469 residents as of 2020, its population is higher than 69 of 78 municipalities in Puerto Rico.

Santurce comprises the western half of a coastal strip of flatland historically known as Cangrejos (''crabs'') for its abundance of crustaceans. Surrounded by lagoons and channels within the San Juan Bay Estuary, it is bordered by San Juan Islet, site of the Old San Juan historic quarter, and San Juan Bay to the west, Isla Verde district and Los Corozos and San José Lagoons to the east, Hato Rey business center and Martin Peña Channel to the south, and the Atlantic Ocean to the north.

In 1773, it was officially established as the defunct municipality of San Mateo de Cangrejos. Its population primarily consisted of cimarrones or sub-Saharan fugitives slaves original to neighboring islands under English, Dutch, and Danish rule, who were granted liberty and land by Spanish authorities in Puerto Rico during the preceding 100 years. In 1862, it was dissolved into its neighboring municipalities. Isla Verde in the east was merged into Carolina as a subbarrio, Hato Rey in the south into Río Piedras as a barrio, and Santurce in the west into San Juan as a barrio.

Santurce was named after Santurtzi in Spain, the birthplace of Count Pablo Ubarri, a 19th-century Basque businessman and politician based in the barrio, who built the San Juan Tramway, the first passenger steam and electric tramway in the main island operating from Old San Juan through Santurce to Río Piedras, in 1880. In the 20th century, Santurce grew as a key economic and cultural center of San Juan with an influx of businesses, condominiums, hotels, theaters, museums, and schools, becoming one of the most significant areas in Puerto Rico by 1930.

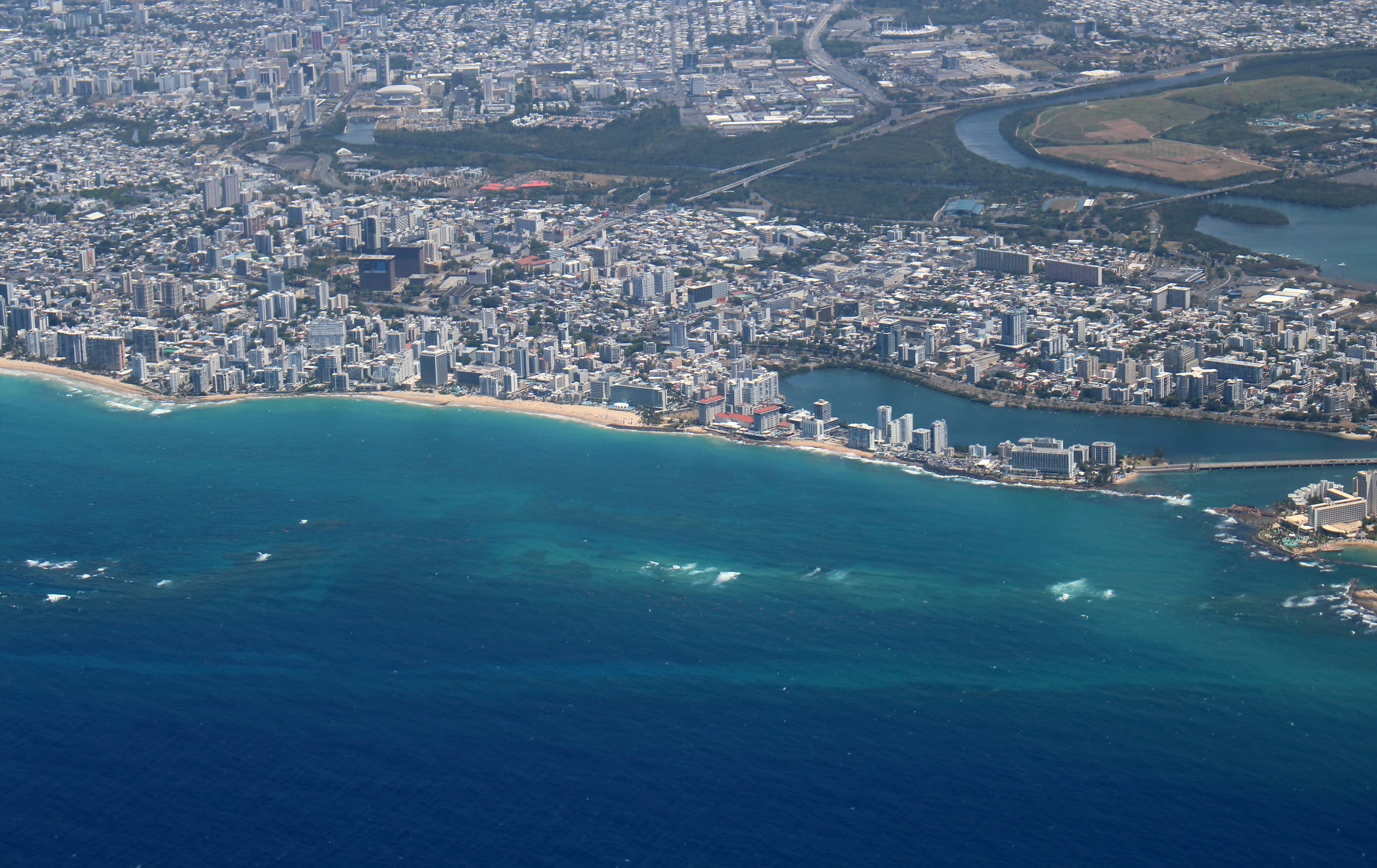
Western Santurce (foreground) from San Juan Islet (right) to Parque district (left), 2016

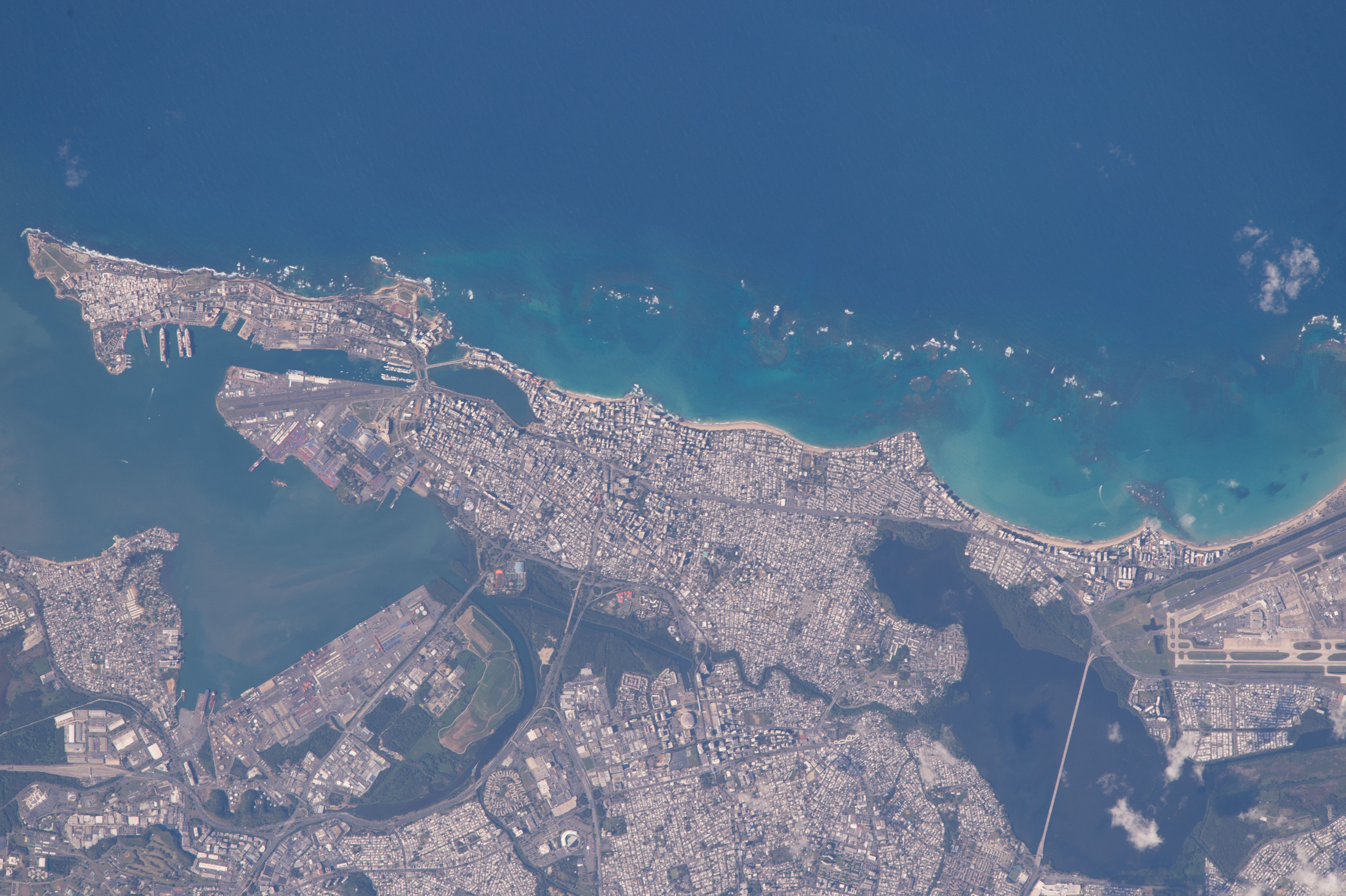
Satellite view from Old San Juan historic quarter (upper left) in San Juan Islet in the San Juan capital municipality to Isla Verde district (right) in the Carolina municipality with Santurce visible (center), 2016

== History ==
=== 16th–18th centuries ===
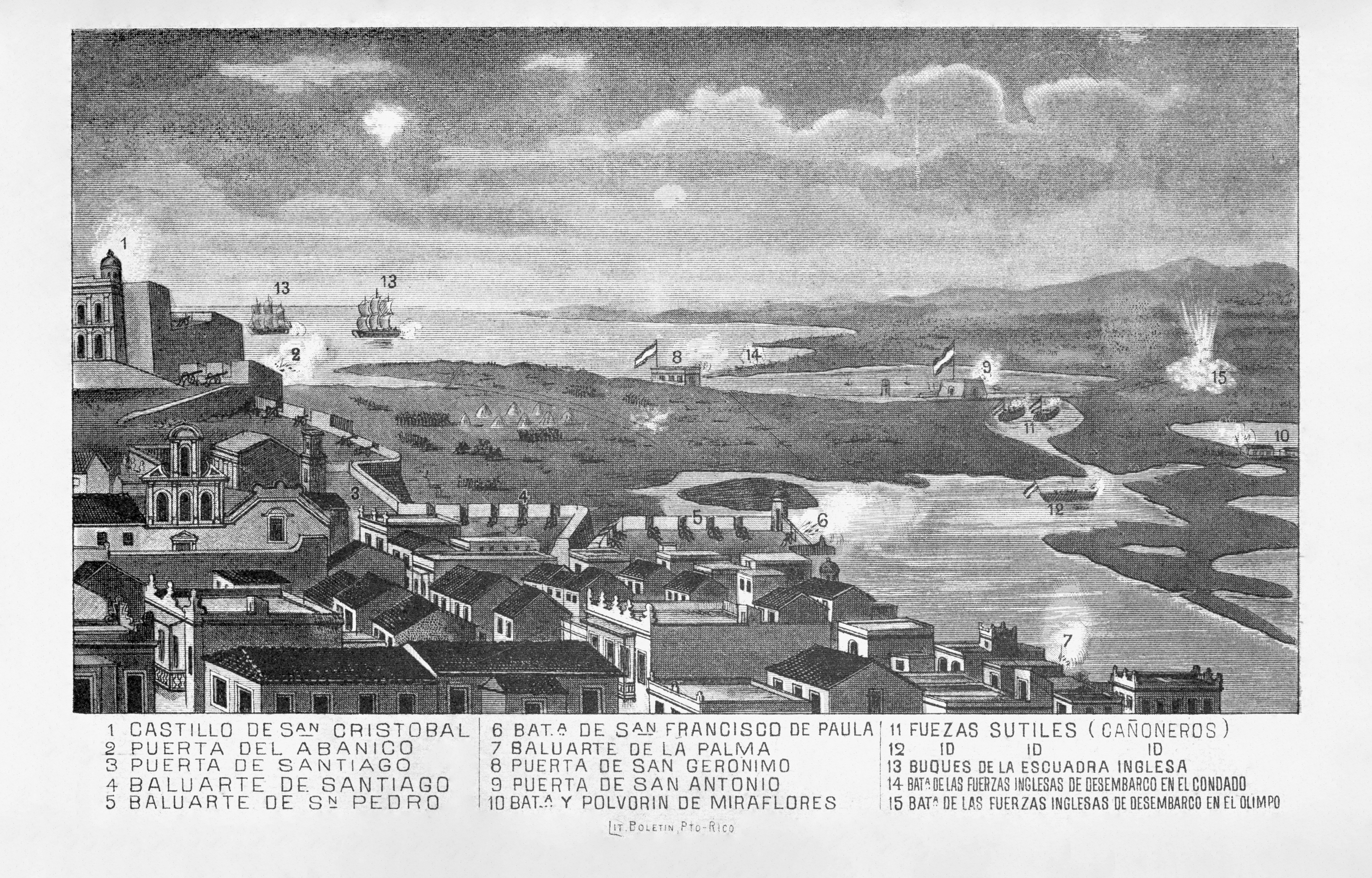
Battle of San Juan (1797)

The history of the settlement of Santurce is closely linked to that of Old San Juan due to its location as the closest entry point from the Islet of San Juan to the Puerto Rican mainland and for its location between the San Juan Bay and the Atlantic coast. San Antonio Bridge, the first bridge connecting the islet to the main island was built across Condado Lagoon in the 1560s, during a period of infrastructural and military development of San Juan that also saw the edification of its city walls. Fortín San Antonio was also built during this time in order to defend the city from both northeast foreign invaders and land-based indigenous attacks.

The area that would become Santurce was first settled between the end the 16th century and throughout the 17th century by both freed and escaped slaves coming from both rural Puerto Rico and other islands throughout the West Indies. The town of San Mateo de Cangrejos ("Saint Matthew" of the Crabs) was officially founded in 1760 by Basque settlers who formally acquired the land around what are today the subbarrios of San Mateo, Pulguero and Minillas. The area around what is today Isla Grande was also developed during this time with projects such as the Miraflores armory, established as part of military infrastructure developments by Alejandro O'Reilly. Santurce was captured by the British under the command of Ralph Abercromby on April 18, 1797, during the early stages of the 1797 siege of San Juan, but it was later liberated on May 1.

=== 19th century ===
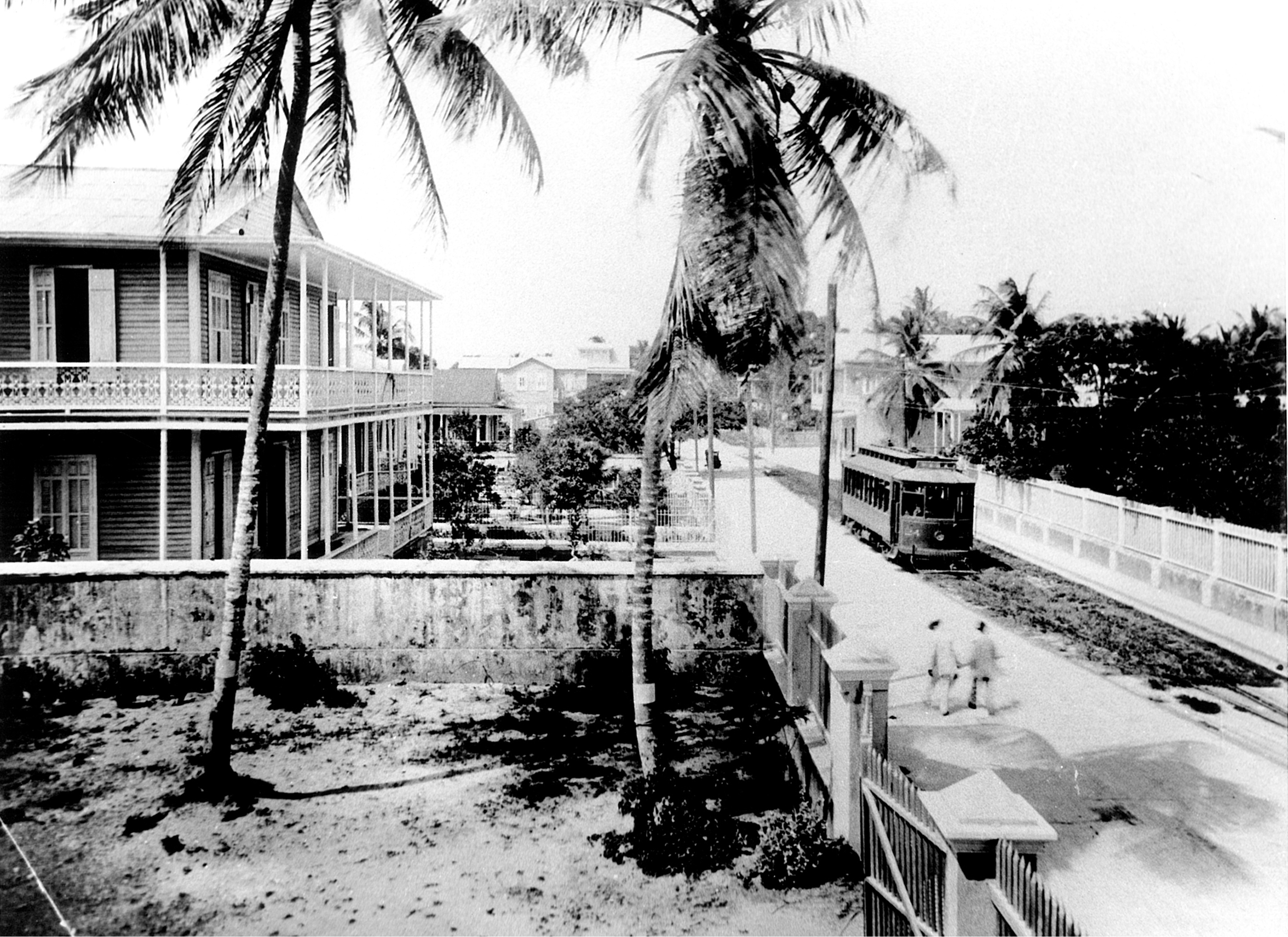
San Juan Tramway

Santurce saw further urban growth during the early decades of the 19th century thanks to the establishment of the Camino Real, a military road between San Juan and the town of Río Piedras (then called El Roble) built in 1810; this stretch of road now known as Ponce de León Avenue would prove to be of extreme importance in the urban history of the city of San Juan. The town church, San Mateo de Cangrejos of Santurce Parish, would also be established during this time in 1832. The establishment of the telegraph network in 1858 further modernized the town, which by 1863 was formally annexed to the municipality of San Juan.

In 1876, an engineer from the port town of Santurtzi in Spain's autonomous Basque Country region known as Pablo Ubarri arrived on the island to help in the construction of a railroad system and a steam tramway between San Juan and the town of Río Piedras through the center of San Mateo de Cangrejos. He was later granted the title of Count of Santurce by the Spanish Crown. With the newly acquired title and influence, the district was renamed after his title, county of Santurce (condado de Santurce), a decision that has caused controversy ever since. The tourist district of Condado (Spanish for 'county') traces its etymology to this title. The steamway service developed by the count in 1878 further helped the population of the barrio to considerably grow. Other key developments during this time were the construction of a civil hospital in 1885 (today the location of the Museum of Art of Puerto Rico), the establishment of street lighting and the electric grid in 1893, the installation of phone infrastructure in 1897, and the inauguration of both railway service and the Carretera Central linking San Juan to Ponce in 1898.

The Treaty of Paris in 1898 saw the culmination of the Spanish-American War, with Puerto Rico now becoming a colony of the United States. In 1899, the United States Department of War conducted a census of Puerto Rico, finding that the population of Santurce was 5,840.

=== 20th century ===
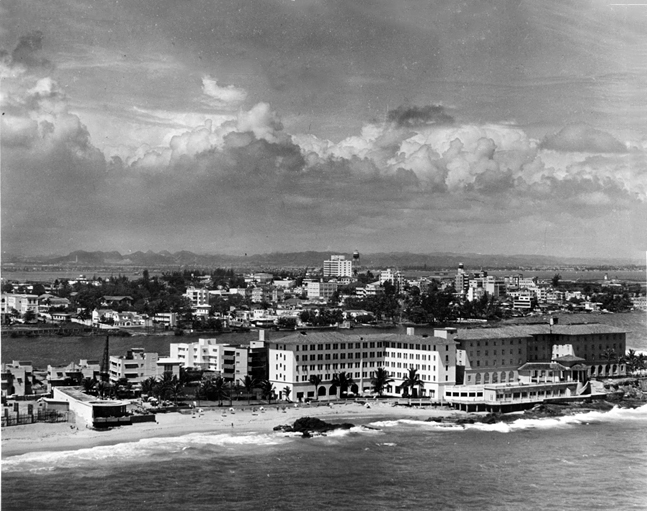
Condado Vanderbilt Hotel in 1950.

The United States Army established Camp Las Casas, in the area of Las Casas in 1904. The camp was the main training base of the Porto Rico Regiment of Infantry (on January 15, 1899, the military government changed the name of Puerto Rico to Porto Rico and on May 17, 1932, U.S. Congress changed the name back to "Puerto Rico") The Porto Rico Regiment of Infantry was a U.S. Army Regiment which was later renamed the "65th Infantry Regiment". The 65th Infantry Regiment was segregated. However, a separate division called the 375th Regiment enlisted Black soldiers. The base continued in operation until 1946, when it was finally closed. Residencial Las Casas would later be developed on this location.

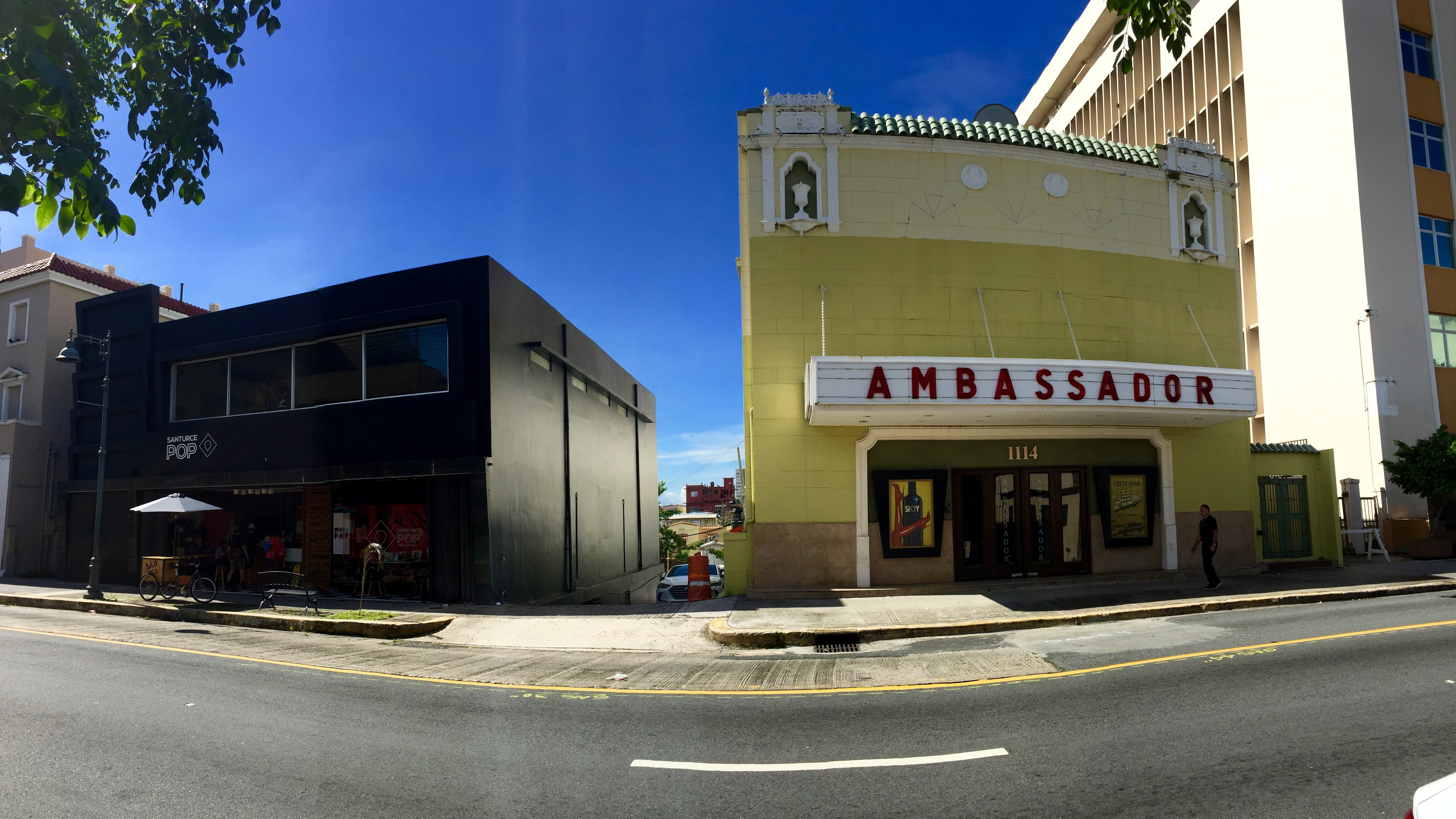
During its early years, the Ambassador Theatre was the place where kids went to see "Abbott and Costello" movies.

The district of Condado continued to rapidly grow after the construction of Dos Hermanos Bridge in 1910, connecting the district to San Juan Antiguo. This period of population growth brought prosperity to many of the neighborhoods of Santurce with high urbanization in Miramar, Ocean Park, Sagrado Corazón and the formal establishment of a local marketplace, for example, also in 1910. Tourism industry in Puerto Rico is formally born during this time with the establishment of Condado Vanderbilt Hotel in 1917, something that would quickly prompt the opening of numerous hotels, restaurants and other businesses in the area of Condado in order to cater to the increasing number of tourists and visitors from overseas.

Between 1937 and 1948, Santurce became one of the most vibrant areas of the capital. Numerous museums, art galleries, music venues also opened during this time. The district, notably Miramar and Sagrado Corazón, also experienced an architectural boom as vernacular Criollo style interacted with imported styles such as Art Deco, Prairie School and Spanish Revival. Some of these areas have been designated by the Puerto Rico State Historic Preservation Office as protected historic zones today.

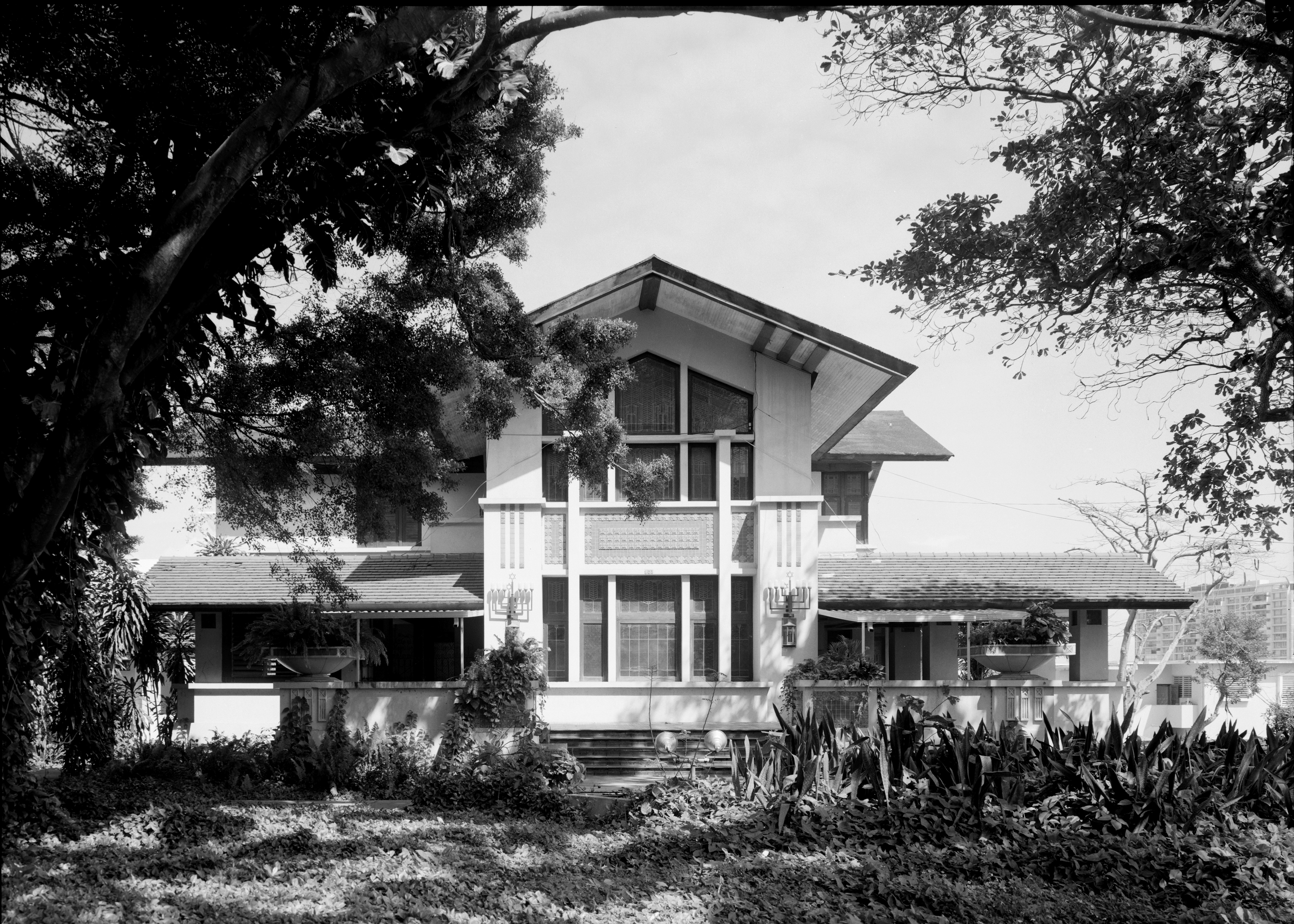
Korber House, which became Sha'are Zedeck synagogue in 1954

At its population peak in 1950, Santurce had a population of 195,007 inhabitants, making it more populated than every other municipality in the island at the time. This figure together with the annexation of Río Piedras a year after, brought the population of the municipality of San Juan to 451,658 by 1960, making it the second largest city in the Caribbean (after Havana) and the 29th largest city in the United States at the time. The population of the district became the most diversified at the time with large numbers of immigrant communities establishing businesses and institutions in the area. For example, the first synagogue in Puerto Rico, Sha'are Zedeck, was established here during this time in 1952 by William Korber, a wealthy Puerto Rican of German descent. Additionally, a large influx of Jewish Cubans also arrived immediately after the Cuban Revolution in 1959. With the establishment of a more robust island-wide roadway infrastructure, Santurce however began to experience a rapid population decline starting in the 1960s decade as large numbers of residents began to move outward from the city and into the newly emerging suburbs of Bayamón, Carolina, Guaynabo, and Levittown, for example. This period also saw a shift in business and commercialization away from Santurce, which before functioned as one of the main urban cores of the city, towards Hato Rey, and its newly developed central business district that is popularly known as the Golden Mile (la Milla de Oro). By the end of the 20th century, Santurce had a population of only 95,000 inhabitants and, with the exceptions of districts such as Condado, Miramar and Ocean Park, was experiencing extreme urban decay.

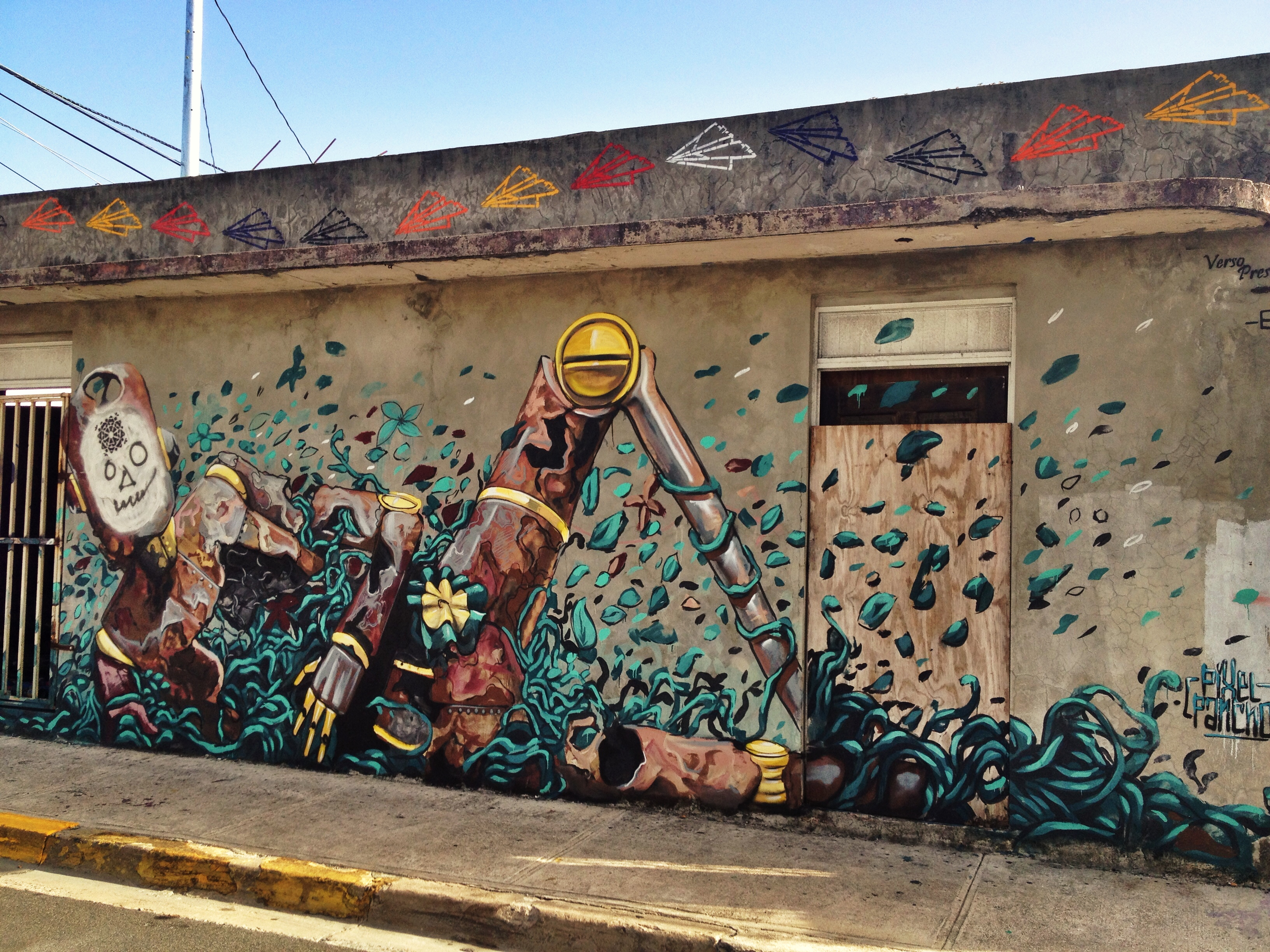
Cerra Street (2014)

=== 21st century ===
Despite notable developments such as the Puerto Rico Convention District and the Tren Urbano, early 21st century Santurce saw a continuation of a period of economic decline now coupled with the financial crisis of the local banking and mortgage system. The district however began a period of cosmopolitan revival and economic growth in 2009, as many new local establishments such as bars, clubs and restaurants opened their doors due to the resurging importance of trade and tourism prompted by a decrease in rent which attracted both artists and entrepreneurs to the area. Since then, Santurce began experiencing a new wave of gentrification and is now hailed by many as Puerto Rico's "hipster haven". In 2018, twenty-two murals were painted in and around Santurce to illustrate Santurce's culture and history, which inspired the annual Santurce es Ley arts festival, the largest mural and arts festival in the Caribbean and one of the largest of its kind in Latin America.

Santurce continues as a distinctive district with the highest concentration of arts organizations in the Caribbean with established museums such as Puerto Rico Museum of Art (MAPR), Puerto Rico Museum of Contemporary Art (MAC), Petrus Gallery as well as new museums such as Museo de los Santos y Arte Nacional (MUSAN) inaugurated in 2022 and programs such as Martes de Galerias established in 2026.

== Geography ==
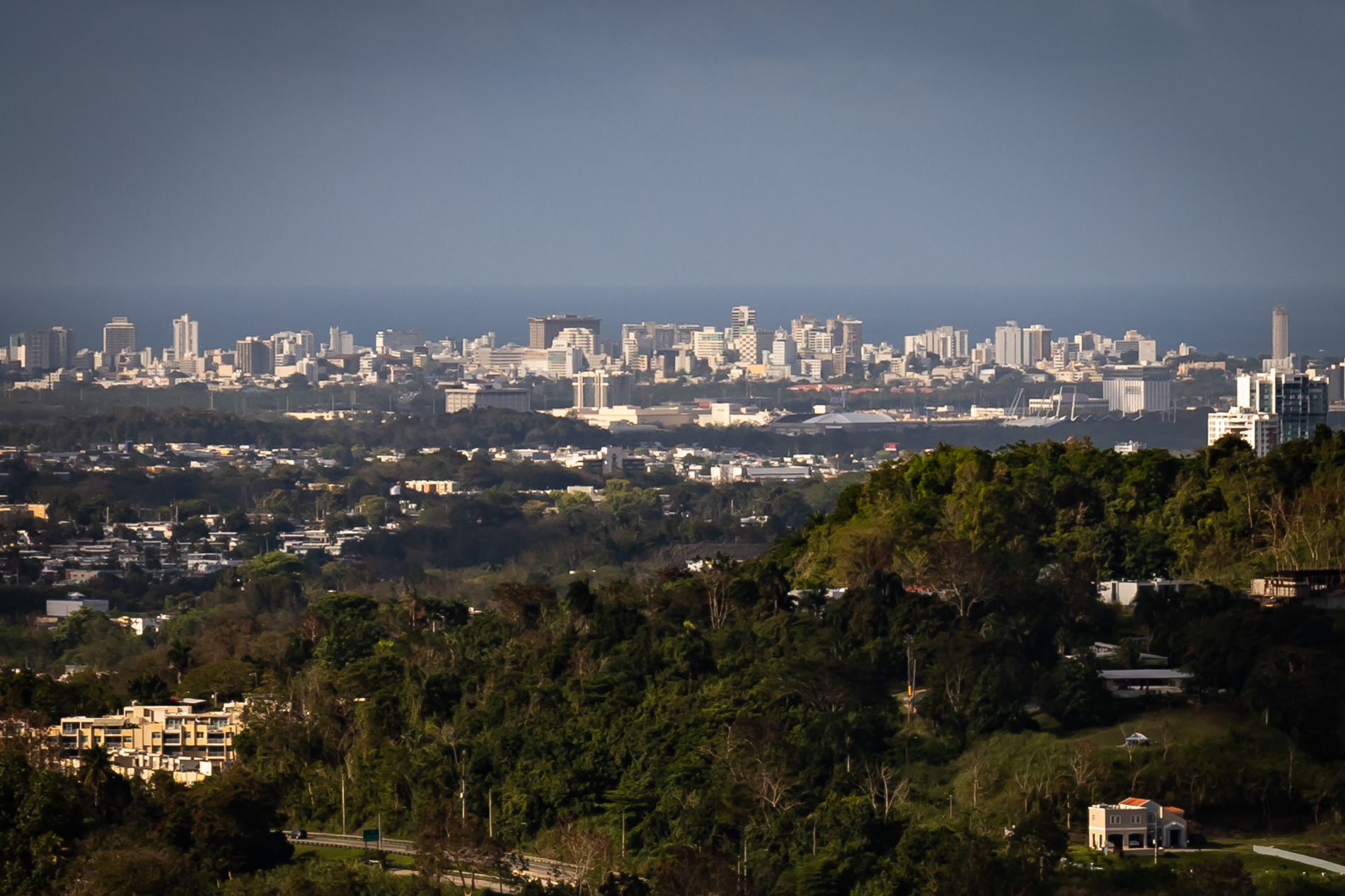
Santurce skyline from Mamey, Guaynabo.

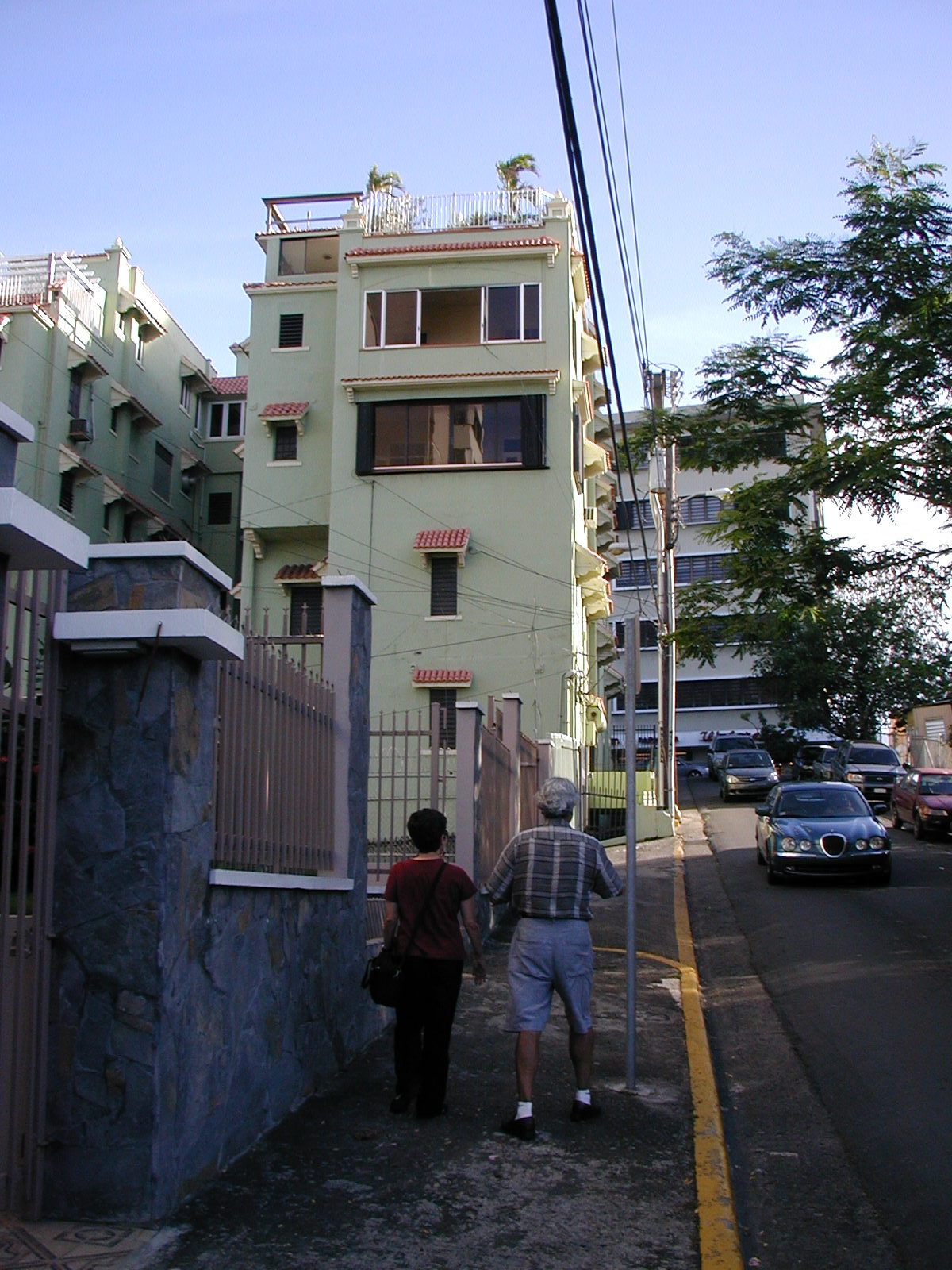
A couple walks on a street in Santurce

Santurce is located along the north-eastern coast of Puerto Rico. It lies south of the Atlantic Ocean, east of Old San Juan and west of Isla Verde. The district occupies an area of 5.24 square miles (13.6 km^{2}) of land and 3.46 (8.96 km2) of water. It is surrounded by six bodies of water: San Juan Bay, Condado Natural Lagoon, the Martín Peña Channel, San José Lagoon, Los Corozos Lagoon, and the Atlantic Ocean with its respective beaches and estuaries.

Geographically speaking, Santurce is a peninsula connected to the Puerto Rico mainland in the east, where it borders with the Isla Verde district of Carolina. It is 7.6 km long from west to east, and up to 3.0 km wide in the eastern part. The peninsula is bounded by the Atlantic Ocean in the north, with more than five km of beaches from the Condado peninsula in the west, to a point 600 m east of Punta Las Marías, where it borders on the Isla Verde area, and Laguna San José and its northern embayment, Laguna Los Corozos to the east. To the south is the Martín Peña Channel, which separates Santurce from the northern barrios of former municipio Río Piedras: Hato Rey Norte, Hato Rey Central, and Oriente. To the west is San Juan Bay, where three bridges, Dos Hermanos Bridge (Ave. Ashford), G. Esteves Bridge (Ave. Ponce de León) and San Antonio Bridge (Ave. Fernandes Juncos) connect Santurce with La Isleta (small island) where Old San Juan is located. It has a total area of 8.70 square miles (22.5 km^{2}) composed of 5.24 square miles (13.6 km^{2}) of land and 3.46 square miles (9.0 km^{2}) of water area.

The topography is mainly flat with low hills toward the central areas and swampy areas to the south along the Martín Peña Channel and to the east near the Laguna San José (San José Lagoon). The highest point is at Monteflores at 23 meters (75 feet) above sea level.

=== Cityscape ===
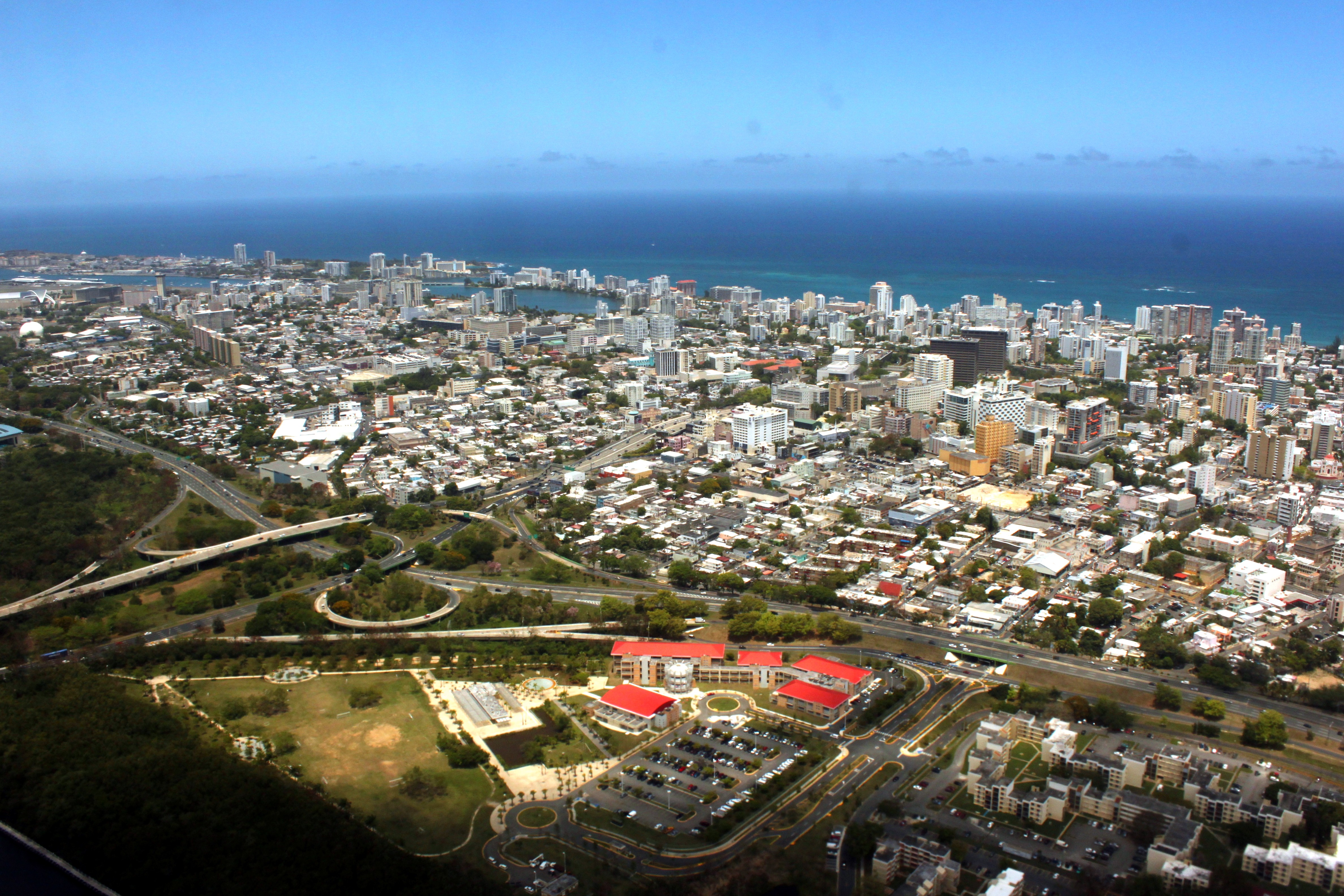
Aerial view of Santurce, clockwise: Atlantic Ocean, Parque/Ocean Park waterfront high-rises, San Mateo/Minillas/Bolívar high-rises, Luis Muñoz Marín Expressway, Sports and Recreation Department headquarters in Buenos Aires, Martín Peña Channel, PR-22, Miramar, Puerto Rico Convention Center in Isla Grande, San Antonio Channel, Puerta de Tierra, El Boquerón, Condado and Condado Lagoon.

==== Architecture ====
Structures of architectural value and historical importance are located mainly throughout Avenida Juan Ponce de León, Avenida Ashford and Avenida Fernández Juncos.

- Central High School, Spanish Renaissance-style building from 1925: Designed by Adrian Finlayson, Architect (Project I-5)
- Colegio de Arquitectos, 225 Parque Street: Designed by Carlos del Valle Zeno, Architect (link)
- Condado Vanderbilt Hotel, Spanish Revival style hotel from 1919
- Convention Center, Isla Grande Boulevard
- La Casabella, Spanish influence from 1898
- La Concha Resort, a renaissance hotel: Designed by Toro Ferrer, Architects (link)
- Residencia Aboy-Lompré, 1919 house designed by Miguel Ferrer

==== Public spaces ====
- La Placita de Santurce: The historical marketplace building, encompassing Campo Alegre, Alto del Cabro, and the Plaza del Mercado (a farmers' market full of local vendors with a social environment, bars, & restaurants), La Placita de Santurce is one of the most popular nightlife areas in San Juan.
- La Ventana al Mar (2004): Designed by Andrés Mignucci
- Plaza Antonia Quiñones (also known as Stella-Maris Square and Placita del Condado; 2000); designed by Andrés Mignucci

==== Beaches ====
- Condado Bridge Beach
- Ocean Park

==== Seaport ====
- Port of San Juan

== Demographics ==
Historical population
Census	Pop.	Note	%±
1900	5,840		—
1910	17,338		196.9%
1920	35,096		102.4%
1930	81,960		133.5%
1940	133,091		62.4%
1950	195,007		46.5%
1960	178,179		−8.6%
1970	128,232		−28.0%
1980	101,103		−21.2%
1990	95,184		−5.9%
2000	94,337		−0.9%
2010	81,251		−13.9%
2020	69,469		−14.5%
U.S. Decennial Census; 1899 (shown as 1900) 1910–1930; 1930–1950 1980–2000 2010

Santurce is one of the top ten most-populated areas of Puerto Rico. It includes the neighborhoods of Miramar, Loíza, Isla Grande, Barrio Obrero, and Condado, which are cultural hot spots for art, music, cuisine, fashion, hotels, technology, multimedia, film, textile and startups.

The 2010 U.S. census recorded a total population of 81,251 people living in an area of 5.24 square miles (13.6 km^{2}). It is the most populous borough (barrio) in Puerto Rico and one of the most densely populated areas of San Juan, at 15,447.0 residents per square mile (6,931.2/km^{2}).

Santurce is home to one of the largest Jewish communities in Puerto Rico and the Caribbean with over 1,500 people attending two local synagogues. Jews were officially prohibited from settling in the island through much of its history, but many managed to settle in the island as secret Jews.

Many arrived from France, the Netherlands, Saint-Barthélemy and Curaçao after World War II. A minor portion are descendants of Jewish Cubans who came to establishment after Fidel Castro's Cuban Revolution of 1959. Like in many former Spanish colonies founded soon after the Spanish Inquisition, there are some Puerto Ricans who are Crypto-Jews. Recent DNA ancestry has identified a number of Portuguese descendants who arrived in Puerto Rico after the start of the Portuguese Inquisition in 1536. These are descendants of Converso families. There are some who maintain elements of Jewish traditions, although they themselves are, or were raised as Christians.

Santurce also has a large Dominican community, along with Cuban, Colombian, Argentine and Chinese communities.

=== Subdivisions of Santurce ===
Santurce has a community of 81,251 of inhabitants living in a land area of 5.24 square miles (13.6 km^{2}). It is subdivided into 40 "subbarrios" (sub-districts).

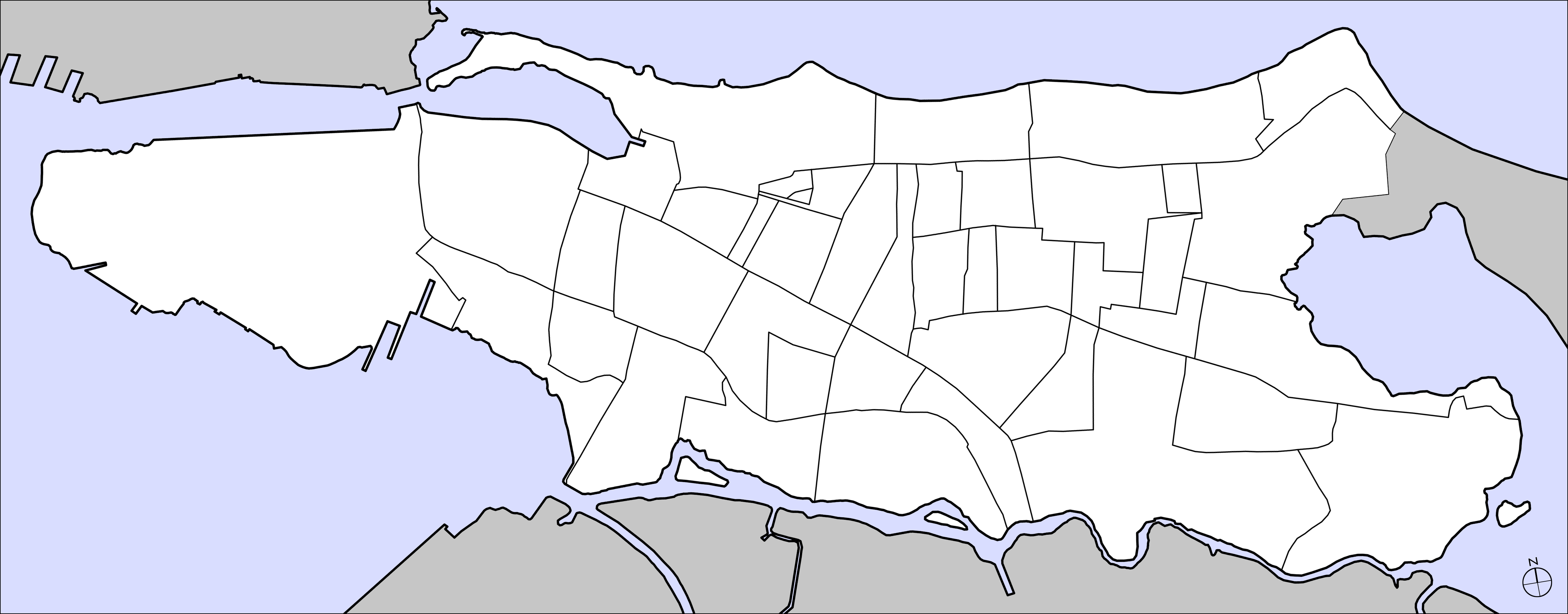

1. Alto del Cabro
2. Barrio Obrero
3. Bayola
4. Bolívar
5. Buenos Aires
6. Campo Alegre
7. Chícharo
8. Condadito
9. Condado
10. Figueroa
11. Gandul
12. Herrera
13. Hipódromo
14. Hoare
15. Isla Grande
16. La Zona
17. Las Casas
18. Las Marías
19. Las Palmas
20. Loíza
21. Machuchal
22. Marruecos
23. Martín Peña
24. María Moczó
25. Melilla
26. Merhoff
27. Minillas
28. Miramar
29. Monteflores
30. Ocean Park
31. Parque
32. Pozo del Hato
33. Pulguero
34. Sagrado Corazón
35. San Juan Moderno
36. San Mateo
37. Seboruco
38. Shanghai
39. Tras Talleres
40. Villa Palmeras

=== Population ===
For centuries "barrios" were the primary administrative division of Puerto Rico's municipalities, however, presently they primarily serve statistical purposes for both the U.S. Census Bureau & the Puerto Rico Planning Board. The most densely populated area lies to the southeast bordering the San José Lagoon and the Martín Peña Channel, while the least densely populated areas are found by the mangrove swamps to the south surrounding the Martín Peña Channel, and the western area of Isla Grande, a decommissioned United States Navy military base.

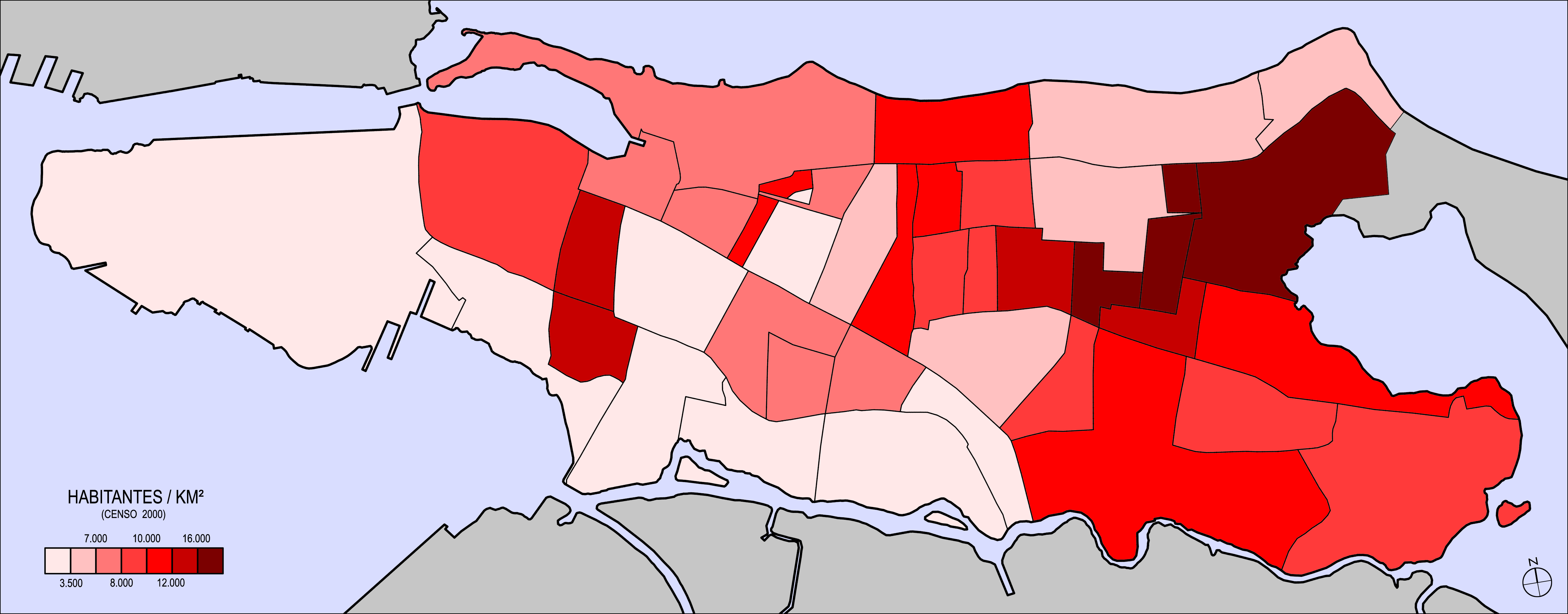
Population density per sub-district of Santurce according to Census 2000.

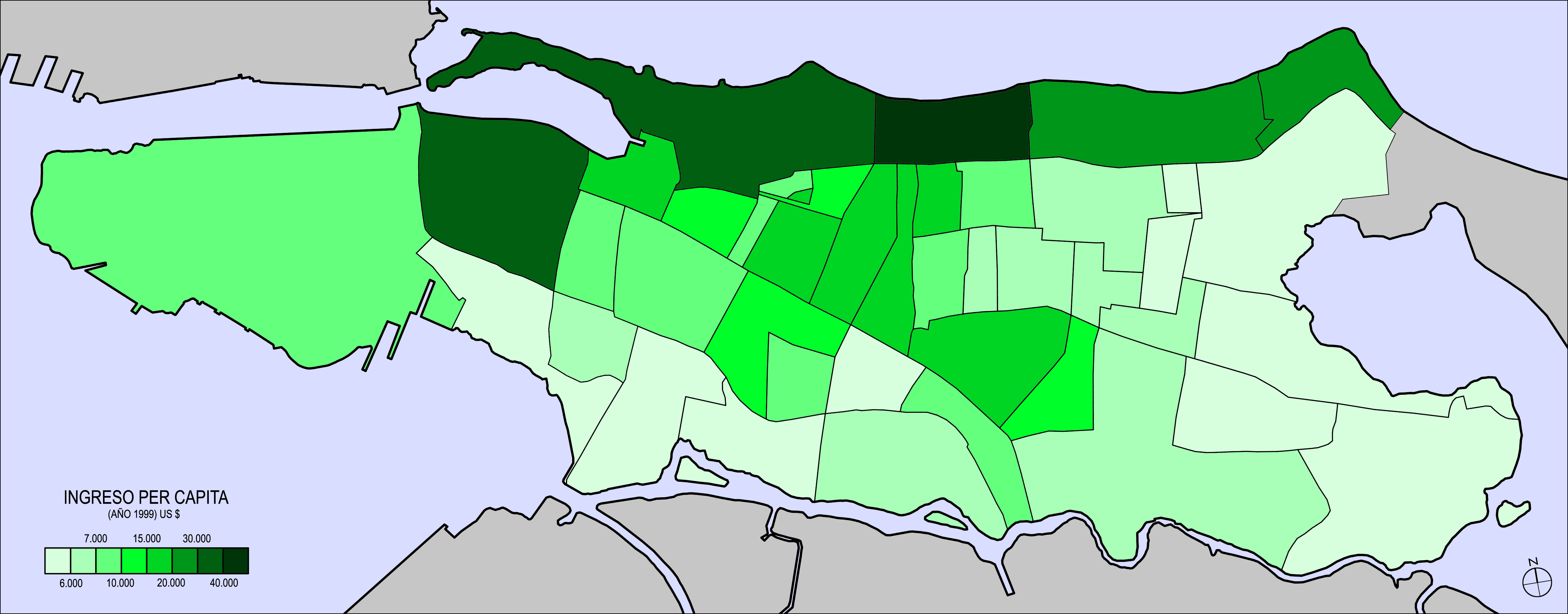
Per capita income by sub-district of Santurce according to Census 2000.

Nr.	Sub-barrio	Land Area (m^{2})	Population (Census 2000)	Density km^{−2}
1	Alto del Cabro	156717	1164	7427.4
2	Barrio Obrero	1034200	11467	11087.8
3	Bayola	71645	564	7872.1
4	Bolívar	163417	1223	7483.9
5	Buenos Aires	446986	1303	2915.1
6	Campo Alegre	123061	942	7654.7
7	Chícharo	75355	722	9581.3
8	Condadito	62470	748	11973.7
9	Condado	824791	6170	7480.7
10	Figueroa	350927	1016	2895.2
11	Gandul	167753	2035	12130.9
12	Herrera	123369	1841	14922.7
13	Hipódromo	268195	2017	7520.6
14	Hoare	363490	3	8.3
15	Isla Grande^{1)}	2039968	753	369.1
16	La Zona	379687	1280	3371.2
17	Las Casas^{2)}	803500	6775	8431.9
18	Las Marías	242223	1172	4838.5
19	Las Palmas	316171	2772	8767.4
20	Loíza	323012	2139	6622
21	Machuchal	140008	1212	8656.6
22	María Moczó	106196	1964	18494.1
23	Marruecos	267165	0	0
24	Martín Peña	185692	415	2234.9
25	Melilla	129544	926	7148.2
26	Merhoff	300801	2992	9946.8
27	Minillas	215963	1484	6871.5
28	Miramar	632154	5440	8605.5
29	Monteflores	172397	1657	9611.5
30	Ocean Park^{4)}	520891	1976	3793.5
31	Parque	299804	3251	10843.8
32	Pozo del Hato	176987	137	774.1
33	Pulguero	131613	1196	9087.2
34	Sagrado Corazón	345472	1646	4764.5
35	San Juan Moderno	91500	1083	11836.1
36	San Mateo	168864	1989	11778.7
37	Seboruco	167887	2198	13092.1
38	Shanghai	686961	11331	16494.4
39	Tras Talleres	168076	2453	14594.6
40	Villa Palmeras	163389	2648	16206.7
	Santurce	13568557	81251	6932.7
^{1)}recently named Puerto Rico Convention Center
^{2)}including "Isla Guachinanga" in the "Laguna San José"
^{3)}should be attributed to Merhoff Sub-Barrio (22)
^{4)}including "Isla Piedra" one km off the Atlantic coast

== Transportation ==
Public transportation is provided by several bus lines (locally known as guaguas) operated by the Puerto Rico Metropolitan Bus Authority and circulate along the main avenues of Ponce de León and Fernández Juncos among others.

In the peripheries of Santurce there is a rapid transit system called Tren Urbano. The Sagrado Corazón station is the terminus of the sole metro system line of San Juan, located in the southeast section of the district in the neighborhood of Martín Peña.

Santurce is a few minutes away by car from the US territory's main airport, Luis Muñoz Marín International Airport, and from San Juan's secondary commercial airport, Isla Grande Airport.

== Culture ==
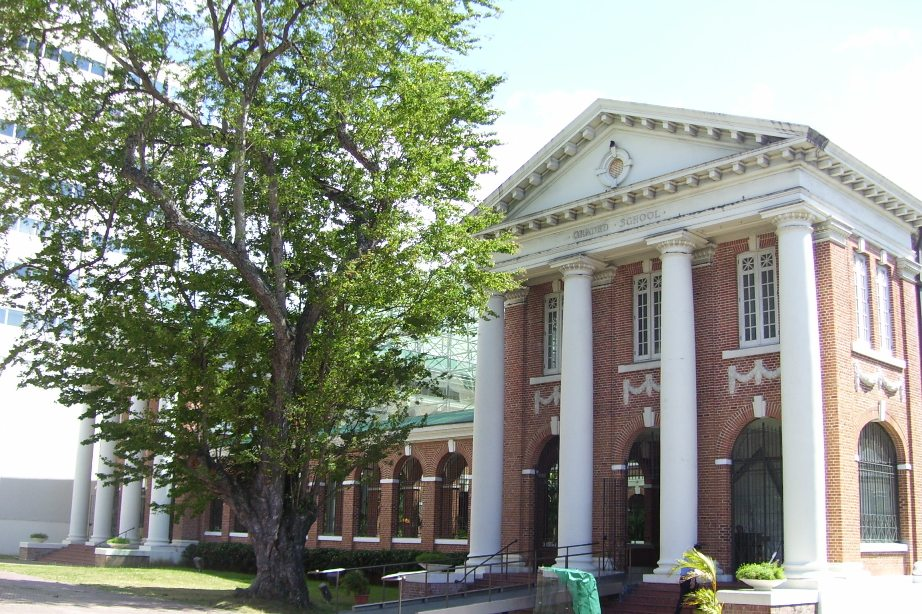
Puerto Rico Museum of Contemporary Art

=== Museums and galleries ===
Santurce is the main residence of two major museums on the island.

- the Museum of Art of Puerto Rico
- the Puerto Rico Museum of Contemporary Art
- the Galería Casa Jefferson

=== Performing arts ===
- Ballets de San Juan
- Luis A. Ferré Performing Arts Center, modern award-winning fine arts architectural masterpiece
- In 2000 the Music Hall Theater in Santurce was renamed Teatro Victoria Espinosa after director Victoria Espinosa.

== Education ==
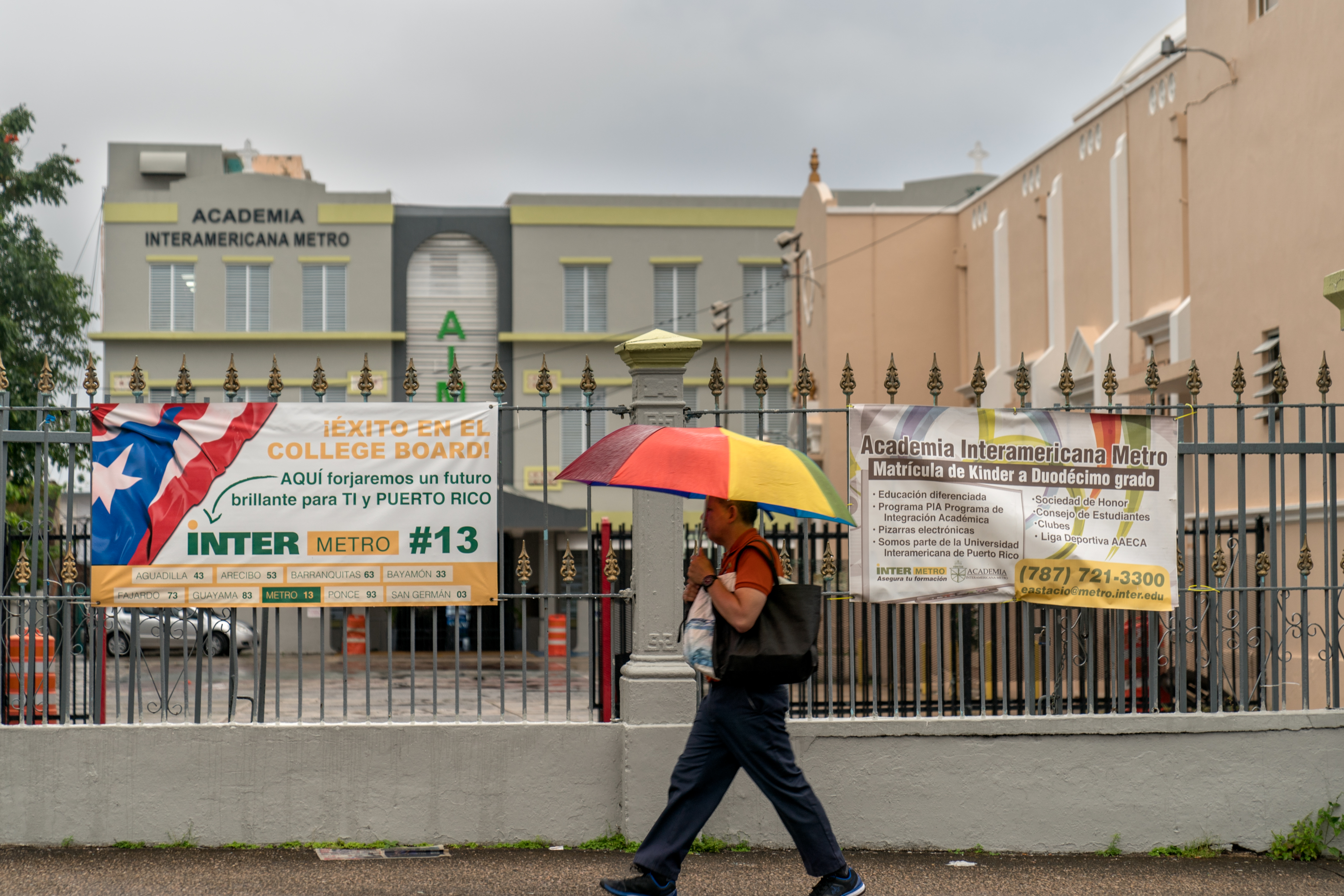
Academia Interamericana Metro

Santurce is home to several private educational institutions, including:

- Conservatory of Music of Puerto Rico
- University of the Sacred Heart
- Academia San Jorge
- Academia Interamericana Metro
- Perpetuo Socorro
- Robinson School
- Saint John's School

It also includes notable public schools:

- Padre Rufo School, bilingual public school
- Central High School, built in 1925 and listed on the U.S. National Register of Historic Places

== Synagogues and cathedrals ==
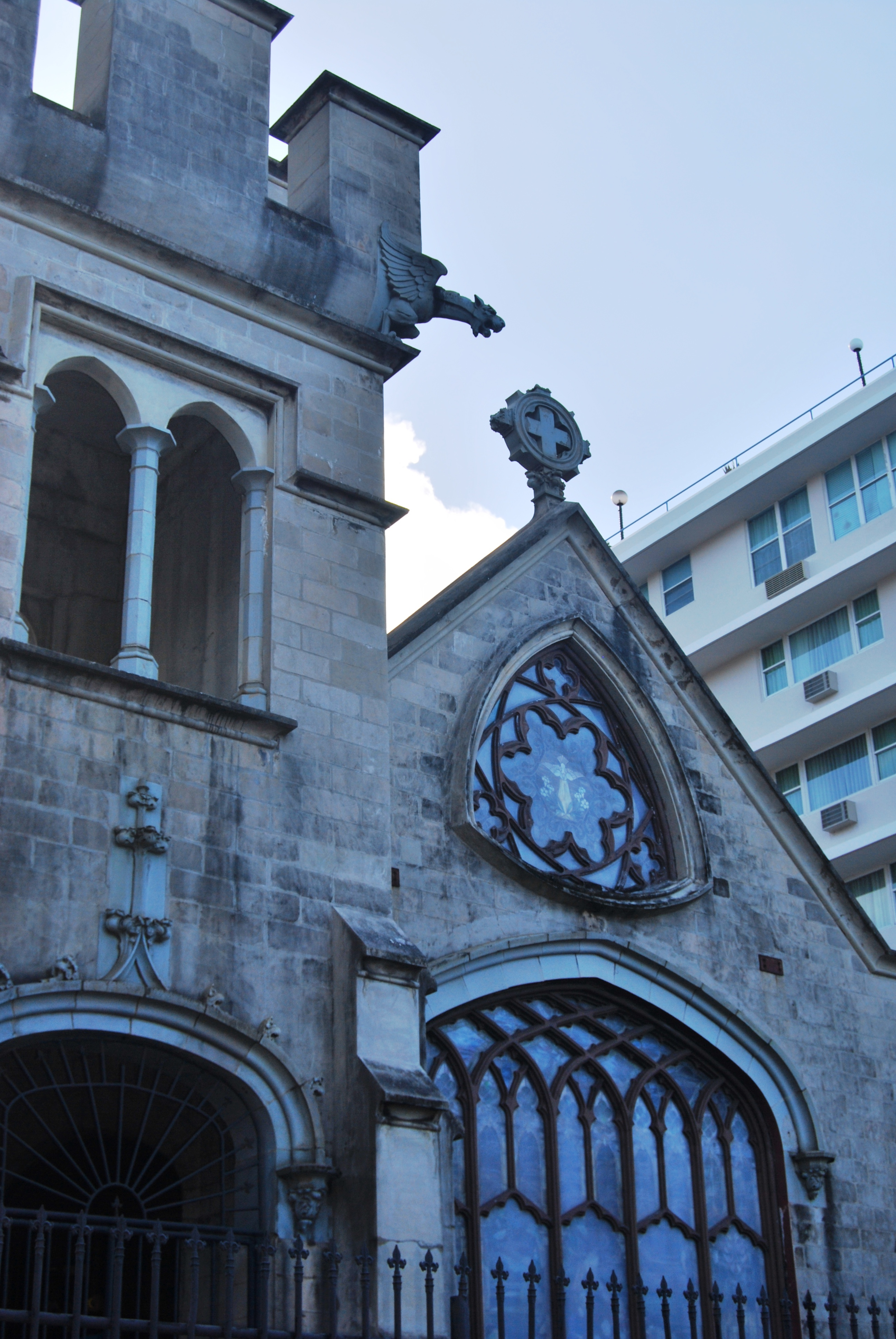
Nuestra Señora de Lourdes Chapel

- Episcopal Cathedral of St. John the Baptist (Catedral San Juan Bautista)
- Nuestra Señora de Lourdes Chapel, Neo-Gothic style chapel from 1909 designed by Antonin Nechodoma
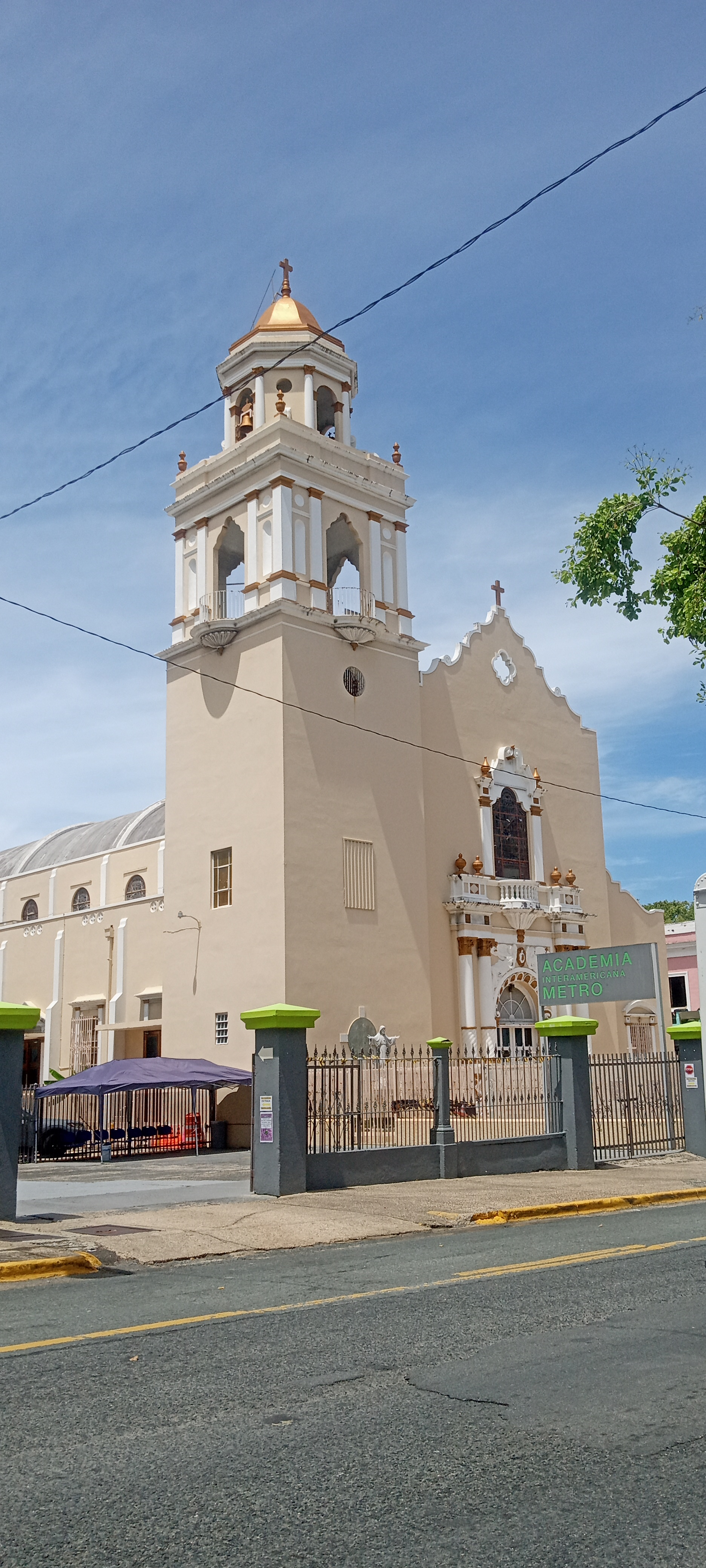
- Iglesia Sagrado Corazón in Santurce
  Sagrado Corazon Church (Parada 19)
- Synagogue Shaare Tzadik
- Stella-Maris Catholic Church
- Temple Beth Shalom
- Parroquia San Vicente de Paúl (Parada 24)

== Sports ==
Santurce has the most modern swimming facilities in the Caribbean and fourth in the world. It is an Olympic aquatic sports facility used to host local and international events such as the 2nd A.S.U.A Pan American Masters Swimming Championship. The San Juan Natatorium is located in Santurce's Central Park.

Santurce is represented in professional baseball and basketball by teams using the name Cangrejeros de Santurce. The baseball club was granted a franchise in 1939 and became part of Puerto Rico's professional winter league. Its 1954-55 team included Roberto Clemente and Willie Mays and won both the Puerto Rican league championship and the Caribbean Series. The basketball team competes in the Baloncesto Superior Nacional (BSN); Canrejeros teams have won eight BSN championships.

== Health ==
Santurce has an extensive healthcare network which includes two of the finest hospitals on the island, Ashford Presbyterian Community Hospital and Pavia Hospital.

== Economy ==
Santurce experienced significant economic growth following World War II. During this period the district underwent an economic revitalization. Tourism is also a key industry based on Santurce's proximity to Puerto Rico's main international airport, Luis Muñoz Marín International Airport, and the smaller Fernando Luis Ribas Dominicci Airport. The concentration of hotels are primarily located in the Condado area where there are numerous luxurious hotels including La Concha Resort, Marriott and the Conrad Hotel.

== Notable natives and residents ==
- Miguel Algarín, writer and poet
- Miguel Arteta, film and television director
- Pura Belpré, author
- Giannina Braschi, author
- Tego Calderón, reggaeton singer
- Wilmer Calderon, Puerto Rican-American actor
- Deborah Carthy-Deu, Miss Puerto Rico 1985, Miss Universe 1985; actress, television host
- Lourdes Chacón, actress
- Jessica Cristina, singer
- Carly Colón, professional wrestler and performer
- Christian Daniel, singer-songwriter and actor
- Jack Delano, author and photographer
- Benicio del Toro, actor and producer
- Edgar Diaz, professional baseball player
- José Ferrer, actor, director and producer
- Francisco Figueroa, professional boxer
- Eddie Gómez, bassist
- Wilfredo Gómez, professional boxer
- Sonia Gutierrez, educator, Hispanic rights activist.
- Nathan Leopold, American murderer
- Luis López Nieves, writer
- Gilberto Monroig, singer
- Andy Montañez, salsa singer for El Gran Combo
- Antonin Nechodoma, architect
- Ossie Ocasio, professional boxer
- Cynthia Olavarria, Miss Universe Puerto Rico 2005 and first runner-up Miss Universe 2005
- Carlos Ponce, actor, singer and composer
- Jorge Posada, baseball player (New York Yankees)
- Ismael Rivera, salsa singer & performer
- Ed Romero, baseball player
- Gilberto Santa Rosa, band leader, salsa and bolero singer
- Luis Rafael Sánchez, writer
- Daniel Santos, singer and composer
- Arturo Schomburg, writer & historian
- Gloria Swanson, American actress
- Olga Tañón, singer

== See also ==
- List of communities in Puerto Rico
