= San Mateo (Santurce) =

Subbarrio of Santurce in San Juan, Puerto Rico

- Subbarrio
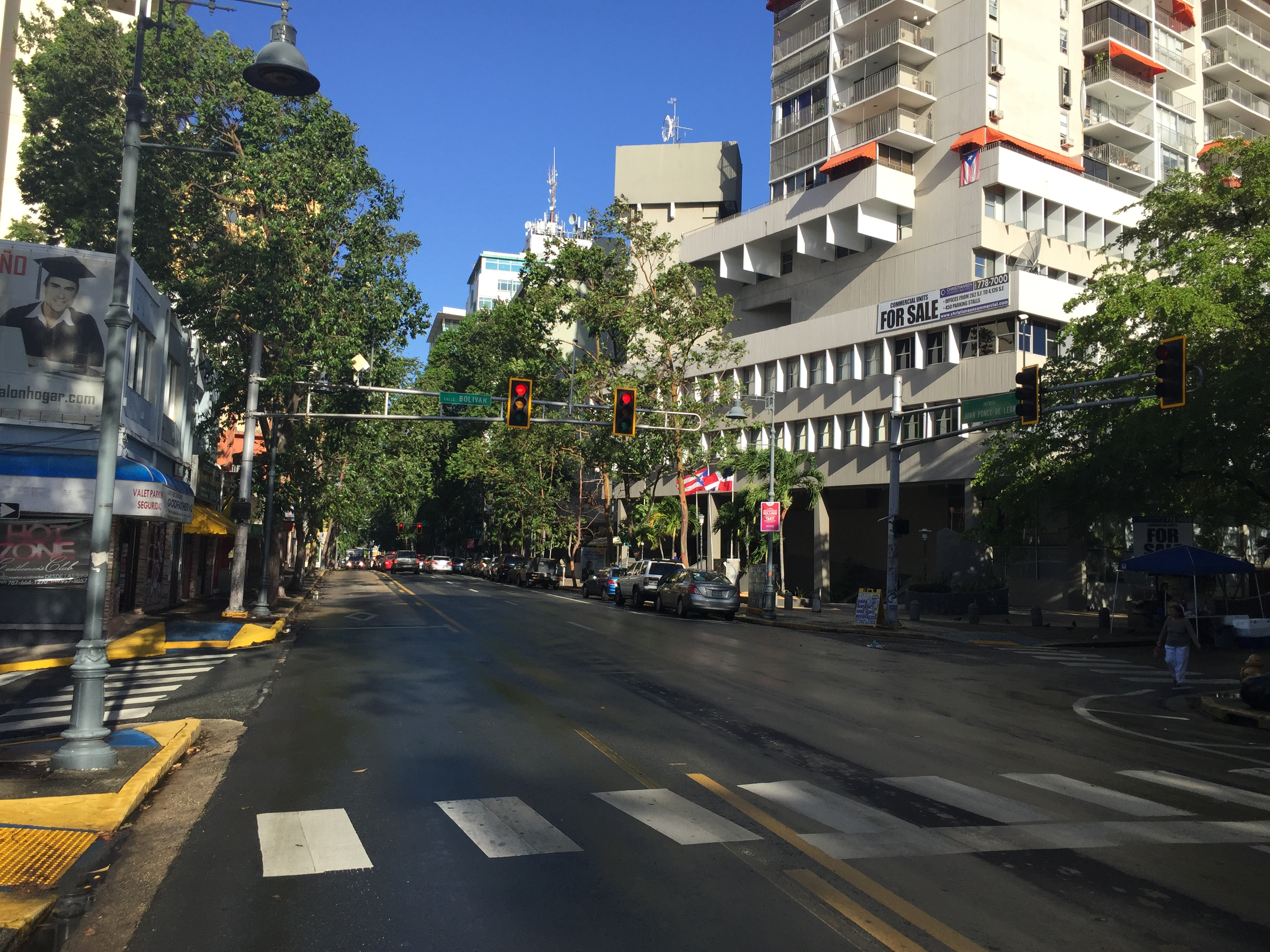
- Avenida Juan Ponce de León in San Mateo in Santurce

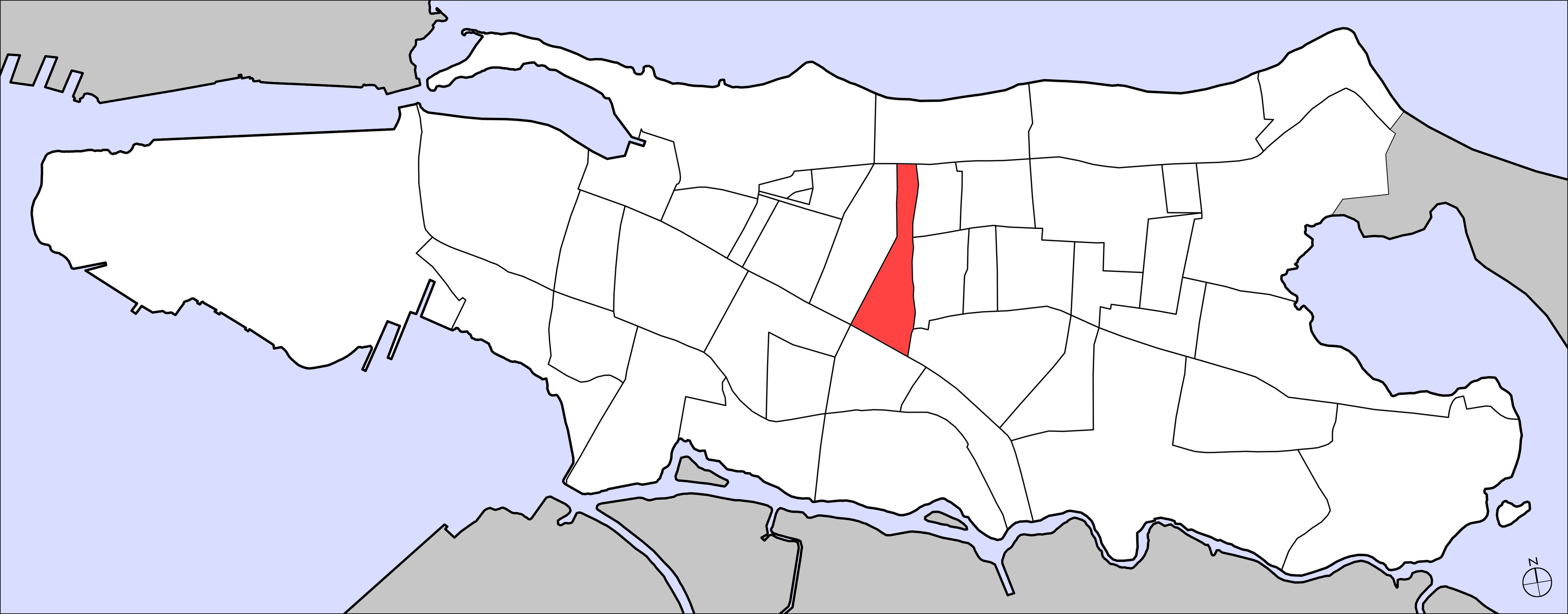
- Map showing the location of San Mateo within the barrio of Santurce
- Coordinates: 18°26′45″N 66°3′51″W
- Commonwealth: Puerto Rico
- Municipality: San Juan
- Barrio: Santurce

Area
  - Total: .07 sq mi (0.18 km^{2})
  - Land: .07 sq mi (0.18 km^{2})
- Elevation: 66 ft (20 m)

Population (2010)
  - Total: 1,549
  - Density: 22,128.6/sq mi (8,543.9/km^{2})
- Source: 2010 Census
- Time zone: UTC−4 (AST)

San Mateo is one of the forty subbarrios of Santurce, San Juan, Puerto Rico.

== History ==
San Mateo de Cangrejos, as it was originally known, was founded in the 17th century by cimarrones who were fleeing enslavement from neighboring St. Eustatius, Saint Croix, and Saint Thomas, U.S. Virgin Islands, thus the original settlers of San Mateo were self-emancipated when laws passed in 1664, 1680, and 1693 legalized their freedom.

Historian and writer Arturo Alfonso Schomburg was from San Mateo de Cangrejos. Roberto Clemente and Willie Mays played for the Santurce Cangrejos baseball team before playing in Major League Baseball.

== Demographics ==
In 1940, San Mateo had a population of 4,175.

In 2000, San Mateo had a population of 1,989.

In 2010, San Mateo had a population of 1,549 and a population density of 22,128.6 persons per square mile.

== Places ==
The historic Church of San Mateo de Cangrejos of Santurce is in San Mateo, at Calle San Jorge and Calle San Mateo (one block from Avenida Juan Ponce de León).

== Gallery ==
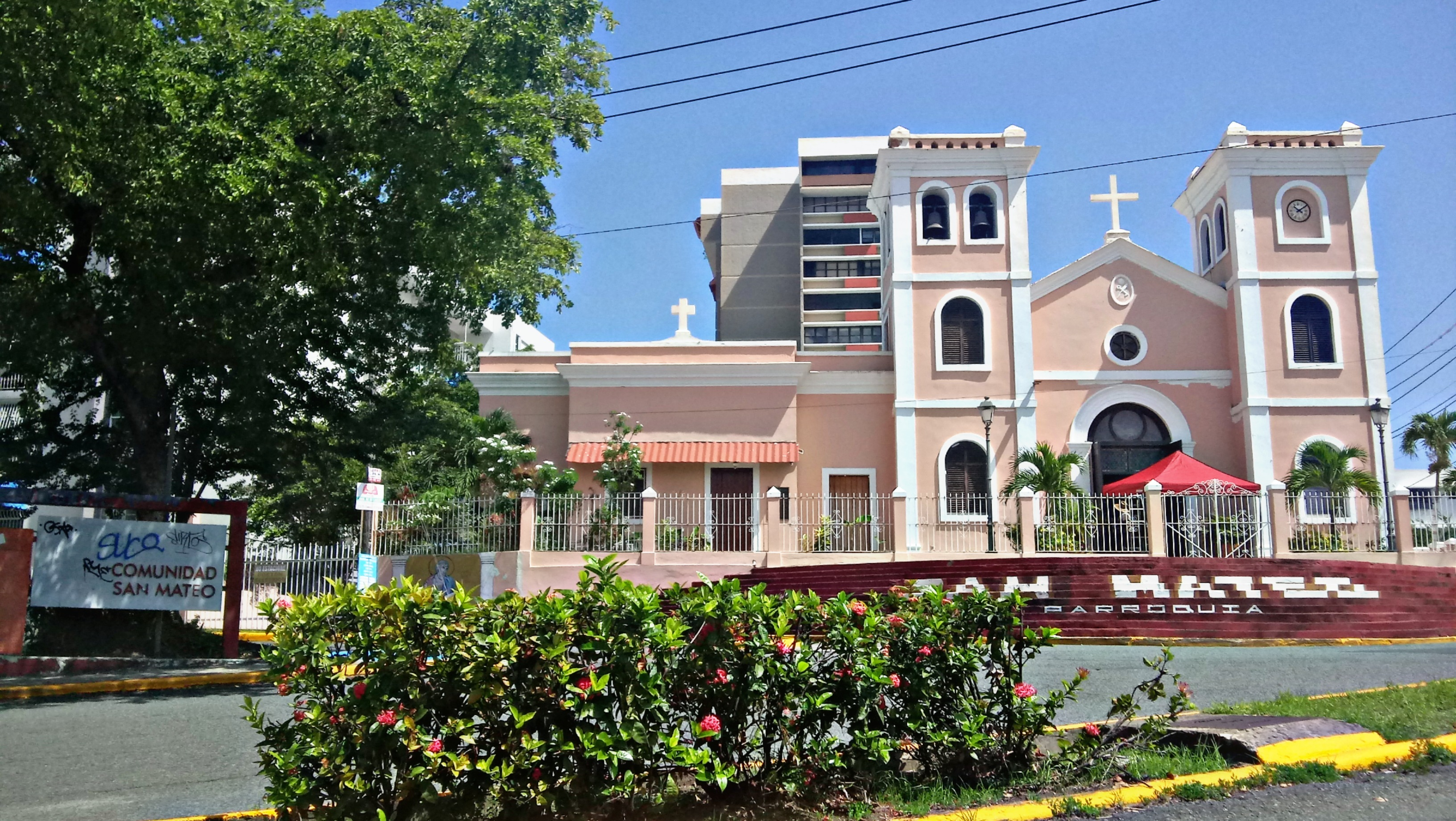
The church in 2020

== See also ==
- List of communities in Puerto Rico
