= Pulguero (Santurce) =

Subbarrio of Santurce in San Juan, Puerto Rico

Coordinates: 18°26′46″N 66°03′42″W

- Subbarrio
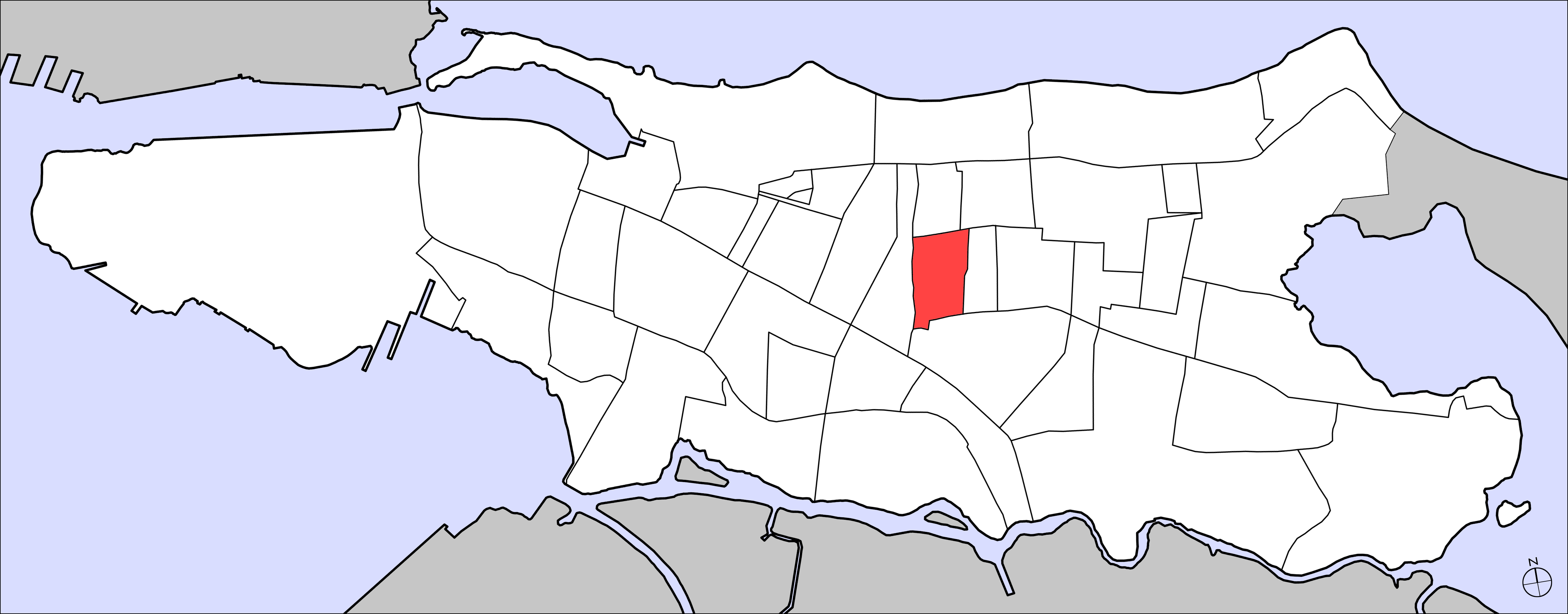
- Commonwealth: Puerto Rico
- Municipality: San Juan
- Barrio: Santurce

Area
  - Total: .05 sq mi (0.13 km^{2})
  - Land: .05 sq mi (0.13 km^{2})
- Elevation: 52 ft (16 m)

Population (2010)
  - Total: 1,035
  - Density: 20,700/sq mi (8,000/km^{2})
- Source: 2010 Census
- Time zone: UTC−4 (AST)

Pulguero is one of the forty subbarrios of Santurce, San Juan, Puerto Rico.

== Demographics ==
In 1940, Pulguero had a population of 3,238.

In 2000, Pulguero had a population of 1,196.

In 2010, Pulguero had a population of 1,035 persons and a population density of 20,700 persons per square mile.

== See also ==
- List of communities in Puerto Rico
