= Shanghai (Santurce) =

Subbarrio of Santurce in San Juan, Puerto Rico

- Subbarrio
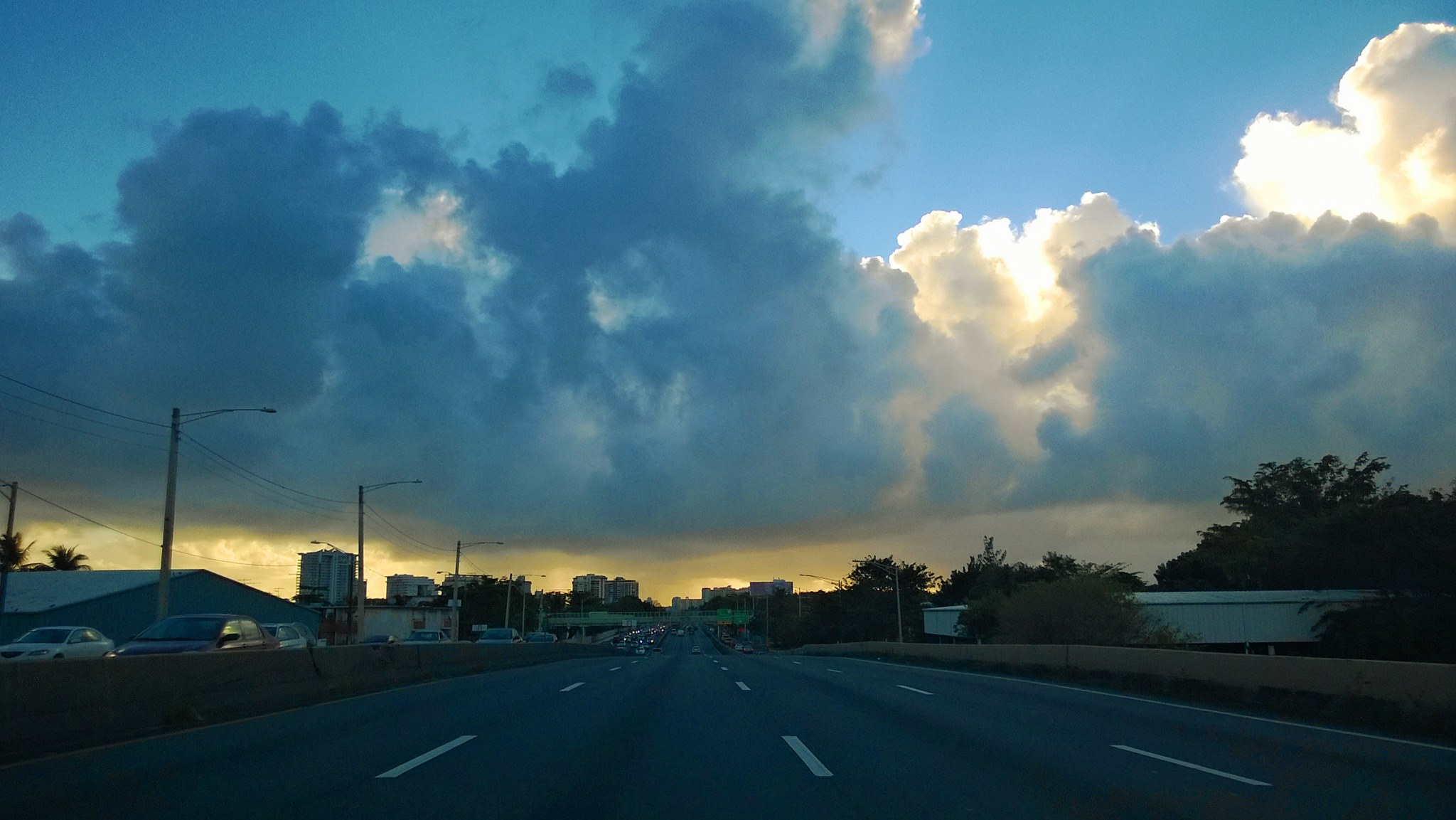
- Puerto Rico Highway 26 in Shanghai

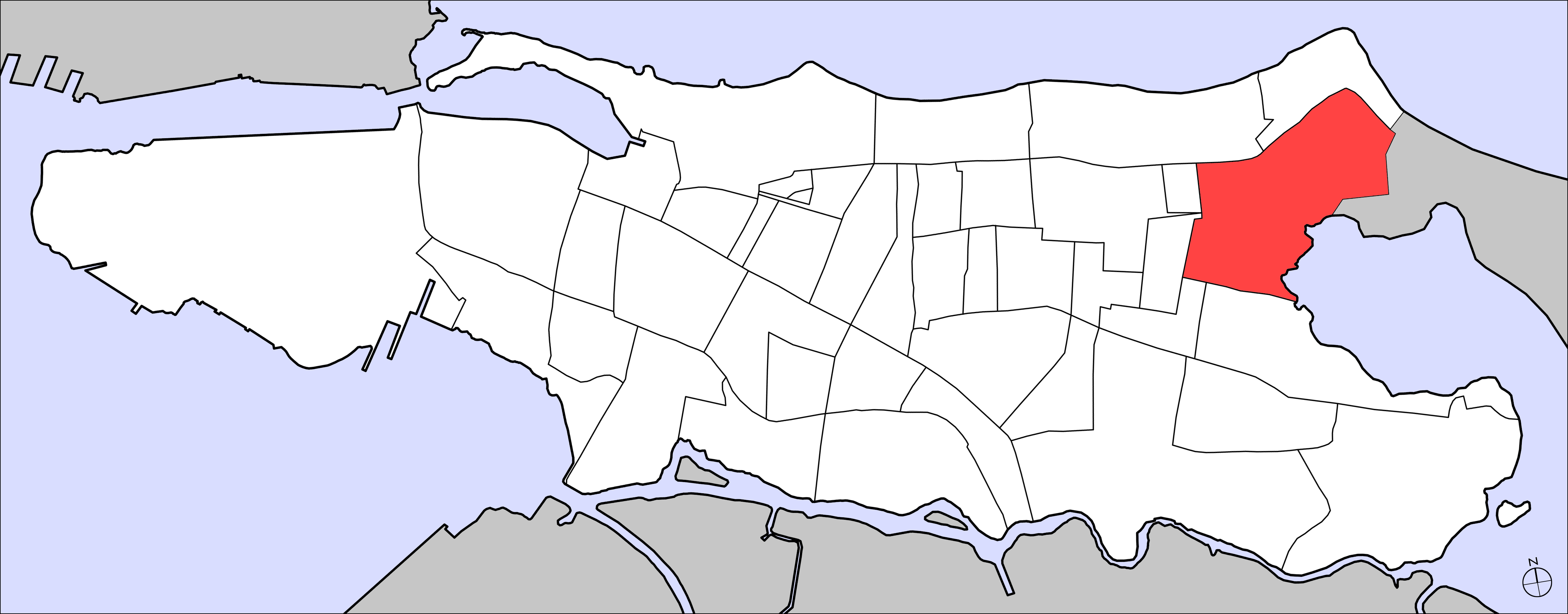
- Coordinates: 18°26′50″N 66°2′37″W
- Commonwealth: Puerto Rico
- Municipality: San Juan
- Barrio: Santurce

Area
  - Total: 0.73 km^{2} (0.28 sq mi)
  - Land: 0.70 km^{2} (0.27 sq mi)
  - Water: 0.026 km^{2} (0.01 sq mi)

Population
  - Total: 9,438
  - Density: 13,496.4/km^{2} (34,955.6/sq mi)
- Source: 2010 United States census

Shanghai is one of the 40 subbarrios of Santurce, a barrio of San Juan, Puerto Rico.

== Demographics ==
In 1940, Shanghai had a population of 3,650.

In 2000, Shanghai had a population of 11,331.

In 2010, Shanghai had a population of 9,438 and a population density of 34,955.6 persons per square mile.

== Location ==
Shanghai is a crossover sector in Santurce located north and south of Baldorioty Expressway between Loiza Street (PR-37) and Gilberto Monroig Street. It is surrounded by Isla Verde, Las Marías, Laguna Los Corozos, Merhoff, Villa Palmeras and Ocean Park Beach.

== See also ==
- List of communities in Puerto Rico
