= Parque (Santurce) =

Subbarrio of Santurce in San Juan, Puerto Rico

- Subbarrio
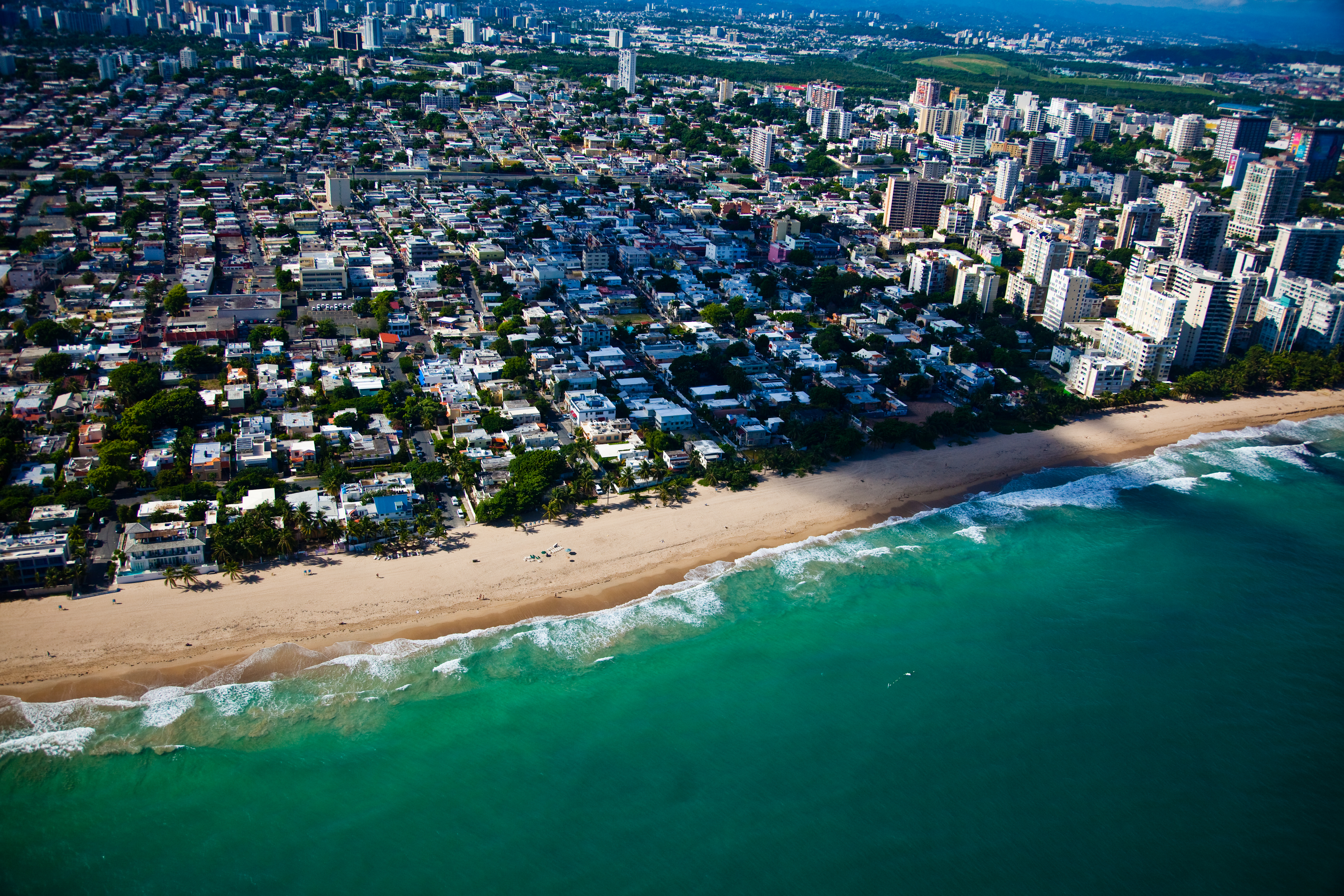
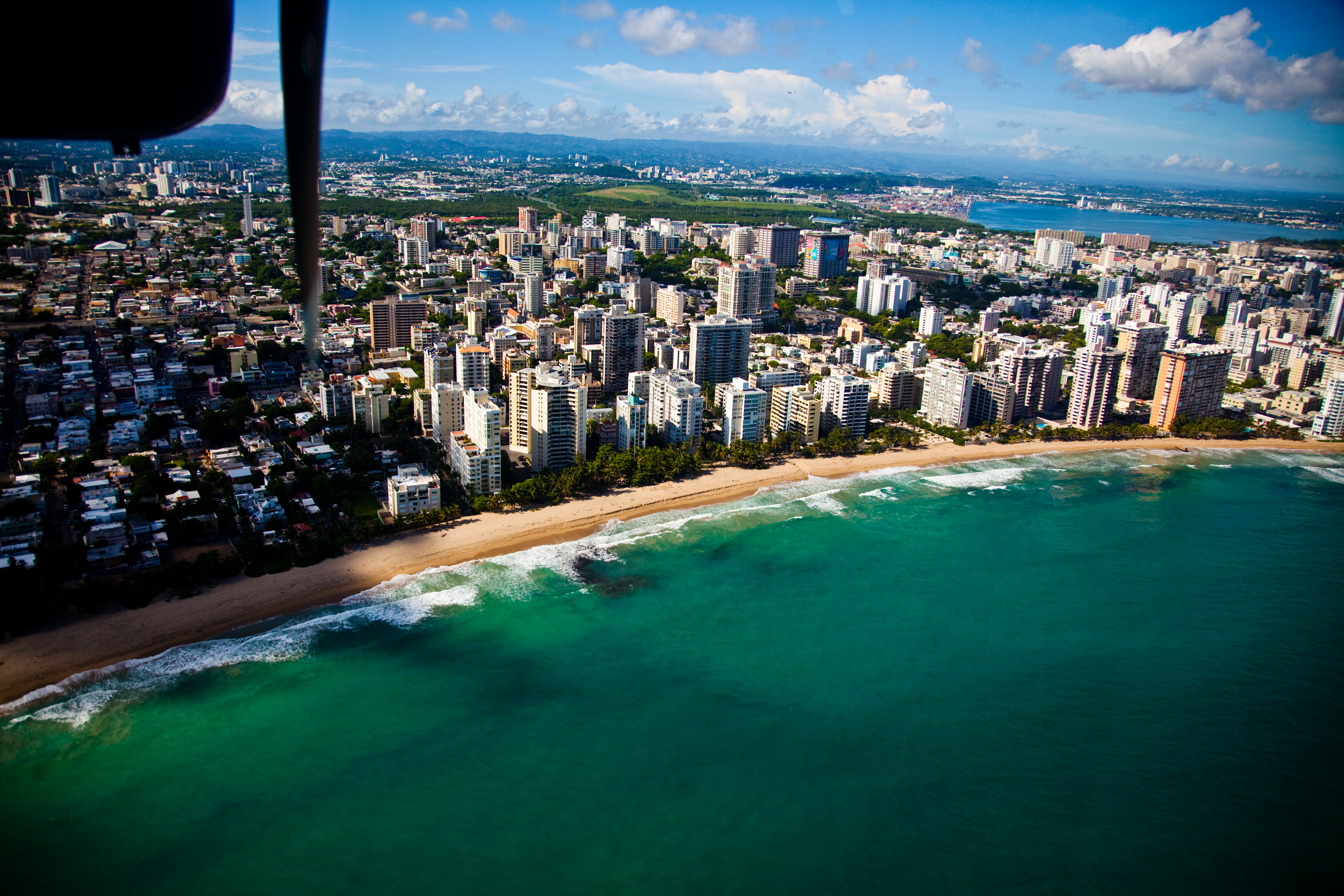
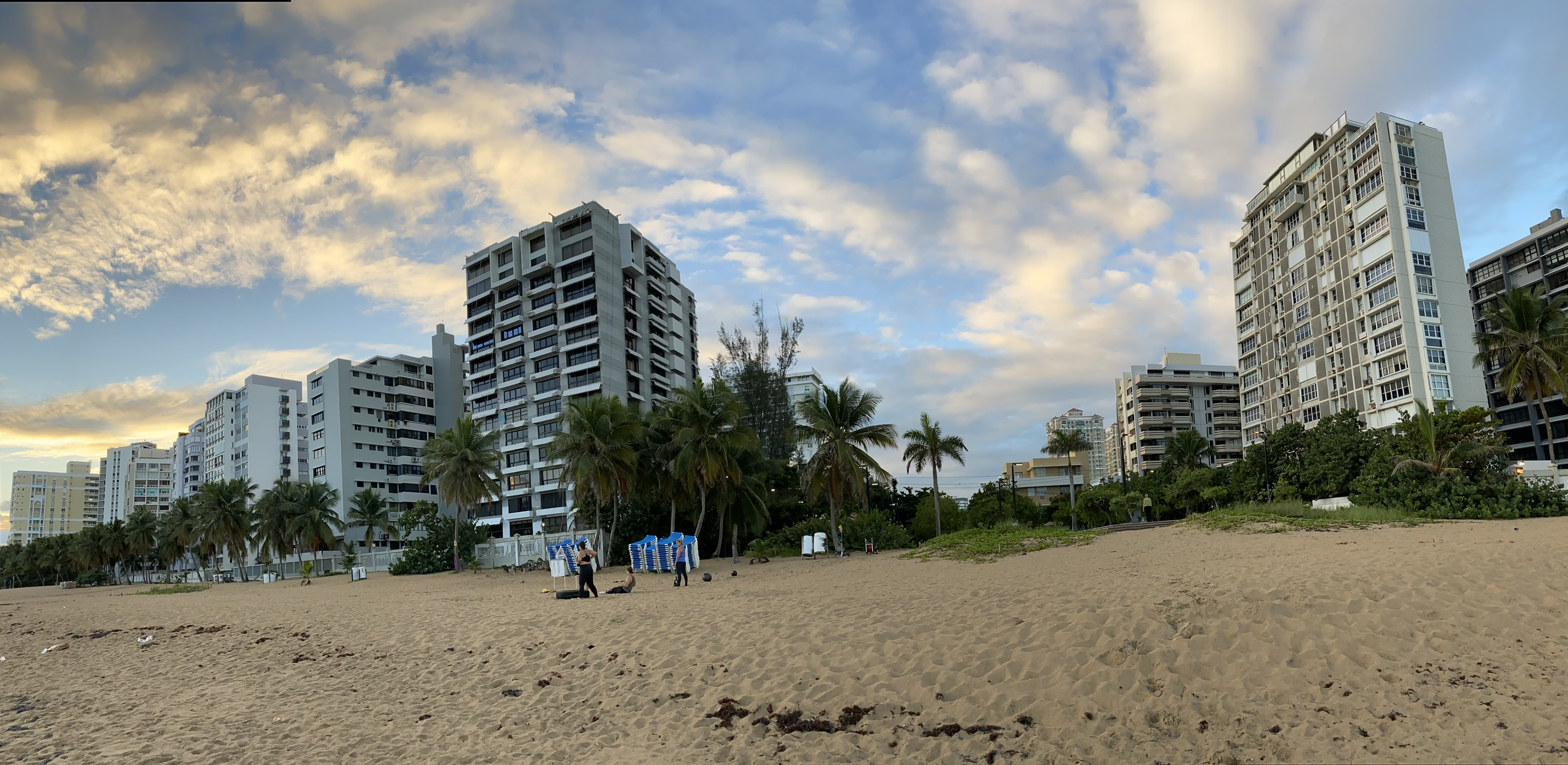
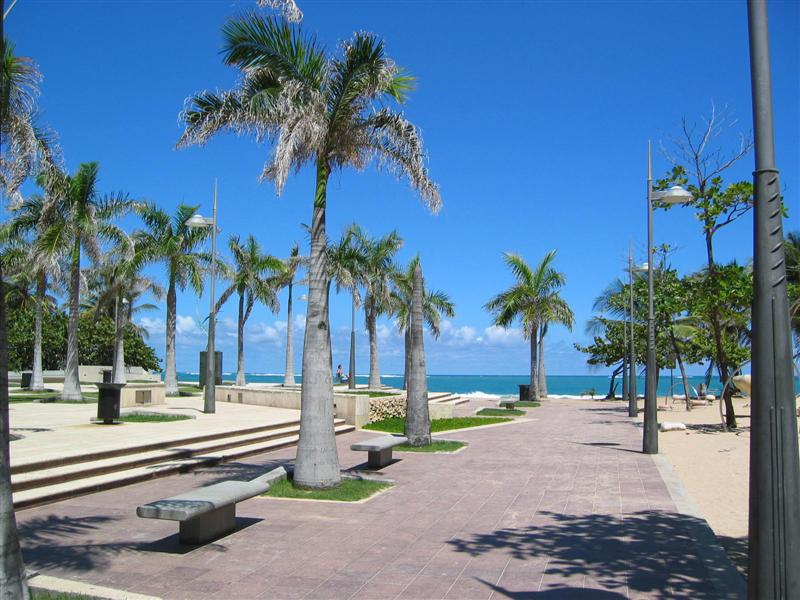
- Western Ocean Park and eastern Parque districts (foreground) Western Parque and eastern Condado districts (foreground) Condos and Indian Park Indian Park

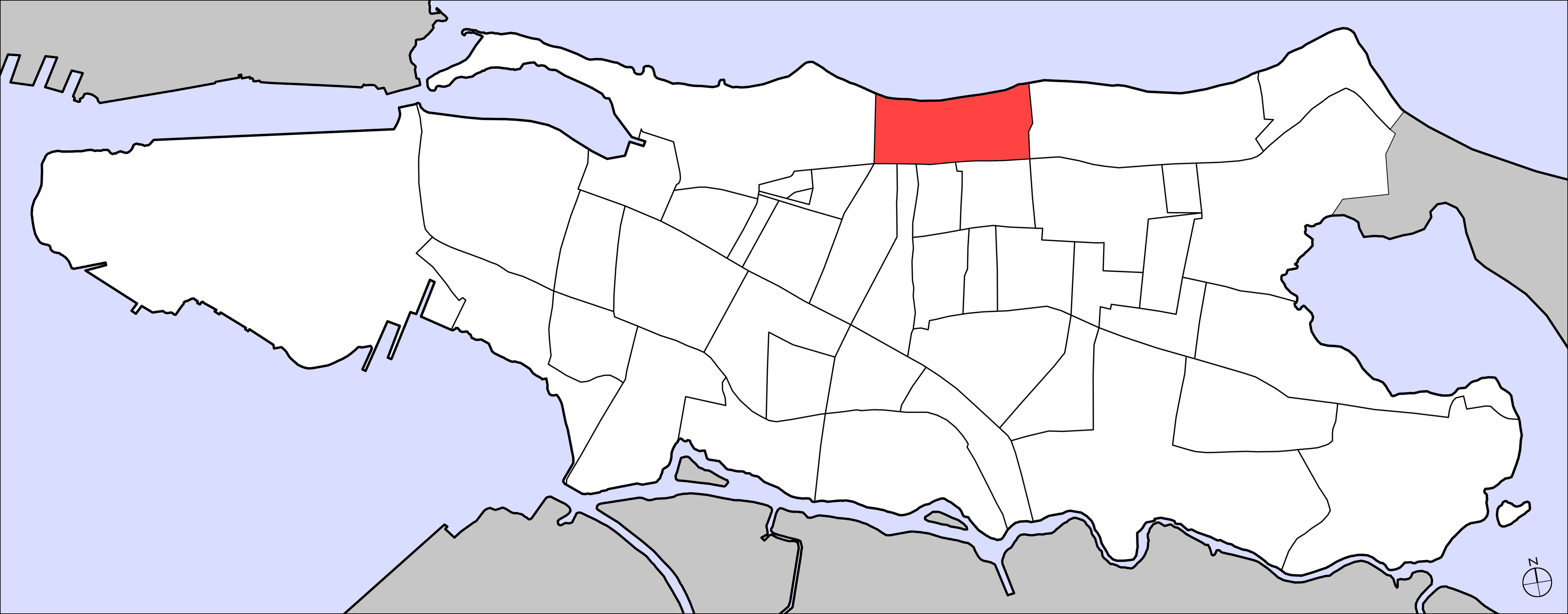
- Location of Parque within Santurce (in red)
- Coordinates: 18°27′12″N 66°3′34″W
- Commonwealth: Puerto Rico
- Municipality: San Juan
- Barrio: Santurce

Area
  - Total: .36 sq mi (0.93 km^{2})
  - Land: .12 sq mi (0.31 km^{2})
  - Water: .14 sq mi (0.36 km^{2})
- Elevation: 0 ft (0 m)

Population (2010)
  - Total: 2,871
  - Density: 23,925/sq mi (9,237/km^{2})
- Source: 2010 Census
- Time zone: UTC−4 (AST)

Parque (Spanish for ''park'') is an urbanized beachfront residential district with various upscale condos in the barrio of Santurce in San Juan, the capital municipality of Puerto Rico. Immediately next to the Condado resort area, about 2 to 6 miles (3.2 to 9.7 km) from the Old San Juan historic quarter, Isla Verde resort area, Hato Rey business center, and SJU airport, it is centered around the eastern end of Ashford Ave. and western half of McLeary Ave., extending east–west for about 0.55 miles (0.89 km) from the Ocean Park residential to Condado resort area. It is named after Parque Borinquén (Borinquén Park), known today as Parque del Indio (Indian Park), originally a large landscape park built on the beach, which was serviced by the "Parque" or "Park" tramway extension of the San Juan electric tramway beginning in 1903.

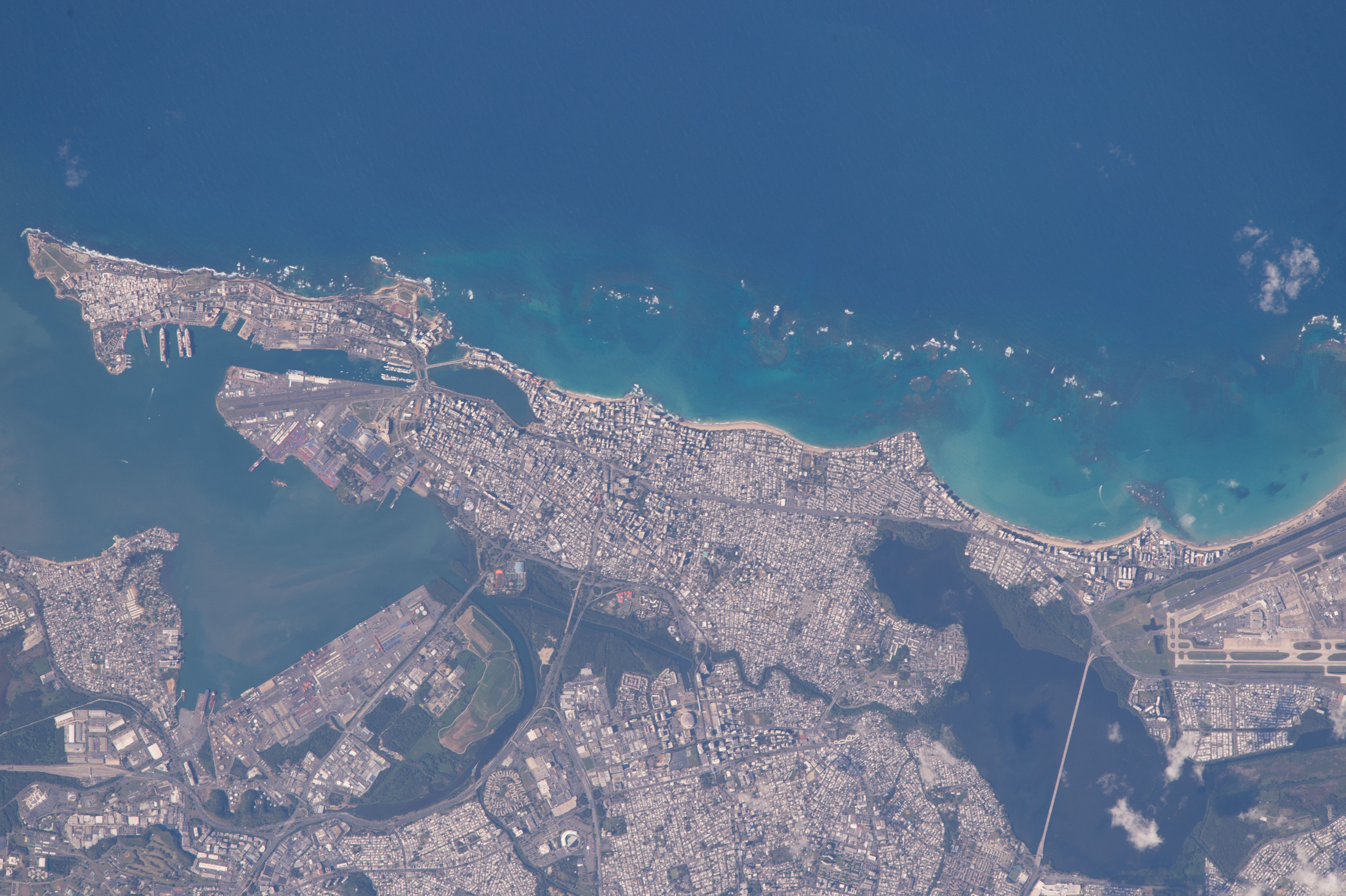
Satellite view from Old San Juan historic quarter (upper left) in San Juan Islet in the San Juan capital municipality to Isla Verde resort area (upper right) in the Carolina municipality with Parque district visible (upper center), 2016

== Description ==
One of forty subbarrios of the barrio of Santurce in the capital municipality of San Juan, the beachfront residential district of Parque is bordered by the Condado resort area to the west and the Ocean Park residential area to the east. In the west, the boundary to Condado is marked by Avenida José de Diego (José de Diego Avenue). In the east, the boundary to Ocean Park is marked by Calle Santa Ana (Santa Ana Street) and Calle María Mozco (María Mozco Street), both of which form the same street. In the south, the boundary runs along Calle Loíza (Loíza Street). In the north, it is bounded by the beach in the North Atlantic Ocean.

== History ==
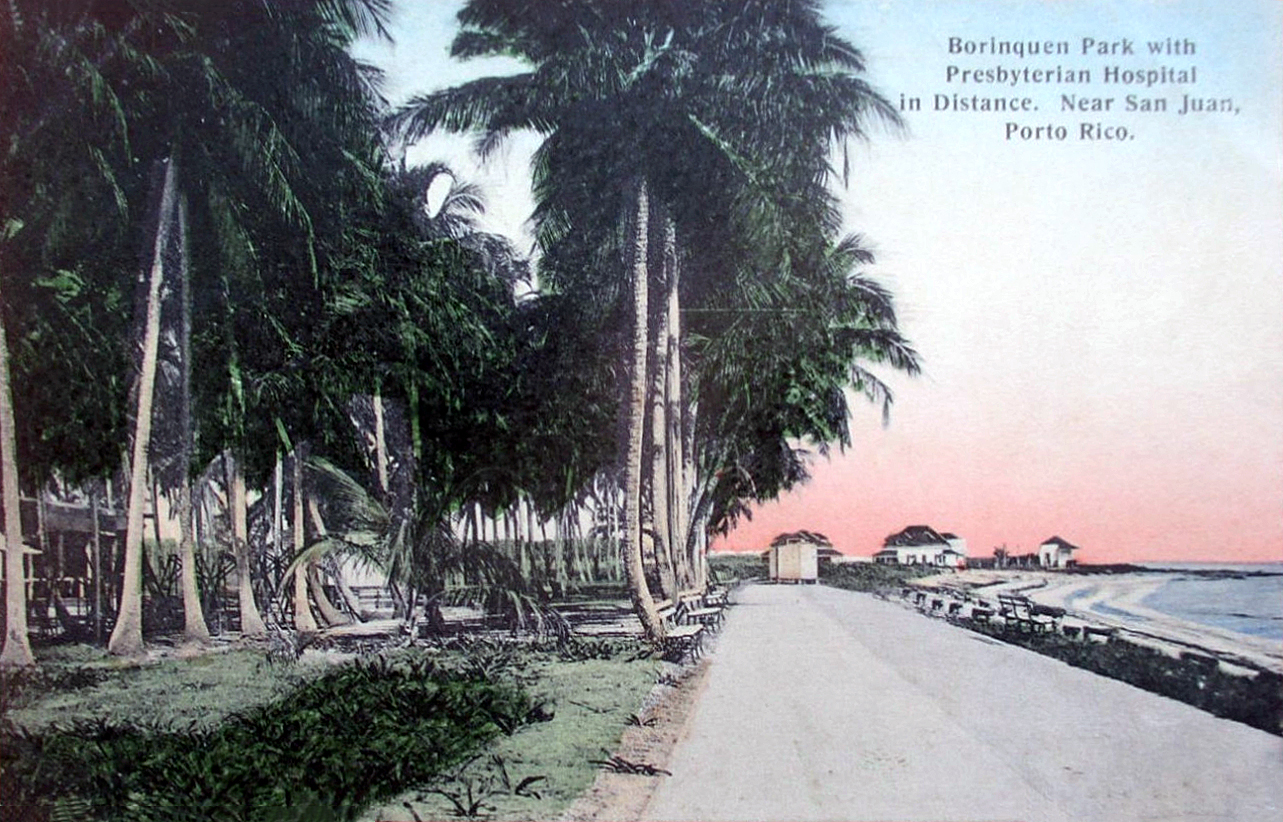
Borinquén Park (foreground) next to Ocean Park Beach with the Presbyterian Hospital, today the Ashford Presbyterian Community Hospital (background), c. 1908

Both the Borinquén Park and "Parque" or "Park" tramway extension were constructed by the San Juan light & Transit Co. (SJL&T) at the turn of the 20th century. Only a small section of the original park, known today as the Parque del Indio (Indian Park), remains next to the Park Terrace and Las Olas condos. Initially, the park covered the present-day five city blocks bounded by Avenida José de Diego (José de Diego Avenue) to the west, Calle F. Krug (F. Krug Street) to the east, Calle Loíza (Loíza Street) to the south, and the North Atlantic Ocean coast to the north. The city blocks were plotted since at least 1941.

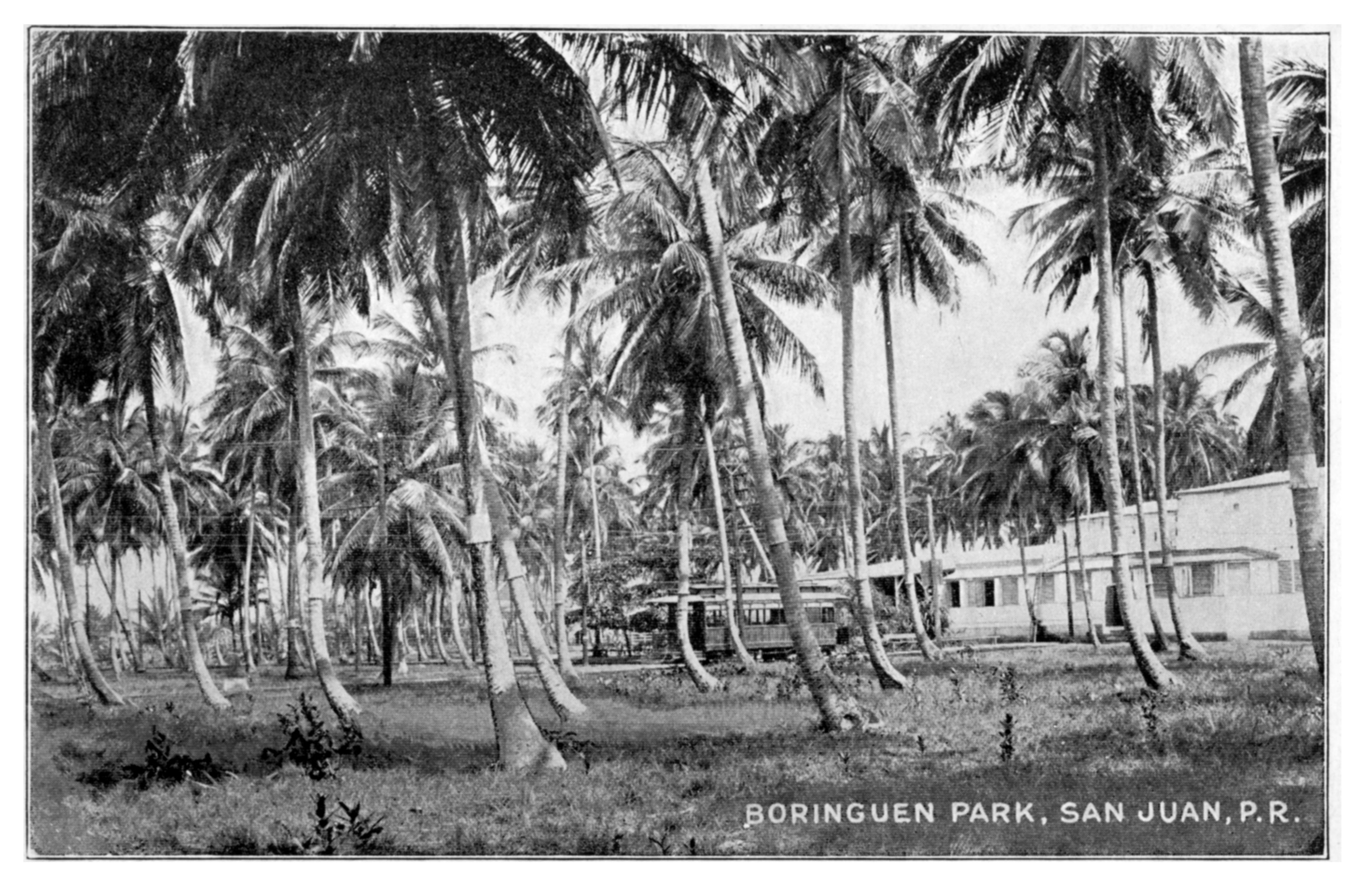

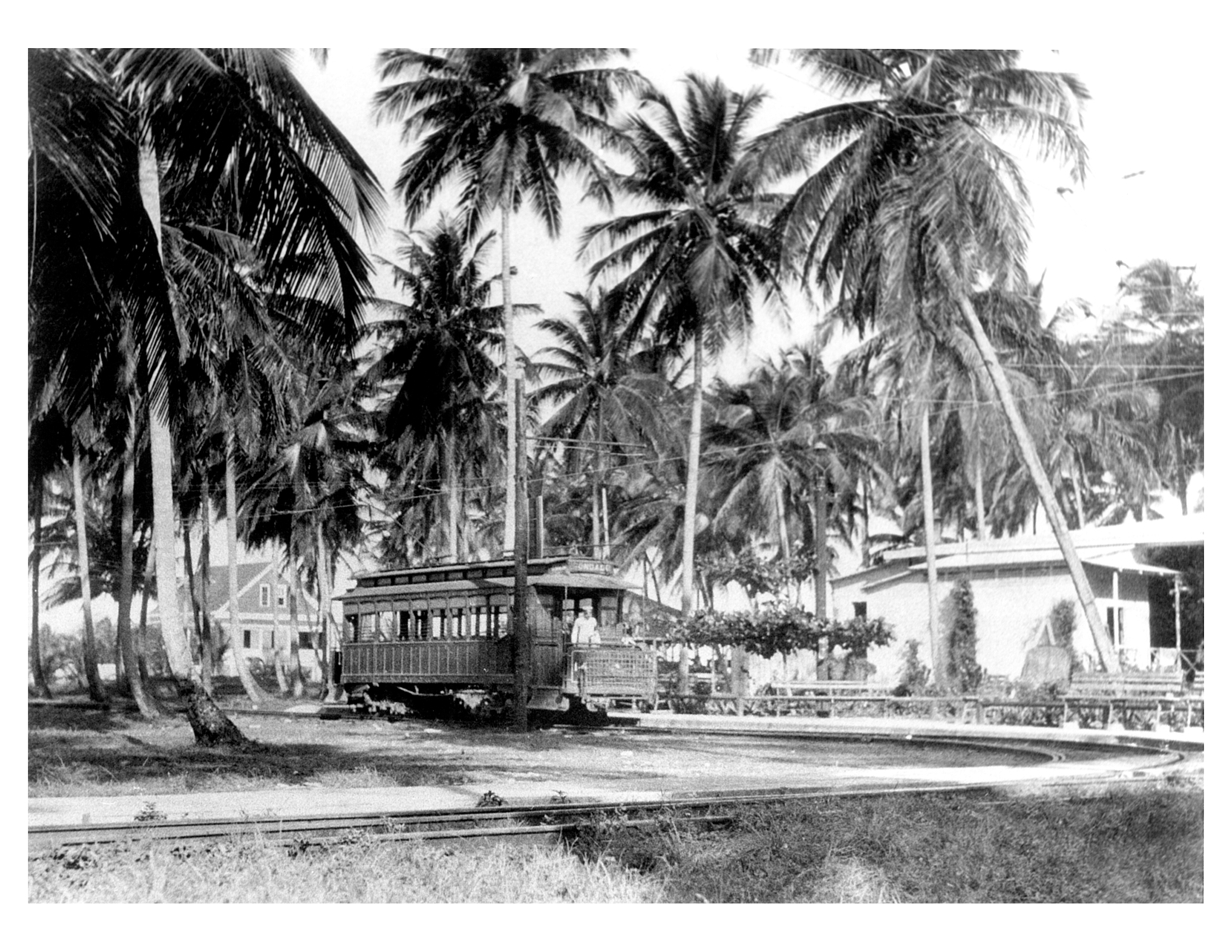
Borinquén Park and the "Parque" or "Park" passenger electric tramway, c. 1915

Demolished in 1946, the "Parque" or "Park" tramway extension used to travel north from the principal San Juan Tramway on Juan Ponce de León Avenue through Calle del Parque (Park Street) to the end of the park on the beach, which featured a movie theater where the Park Terrace and Las Olas ("the waves") condos currently stand since at least 1918.

== Demographics ==
In 1940, Parque had a population of 2,070.

In 2000, Parque had a population of 3,251.

In 2010, Parque had a population of 2,871 and a population density of 23,925 persons per square mile.

== See also ==
- List of communities in Puerto Rico
