= Ocean Park Beach =

Coordinates: 18°27′11″N 66°2′58″W

Ocean Park Beach Playa de Ocean Park Último Trolley Beach
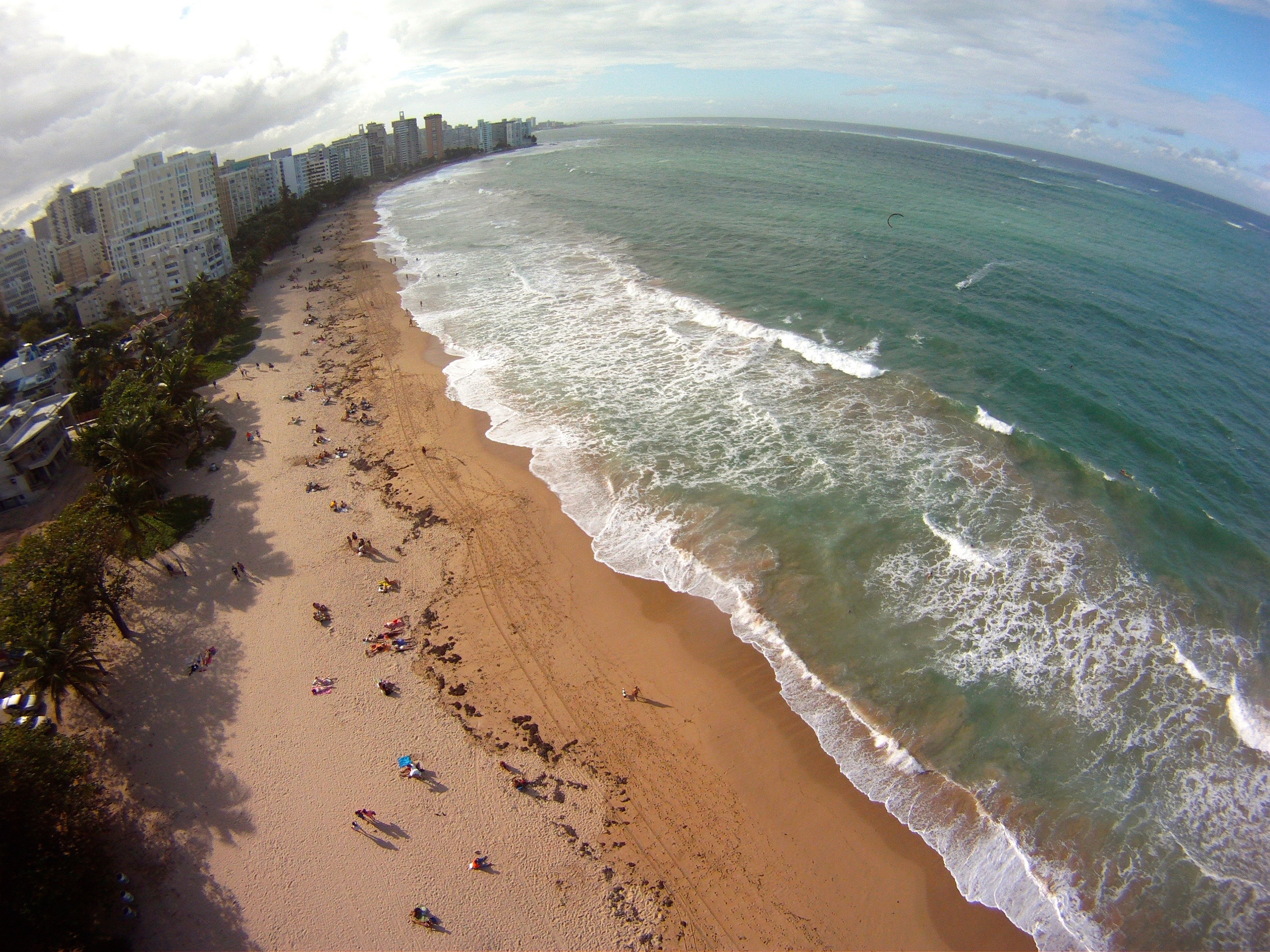
- Aerial view of Ocean Park Beach in Parque district, 2011
- Interactive map of Ocean Park Beach
- Commonwealth: Puerto Rico
- Municipality: San Juan
- Ideal Areas for: Swimming Diving/Snorkeling Surfing Wind-surfing
- Lifeguards: Available
- Safety: For All Ages

Ocean Park Beach (Spanish: Playa de Ocean Park) is a large public-access beach located in Ocean Park and Parque, upscale residential districts of the Santurce barrio in San Juan, the capital municipality of Puerto Rico. The beach used to be known as Último Trolley Beach (Playa del Último Trolley), since it was the site of the San Juan–Condado streetcar line terminal. A small section located close to Dr. José Celso Barbosa Park is still referred to as El Último Trolley.

== Description ==
Measuring almost 2 miles in length from Punta Piedrita and Parque del Indio in the west to Punta Las Marías in the east, Ocean Park Beach is the largest beach in the municipality of San Juan. Although the largest beach in the area, Ocean Park Beach is not as crowded as Condado Beach as it is more frequented by locals than visitors. This sandy beach is popular for amateur and experienced surfers and windsurfers.

== Gallery ==
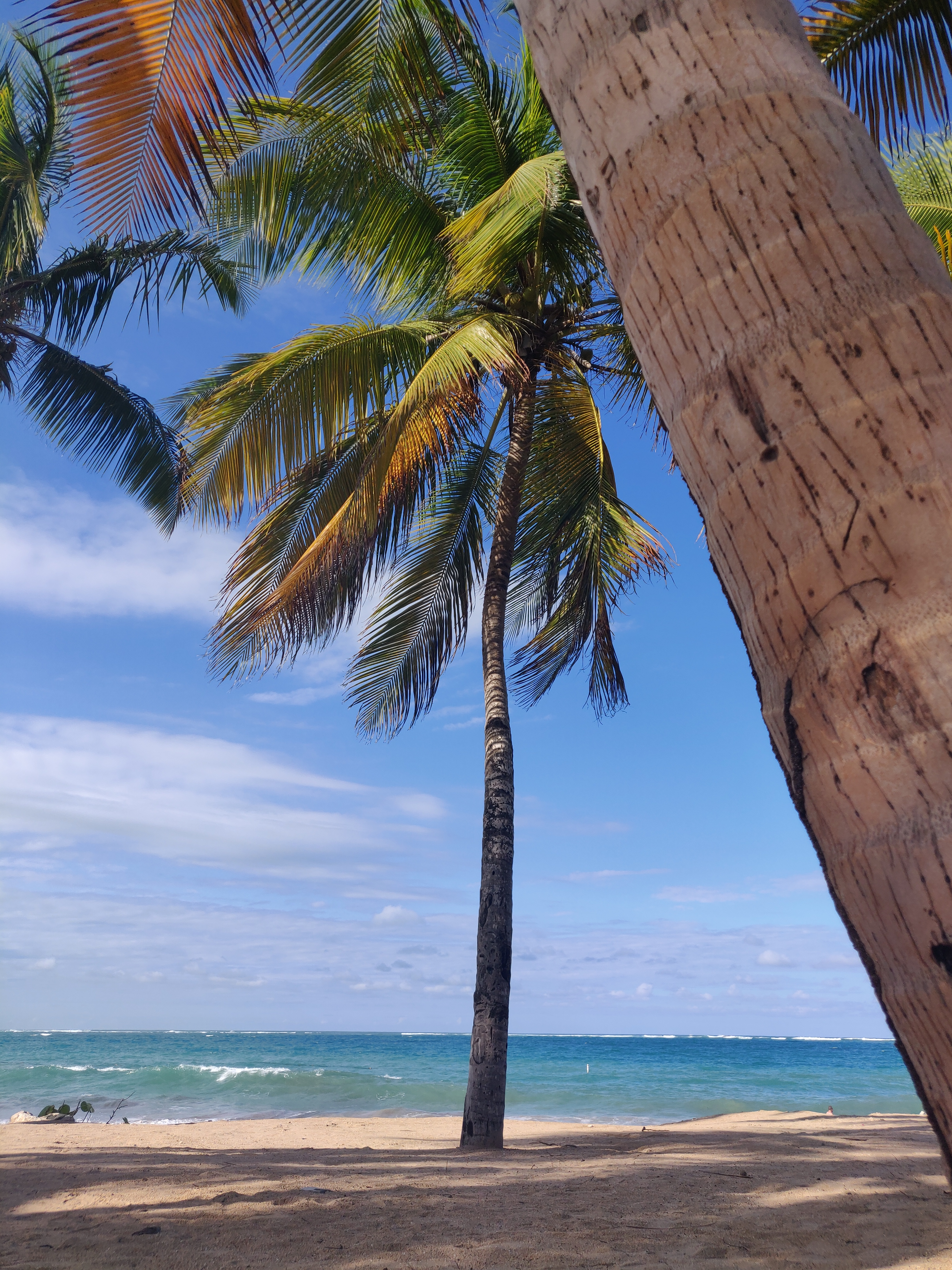
Palm trees at Ocean Park.

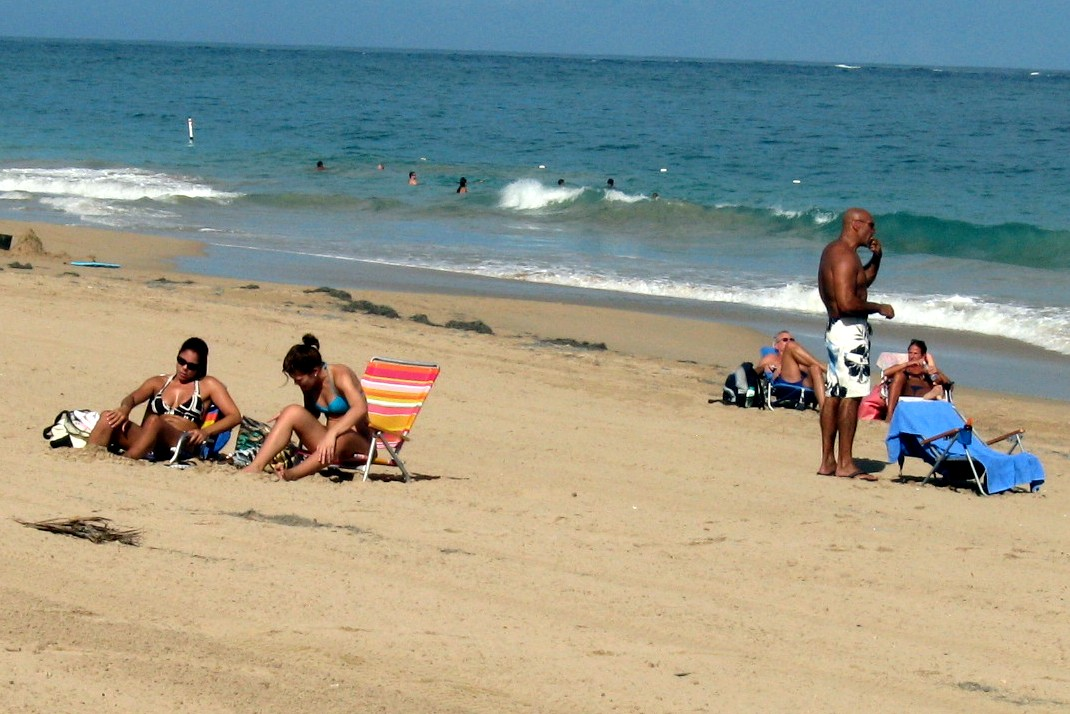
Beachgoers at Ocean Park.

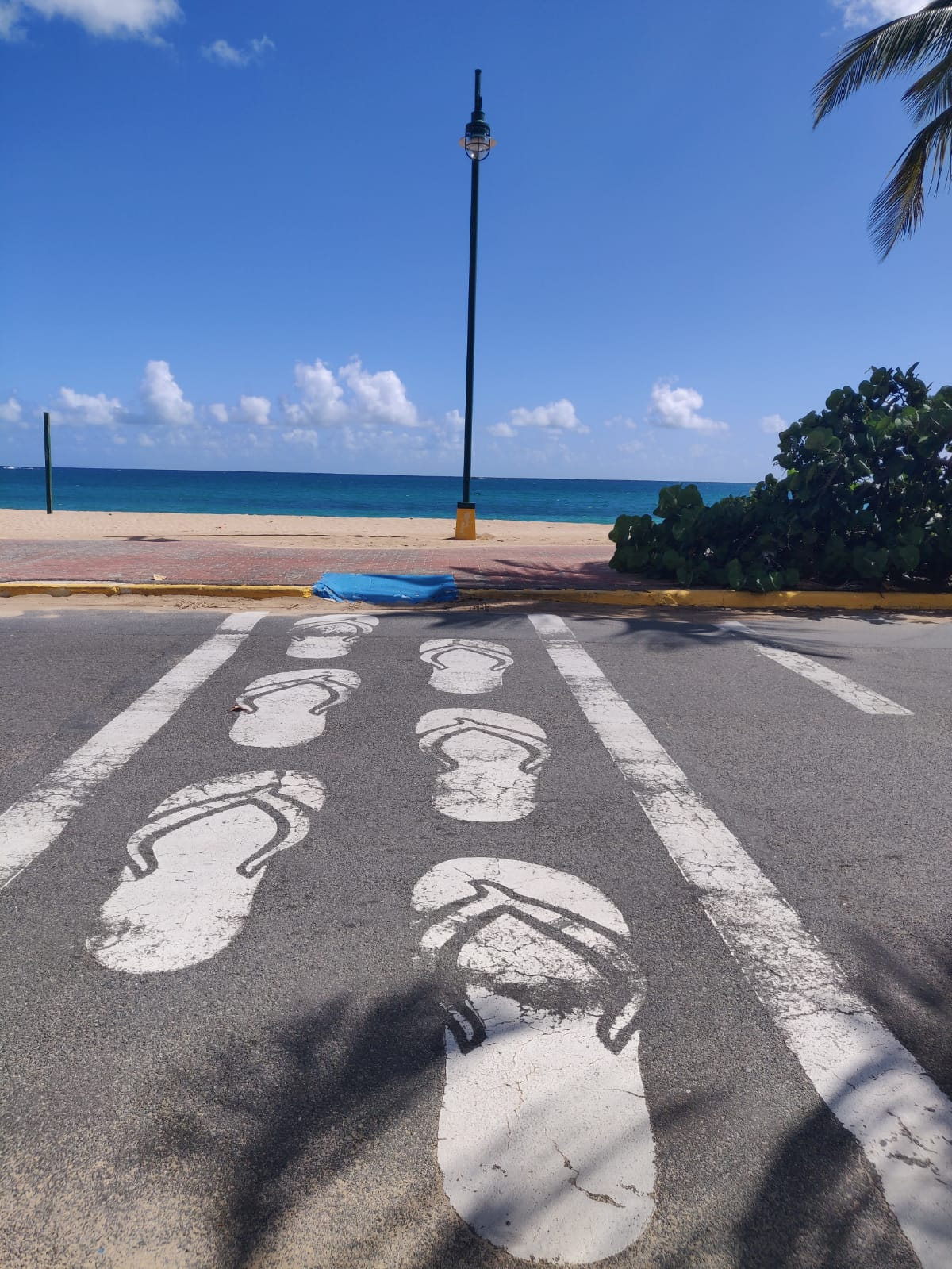
Ocean Park Beach in 2020.

== See also ==
- List of beaches in Puerto Rico
