= Isla Verde Reef =

Coral reef in Puerto Rico

Coordinates: 18°26′51″N 66°00′53″W

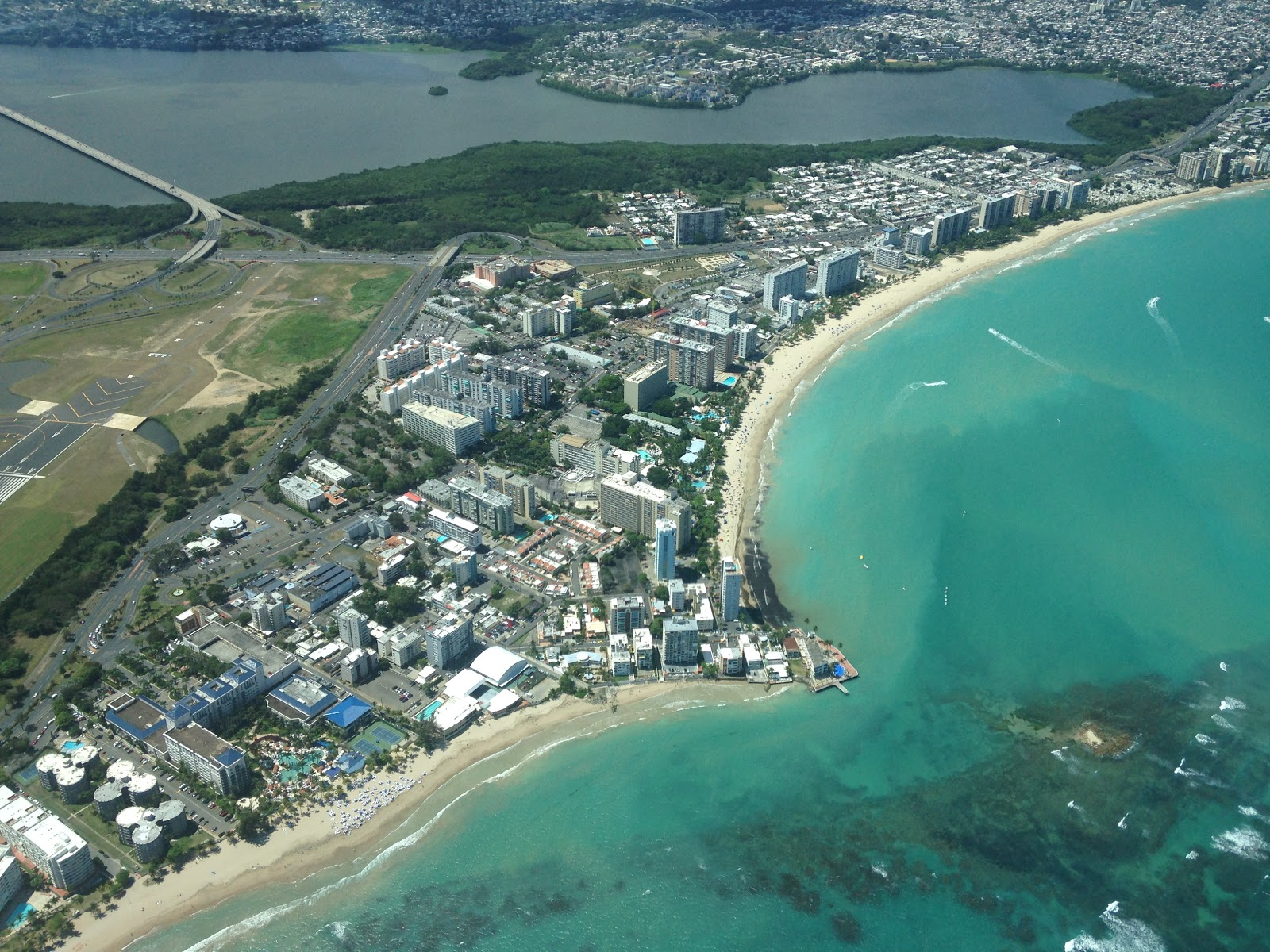
Aerial view of Isla Verde and the Isla Verde Reef near Punta del Medio (''middle point'') in Carolina

Isla Verde Reef (Spanish: Arrecife de Isla Verde) is a coral reef surrounding the small Isla Verde (''green island'') cay in the northeastern Atlantic coast of the main island of Puerto Rico. Located near the shoreline at Punta del Medio (''middle point'') in the resort and residential district of Isla Verde in the municipality of Carolina, the reef, protected as the Isla Verde Reef Marine Reserve (Reserva Marina Arrecife de Isla Verde), is part of a larger reef system extending parallel to the coasts of Carolina and the neighboring capital municipality of San Juan. The reserve is home to endangered species, including manatees and sea turtles, and federally protected coral species like the elkhorn coral. The reef is also protected by organizations like Arrecifes Pro Ciudad and Para la Naturaleza (Puerto Rico Conservation Trust), with support from the University of Puerto Rico at Bayamón.

== See also ==
- List of reefs
- Protected areas of Puerto Rico
