= Las Marías (Santurce) =

Subbarrio of Santurce in San Juan, Puerto Rico

Coordinates: 18°27′10″N 66°02′25″W

- Subbarrio
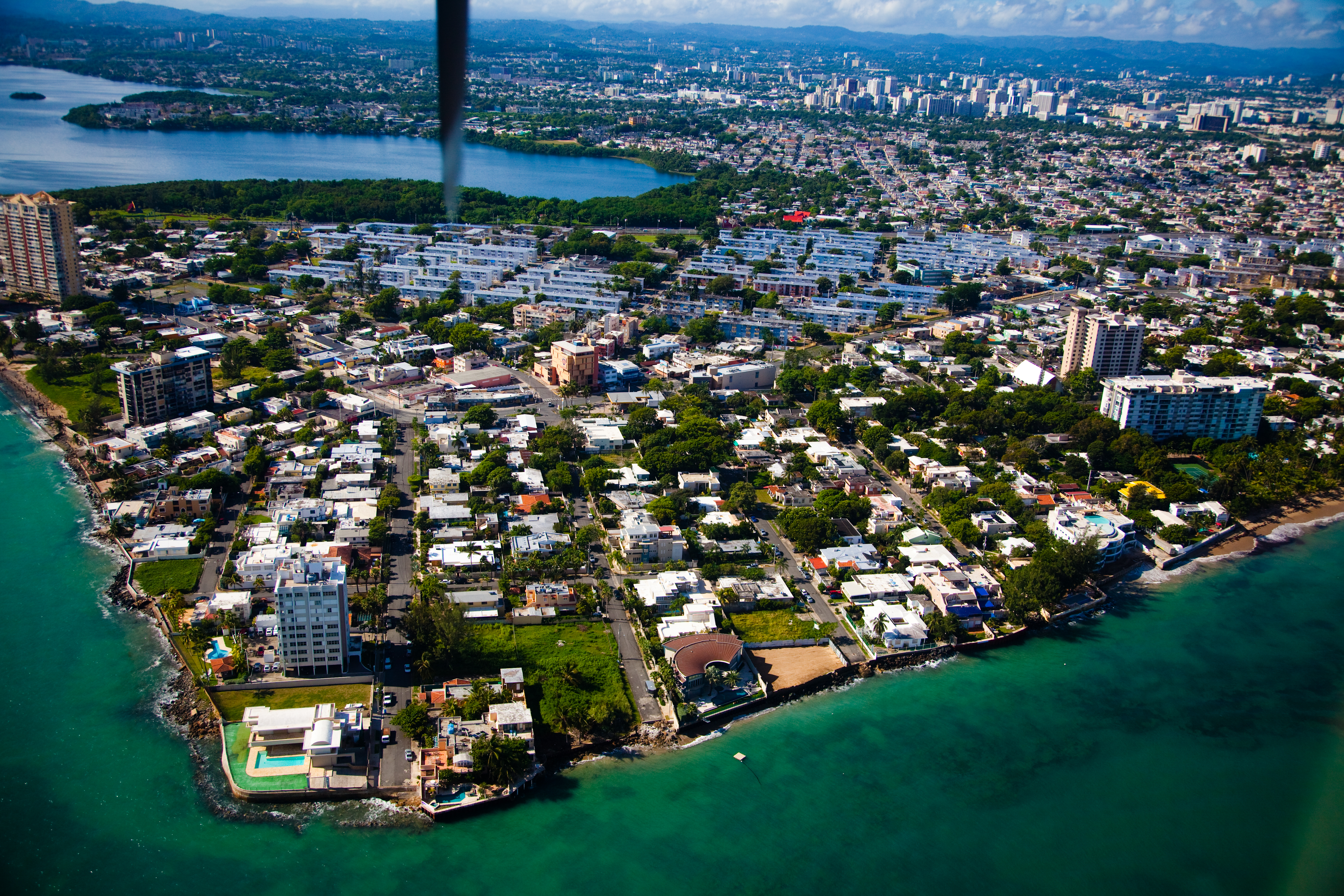
- Las Marías (foreground) in-between Isla Verde (left) and Ocean Park (right) districts

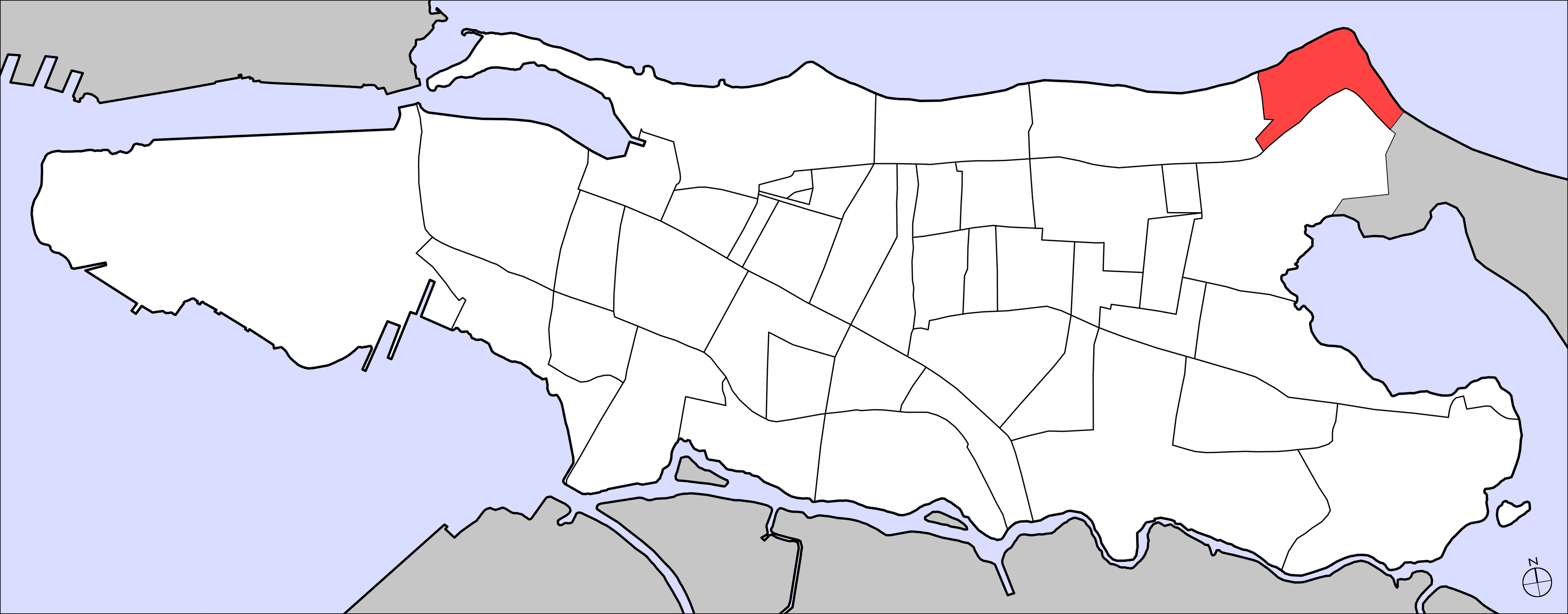
- Commonwealth: Puerto Rico
- Municipality: San Juan
- Barrio: Santurce

Area
  - Total: .42 sq mi (1.1 km^{2})
  - Land: .09 sq mi (0.23 km^{2})
  - Water: .33 sq mi (0.85 km^{2})
- Elevation: 0 ft (0 m)

Population (2010)
  - Total: 895
  - Density: 9,944.4/sq mi (3,839.6/km^{2})
- Source: 2010 Census
- Time zone: UTC−4 (AST)

Las Marías also known as Puntas las Marías is one of the forty subbarrios of Santurce, San Juan, Puerto Rico.

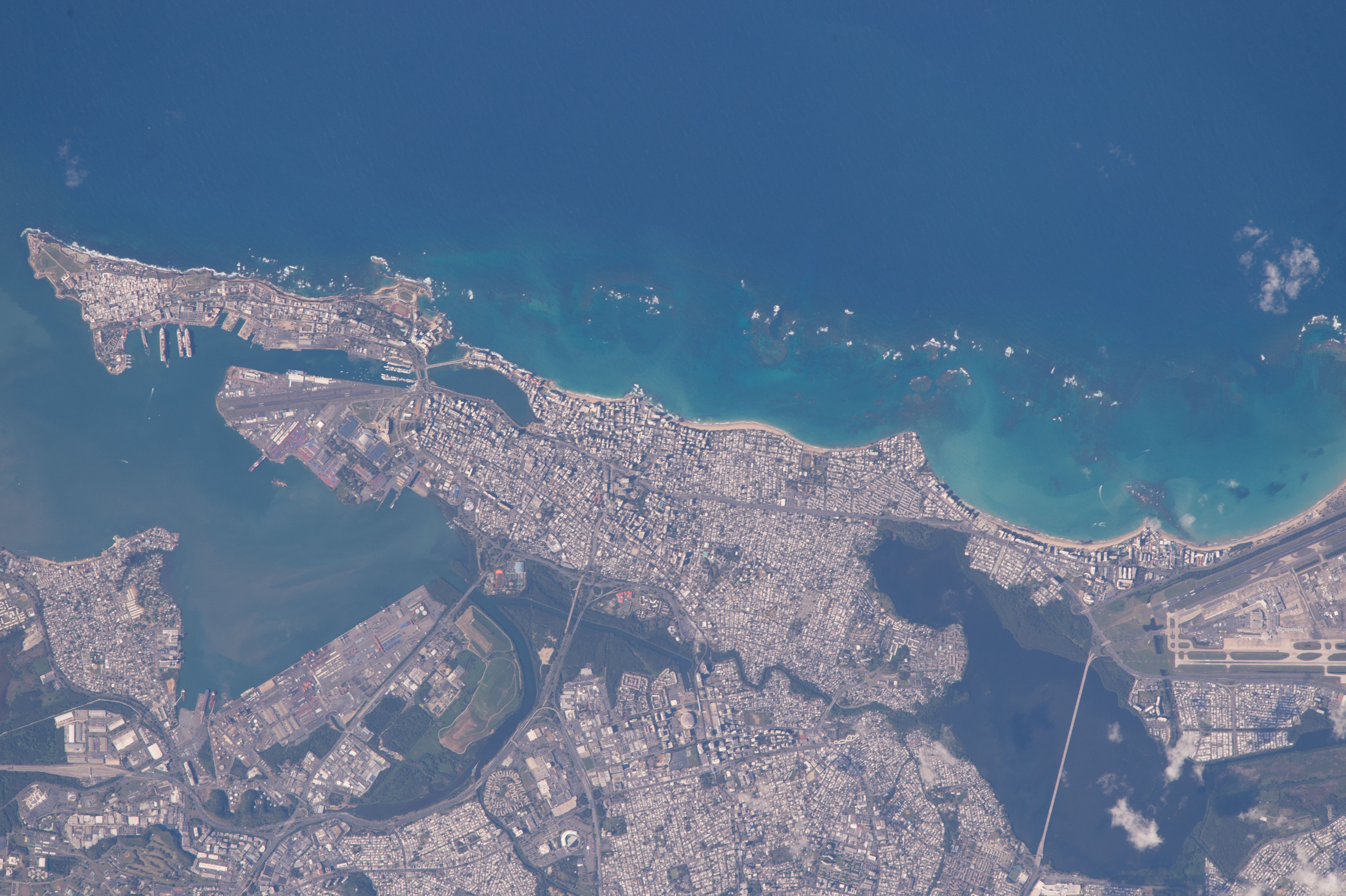
Satellite view from Old San Juan historic quarter (upper left) in San Juan Islet in the San Juan capital municipality to Isla Verde resort area (upper right) in the Carolina municipality with Las Marías (upper center-right) visible, 2016

== Demographics ==
In 1940, Las Marías had a population of 250.

In 2000, Las Marías had a population of 1,172.

In 2010, Las Marías had a population of 895 and a population density of 9,944.4 persons per square mile.

== Description ==
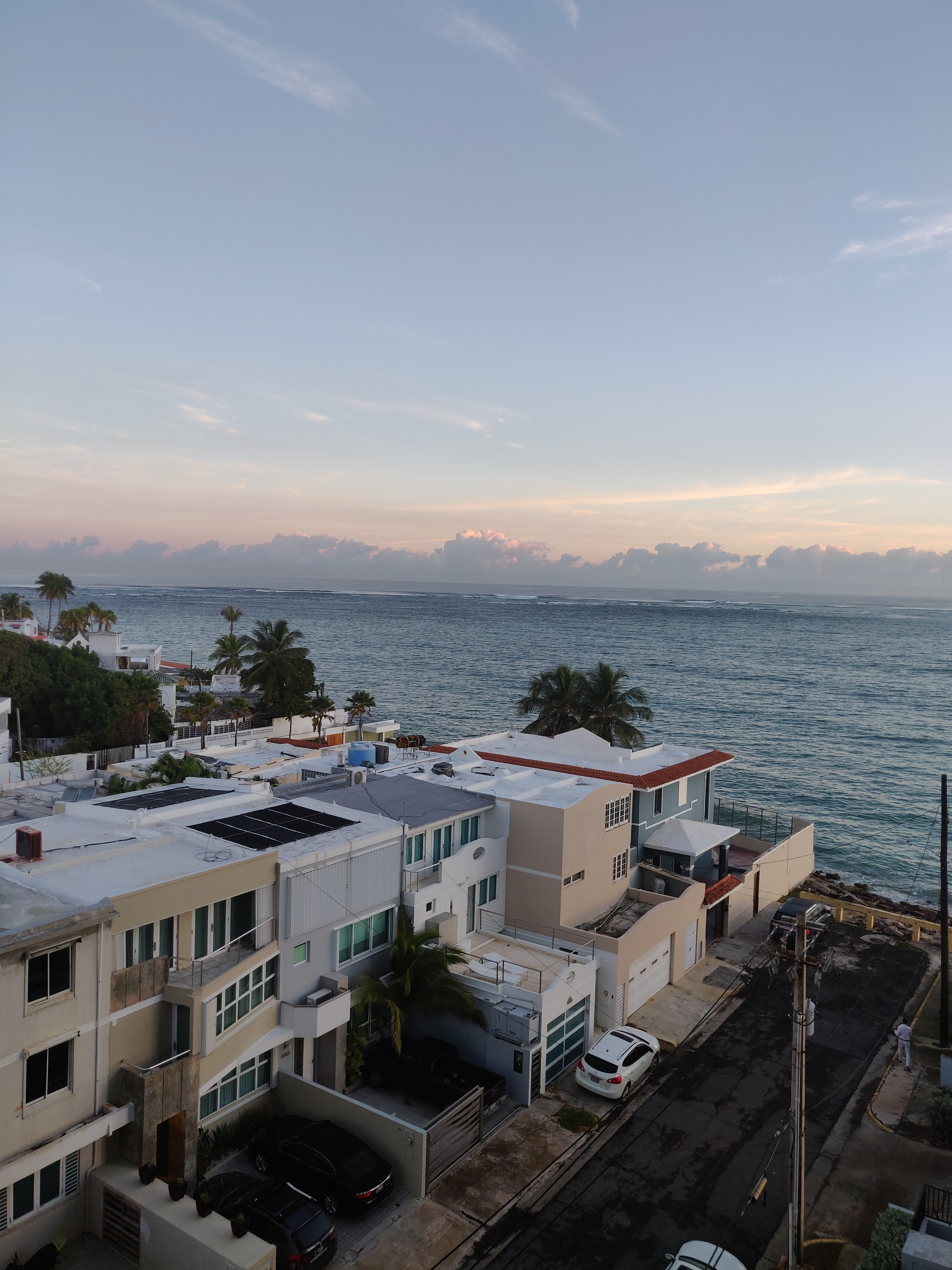
Punta las Marías (Marías Point) in Las Marías district, 2020

It is part of the Ocean Park beach community and connects Santurce with the city of Carolina through the Isla Verde touristic boulevard.

== See also ==
- List of communities in Puerto Rico
