= Ocean Park (Santurce) =

Subbarrio of Santurce in San Juan, Puerto Rico

Coordinates: 18°27′09″N 66°02′59″W

- Subbarrio
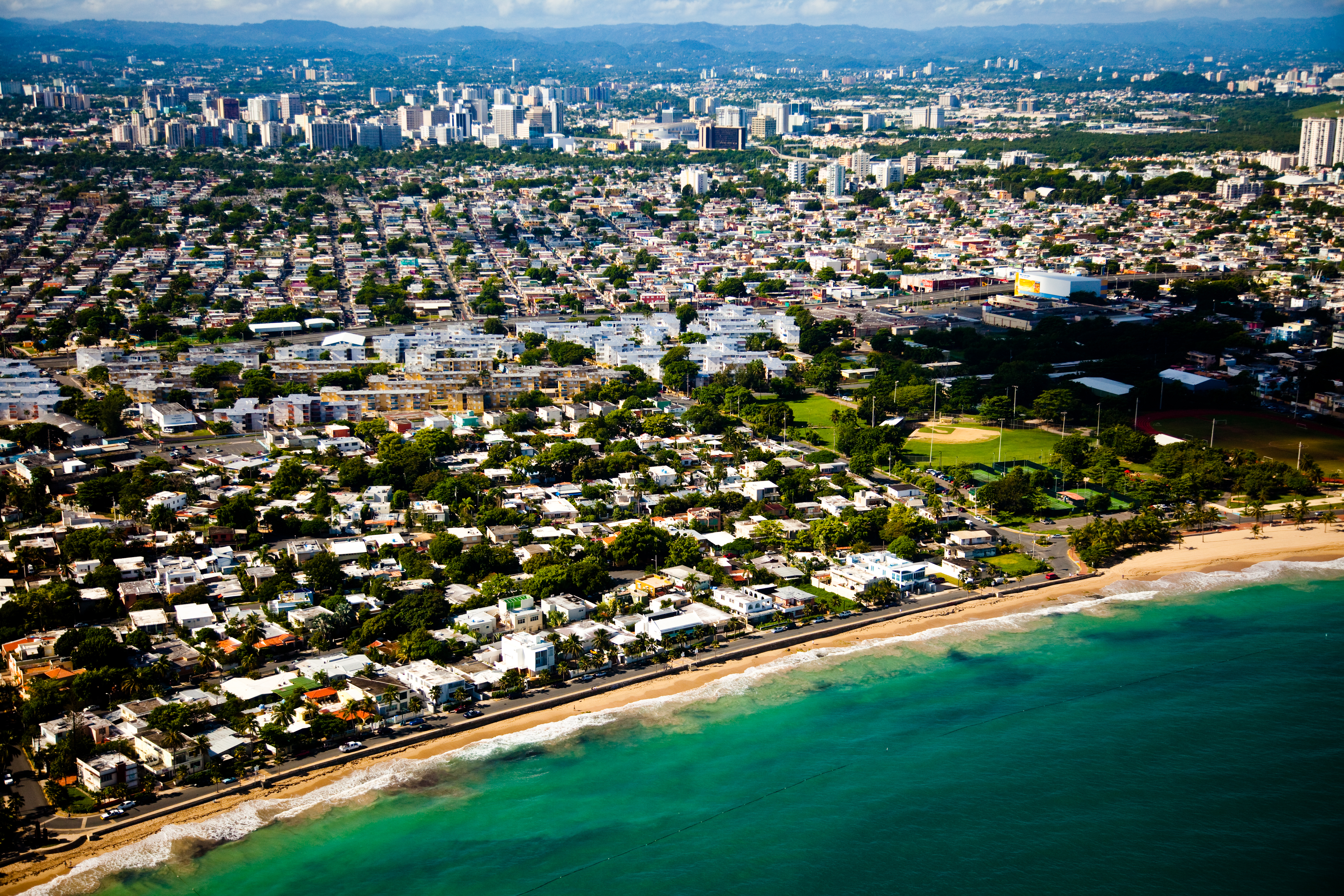
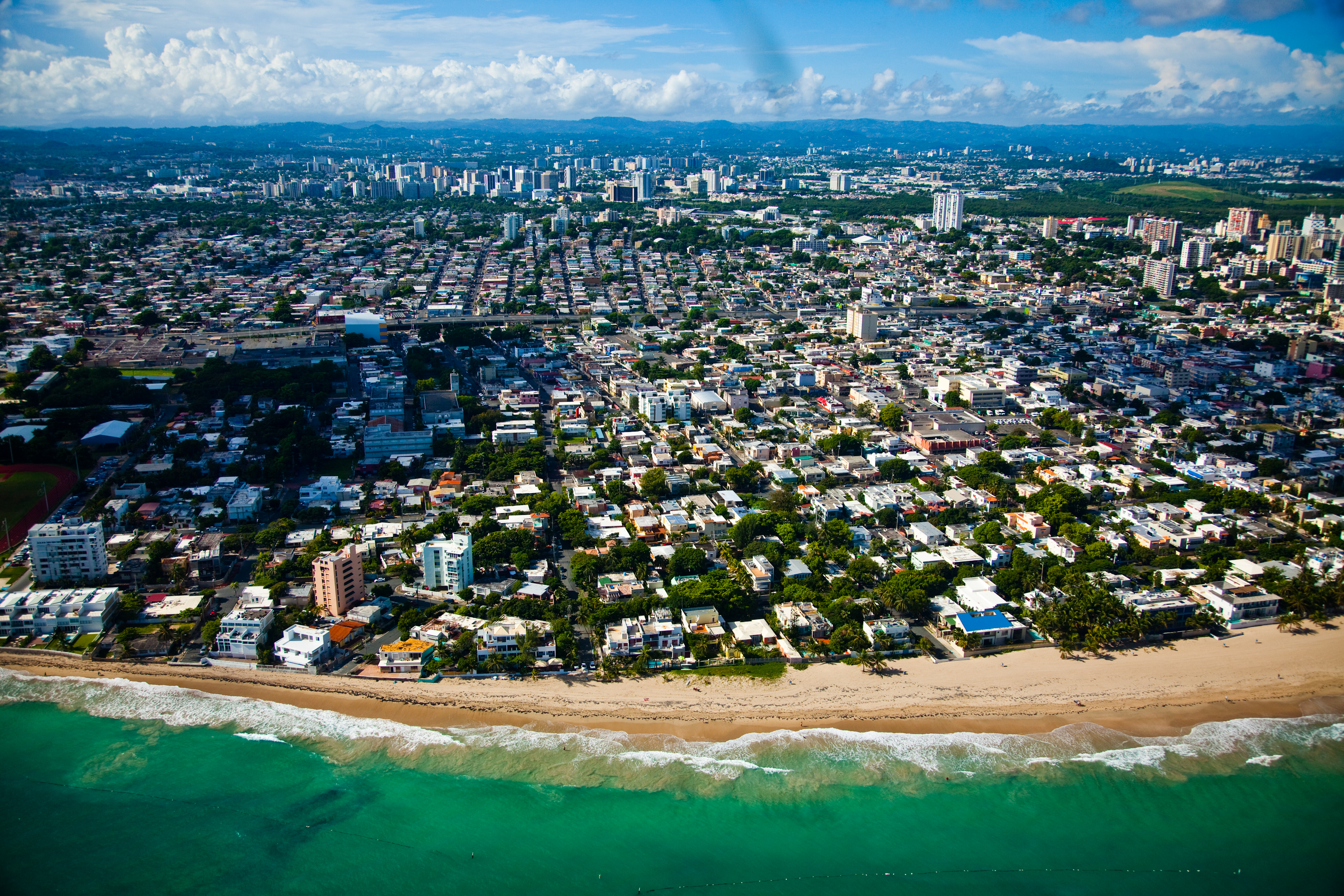
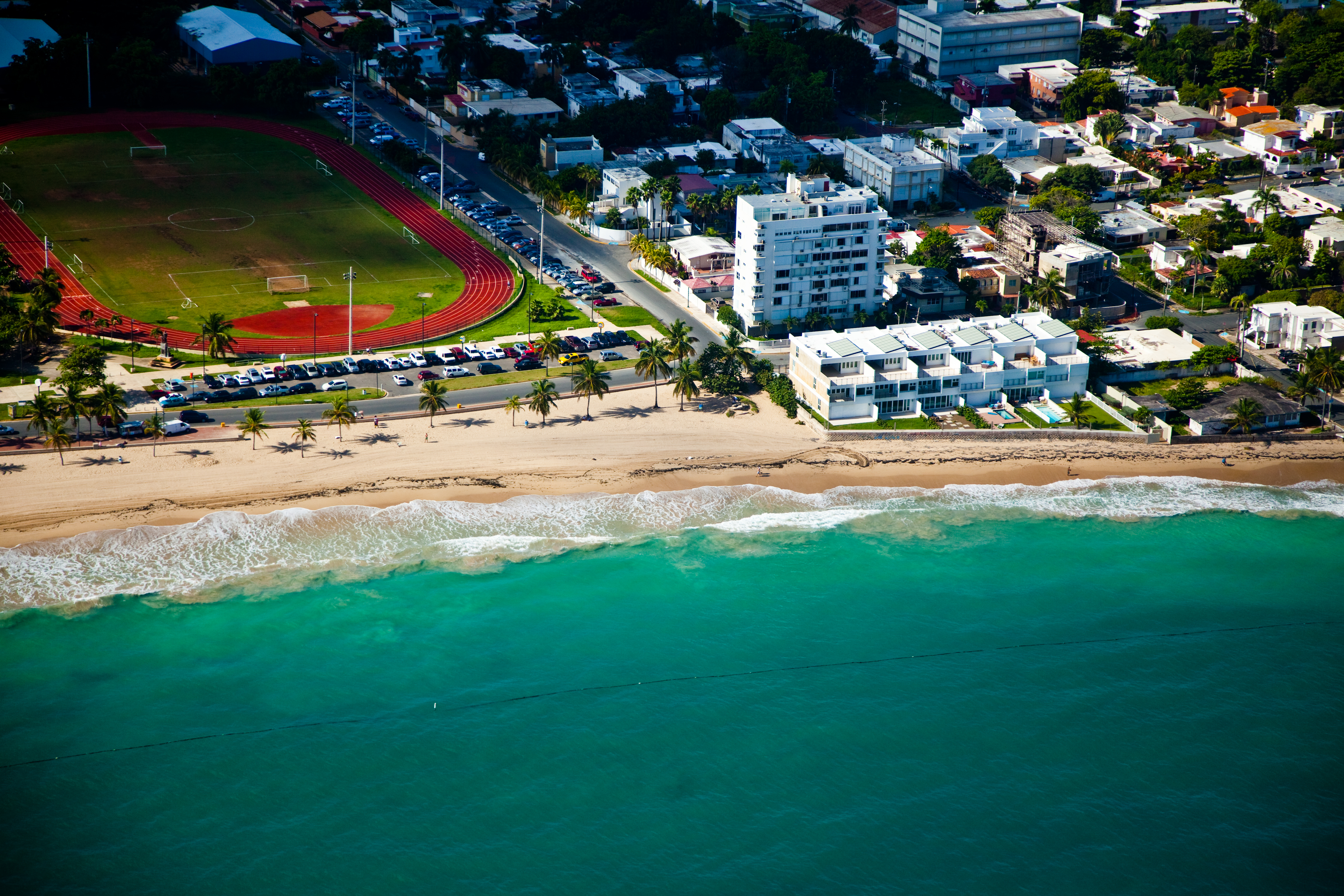
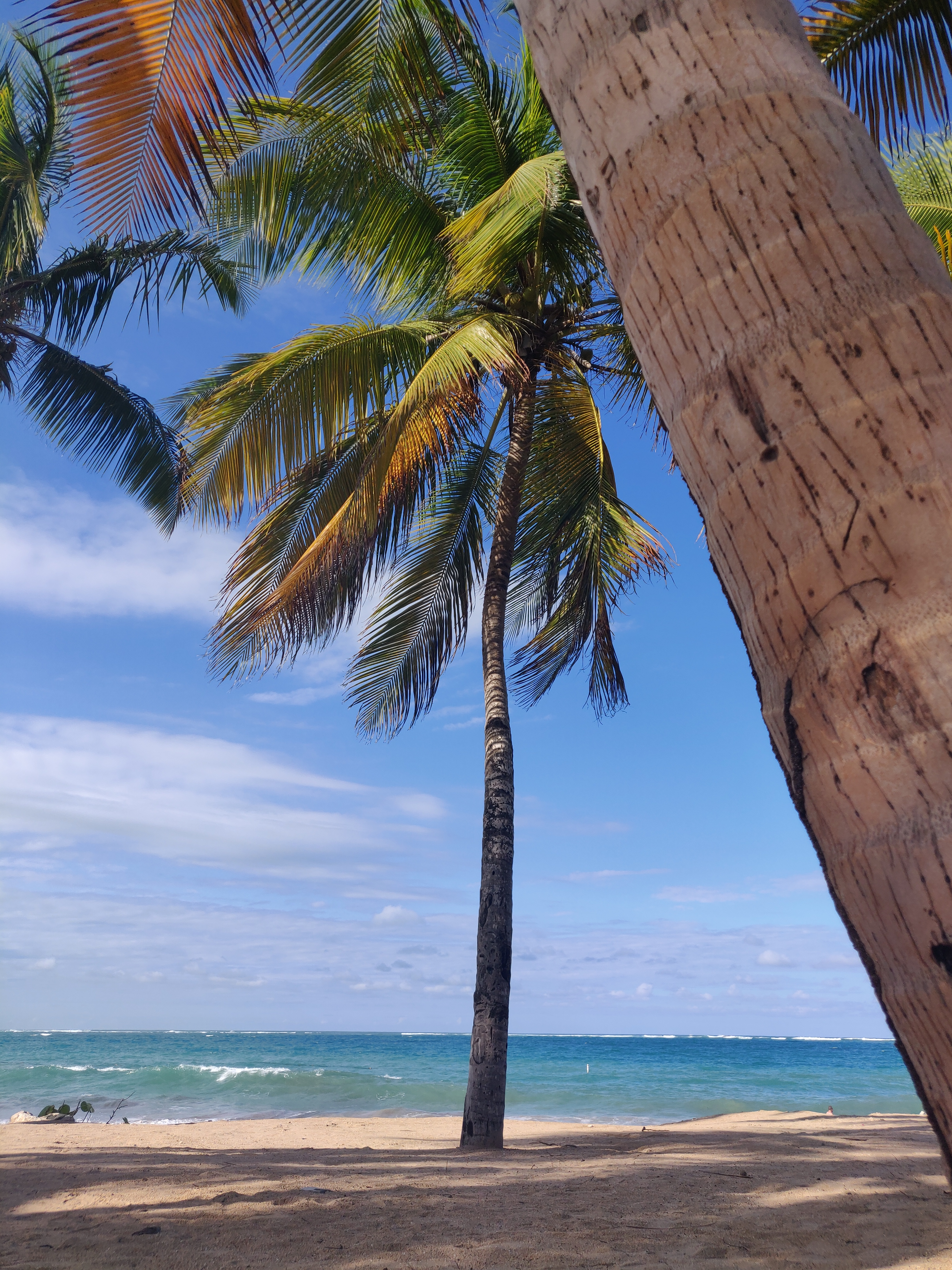
- Western Las Marías and eastern Ocean Park districts (foreground) Western Ocean Park and eastern Parque districts (foreground) Dr. José Celso Barbosa; Park (left) Ocean Park Beach

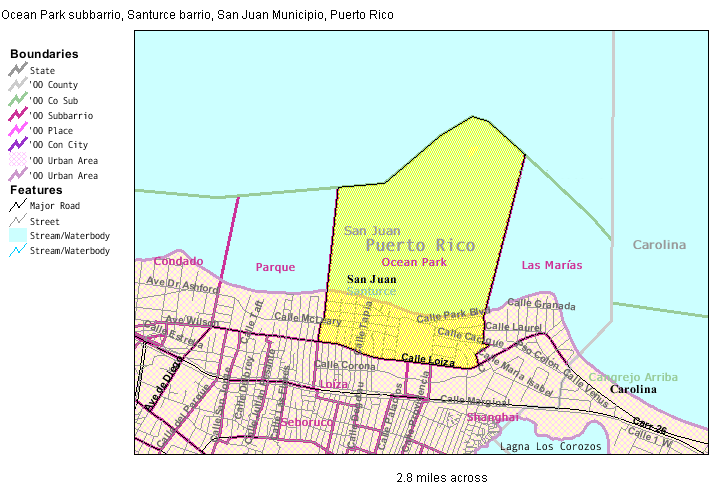
- Ocean Park limits within Santurce barrio
- Commonwealth: Puerto Rico
- Municipality: San Juan
- Barrio: Santurce

Area
  - Total: .83 sq mi (2.1 km^{2})
  - Land: .20 sq mi (0.52 km^{2})
  - Water: .63 sq mi (1.6 km^{2})
- Elevation: 0 ft (0 m)

Population (2010)
  - Total: 1,667
  - Density: 8,335/sq mi (3,218/km^{2})
- Source: 2010 Census
- Time zone: UTC−4 (AST)

Ocean Park is an urbanized beachfront residential district with various upscale guest houses in the barrio of Santurce in San Juan, the capital municipality of Puerto Rico. Located about 0.50 to 6 miles (0.80 to 9.66 km) from the Old San Juan historic quarter, Condado and Isla Verde resort areas, Hato Rey business center, and SJU airport, it is centered around the western half of McLeary Avenue, extending east–west for about 0.85 miles (1.37 km) from the Parque to Las Marías residential areas. It is named after Parque Borinquén (Borinquén Park), a large landscape park built on the beach, which was serviced by the "Parque" or "Park" tramway extension of the San Juan electric tramway from 1903 to 1946. It is one of the forty subbarrios of Santurce.

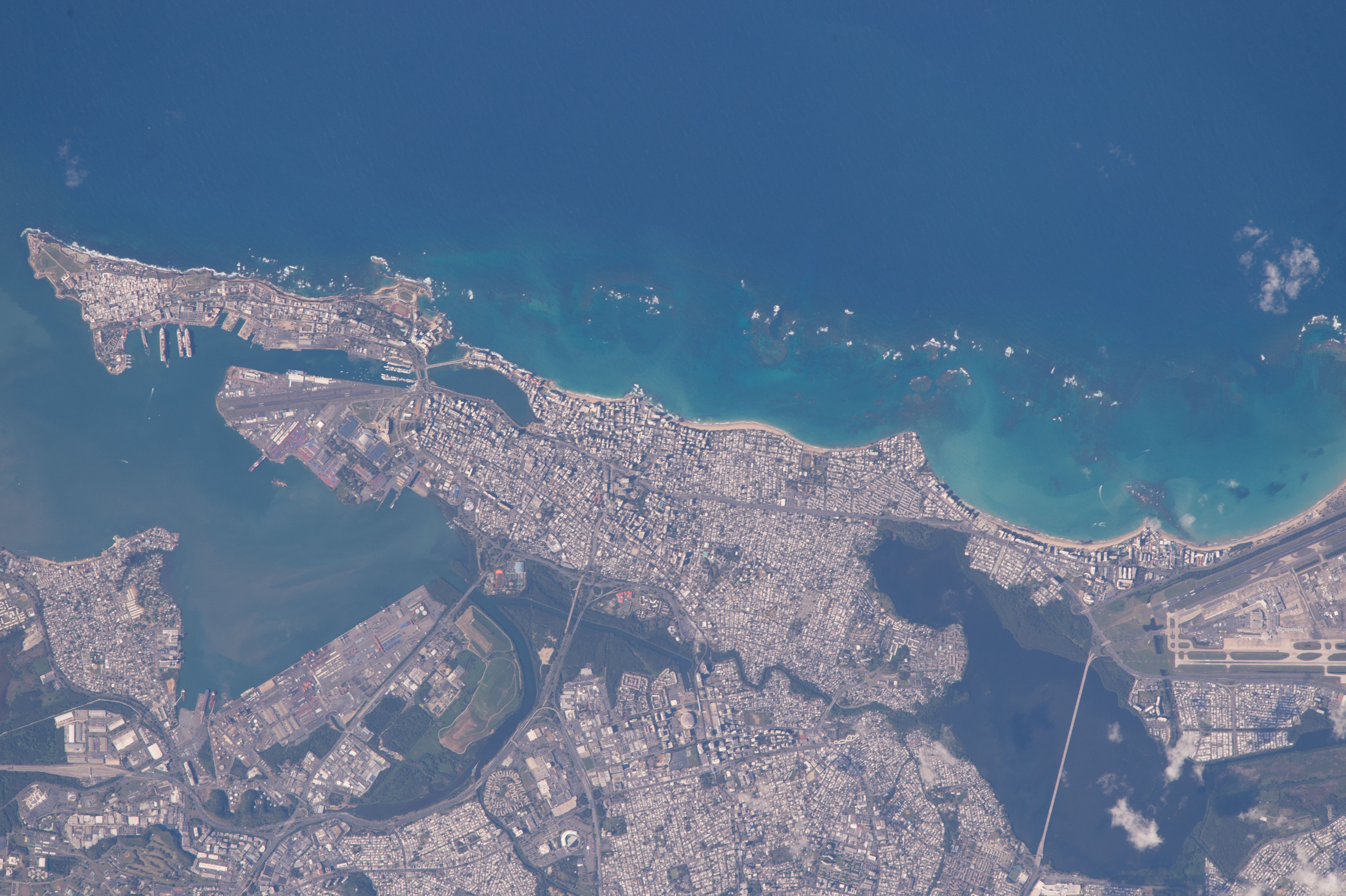
Satellite view from Old San Juan historic quarter (upper left) in San Juan Islet in the San Juan capital municipality to Isla Verde resort area (upper right) in the Carolina municipality with Ocean Park district visible (upper center), 2016

== Demographics ==
In 1940, Ocean Park had a population of 583.

In 2000, Ocean Park had a population of 1,976 and a land area of 0.52 square kilometres (0.20 sq mi).

In 2010, Ocean Park had a population of 1,667 and a population density of 8,335 persons per square mile.

== Description ==
Ocean Park is bound on the east by Calle Guerrero Noble and its straight extension to the beach, a short piece of Calle Cacique running east to connect to Calle Teniente Rivera, and the connecting piece of Calle Soldado Cruz to Calle Loíza. The southern border runs to Calle Loíza, but excluding same. In the west, it is Calle María Mozco (northern part) and Calle Santa Ana. The north is bordered by the beach and the Atlantic Ocean. Through the center runs Avenida McLeary where cafes, pubs and some services line the street.

Calle Loíza is a "trendy spot" with new businesses, bars, restaurants and boutiques.

Ocean Park is located between Condado and Isla Verde beaches making it an essential tranquil, tree-lined street residential neighborhood, with numerous examples of single-family homes from the decades between 1930 and 1950. Small bed-and-breakfast inns, which blend in with the residential community, dot the area. Its wide oceanfront and offshore reefs prevent large waves from reaching the beach, which is popular with trendy beachgoers. Strong seasonal onshore trade winds make the area popular for kitesurfing and windsurfing.

At the right of the barrio is the Parque Barbosa and the residential area of Santa Teresita, forming the eastern part of the barrio. Parque Barbosa, also known as Ultimo Trolley (Last Tram) is the home of the Ocean Park Marlins Futbol Club, a football team with categories from 5-year-old kids to "Superior" (semi-professional) both for female and male footballers. Último Trolley got its name because it was the last electric streetcar that crossed the streets of San Juan from 1901 to 1946 and was placed in the park and operated as a restaurant.

About one kilometer off the beach is the small rocky Island Stone which is also part of the area, measuring about 100 by 50 meters.

== Gallery ==
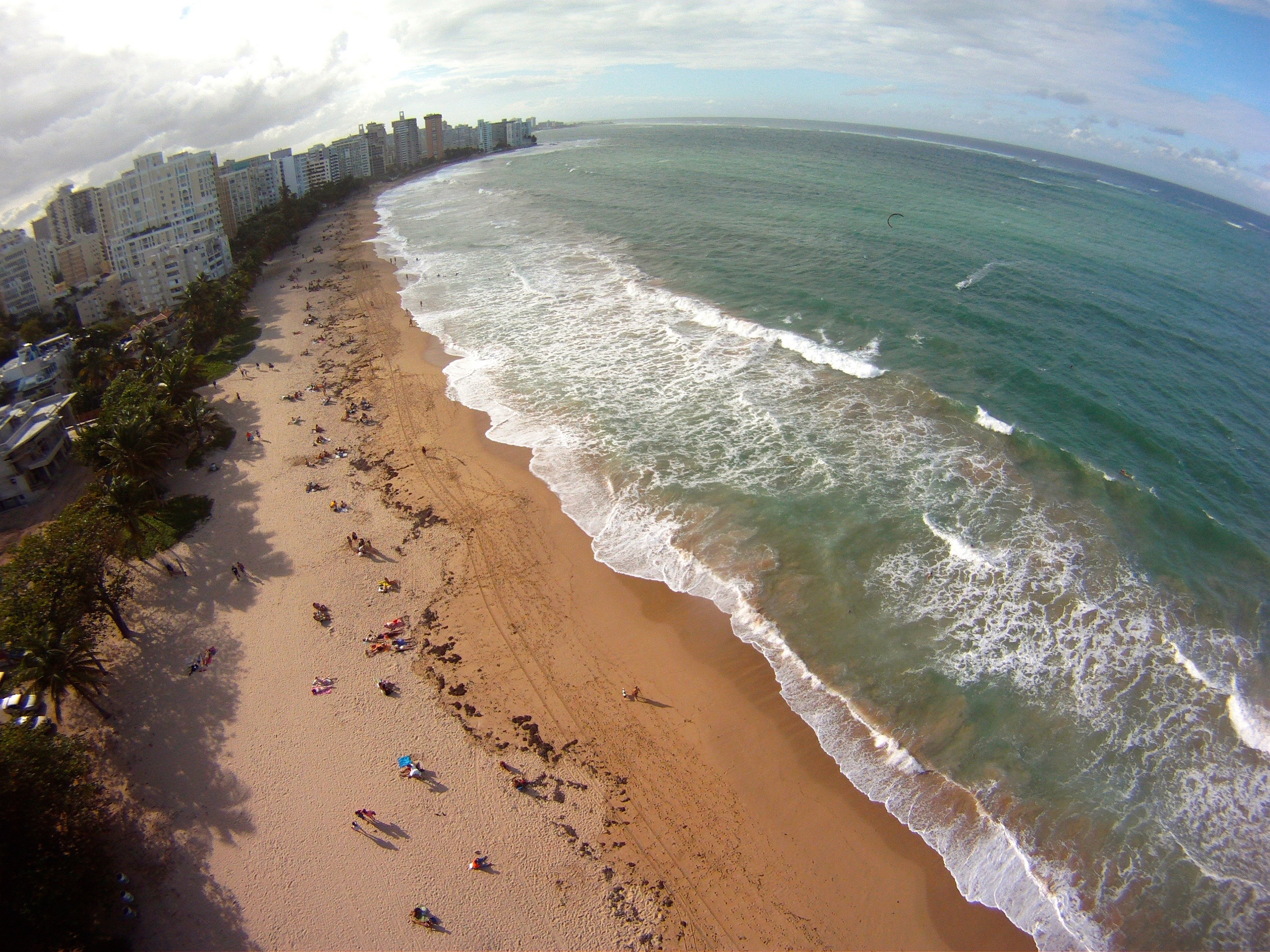
Aerial photo of Ocean Park and beach

== See also ==
- Ocean Park Beach
- List of communities in Puerto Rico
