= Isla Verde, Puerto Rico =

Coastal area of Carolina, Puerto Rico

Isla Verde
- Subbarrio
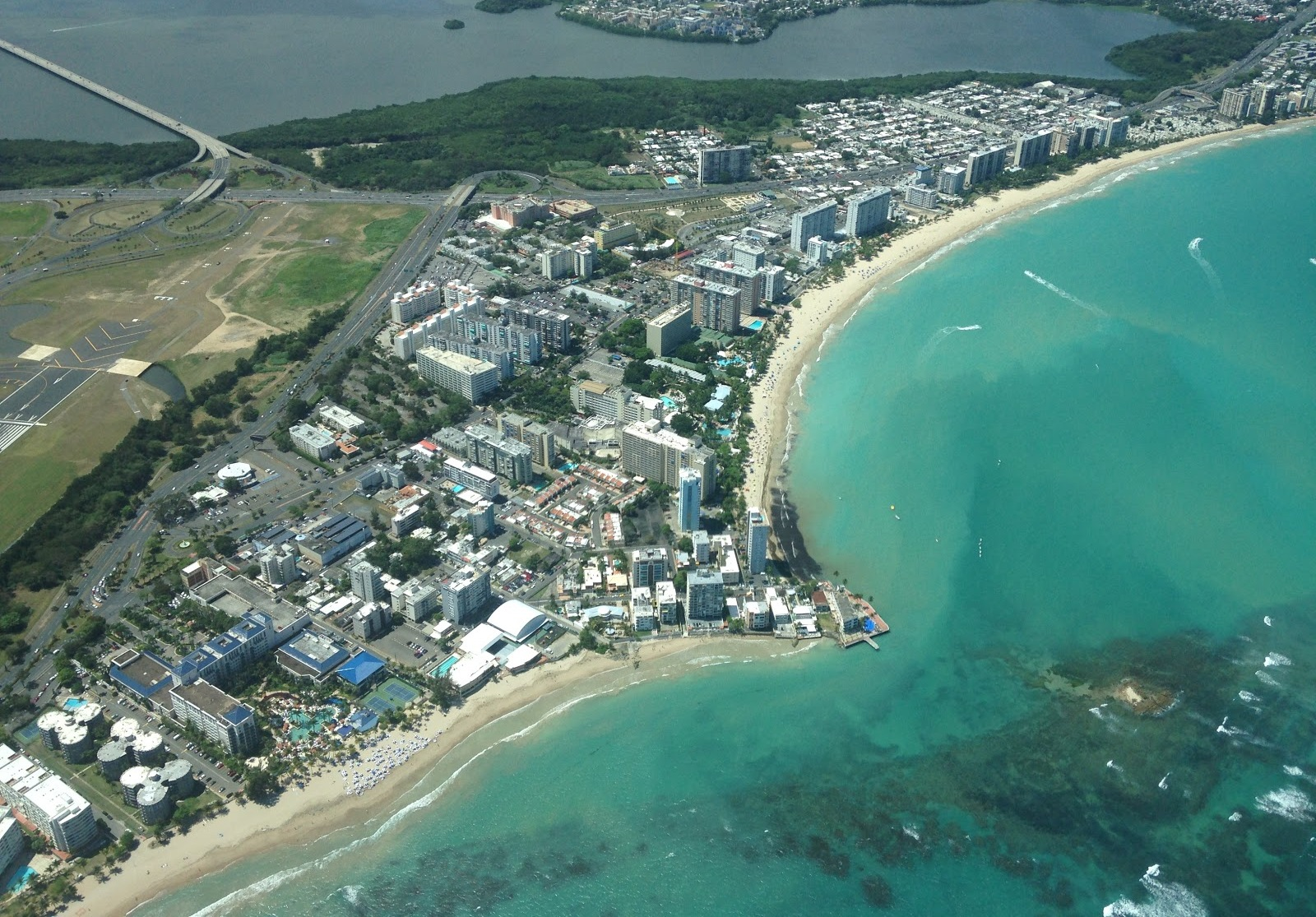
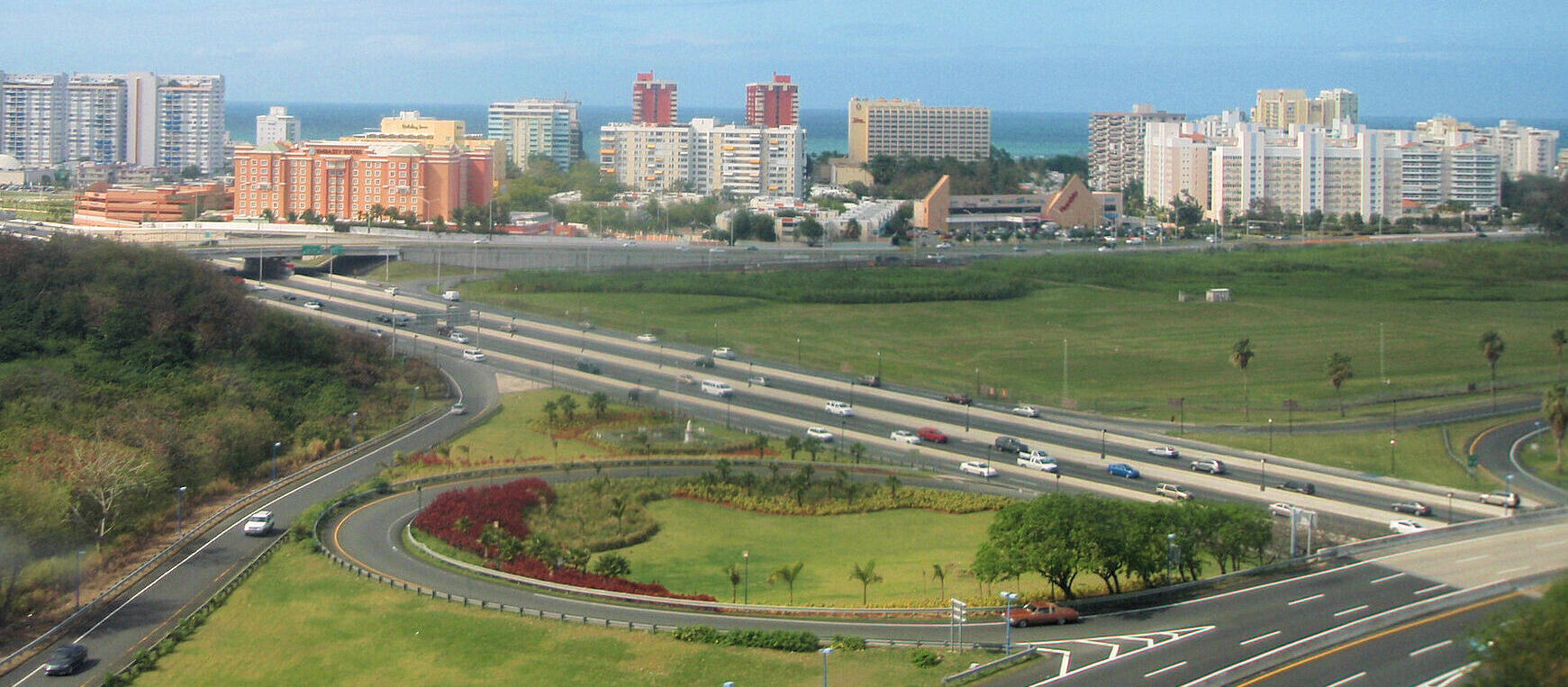
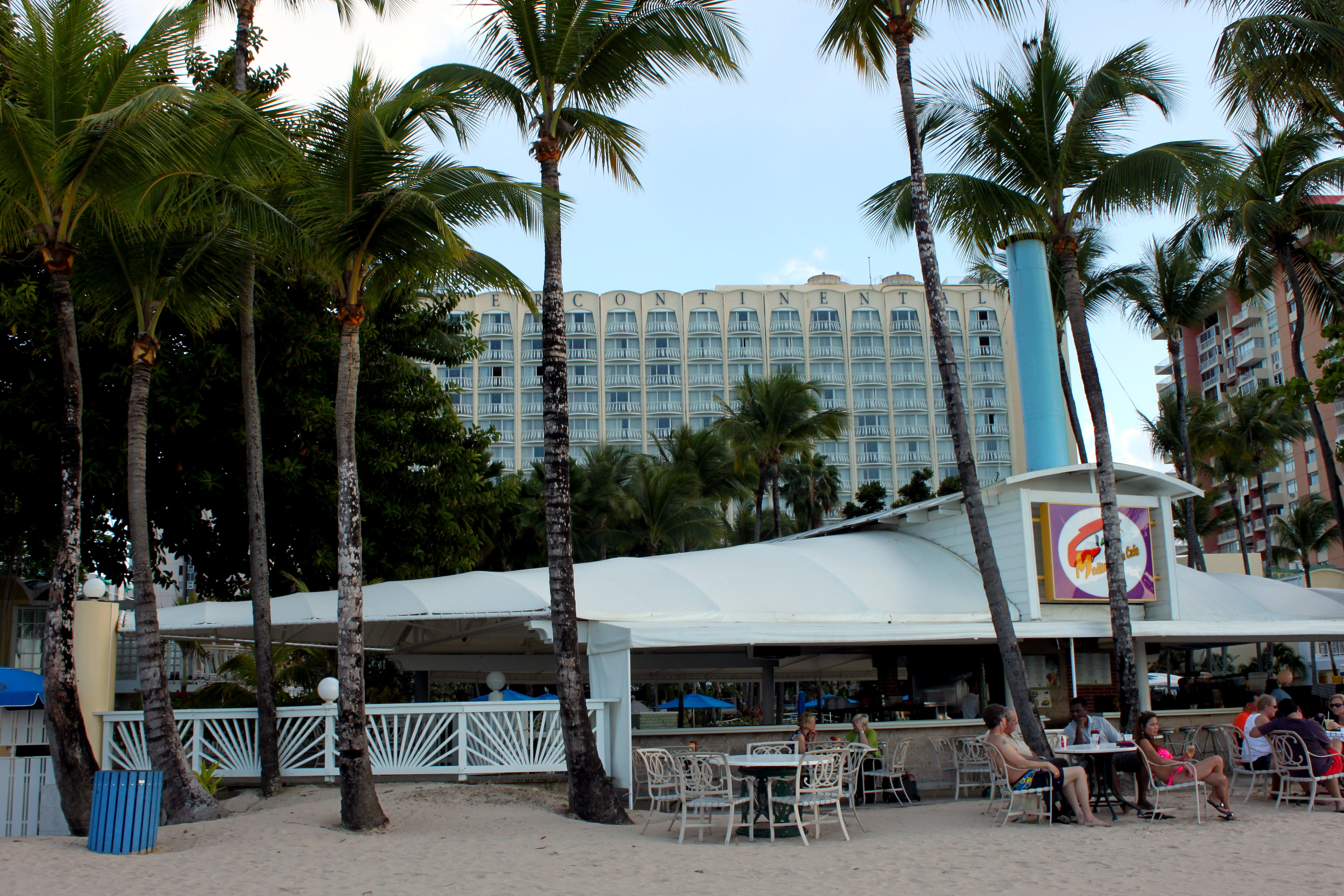
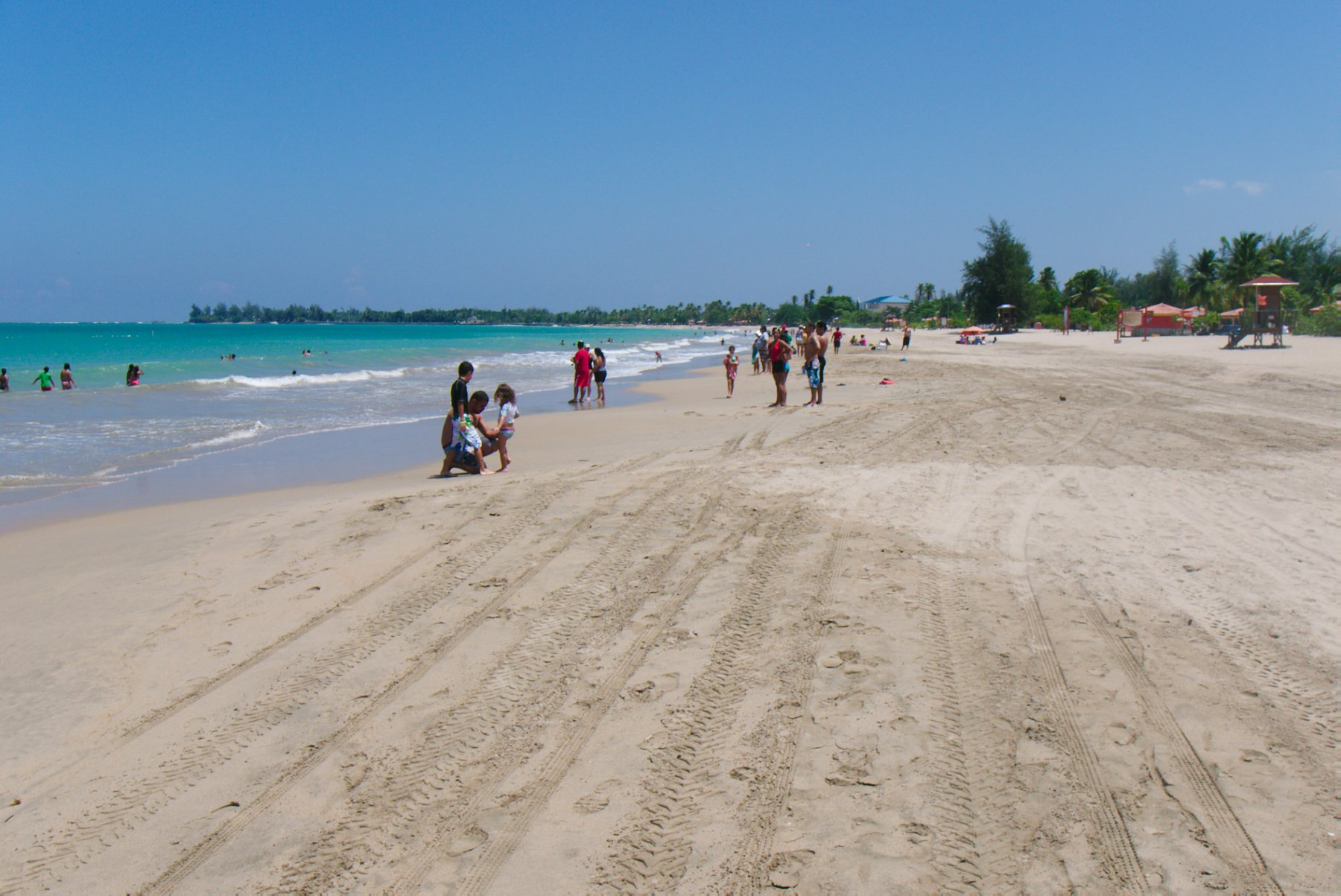
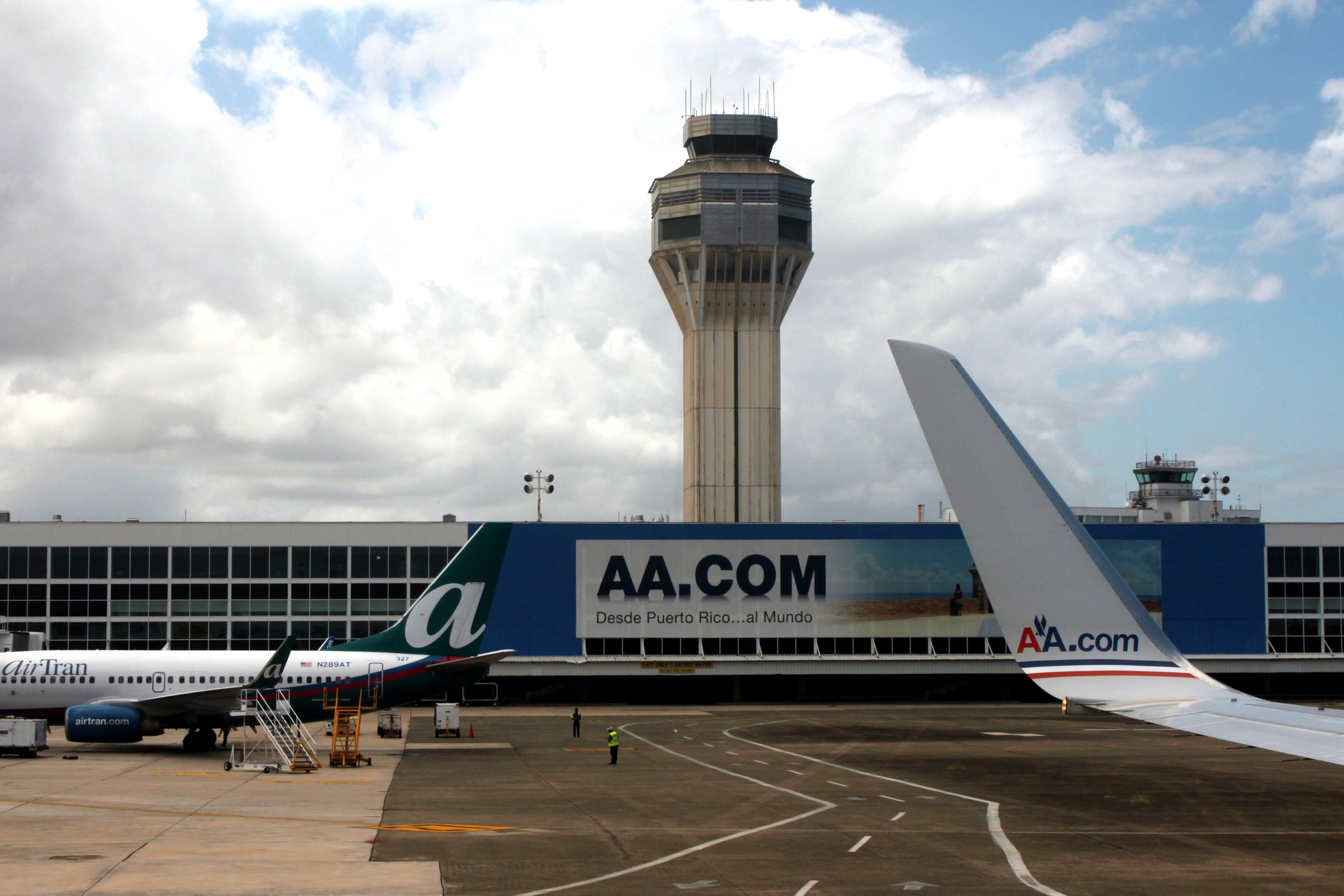
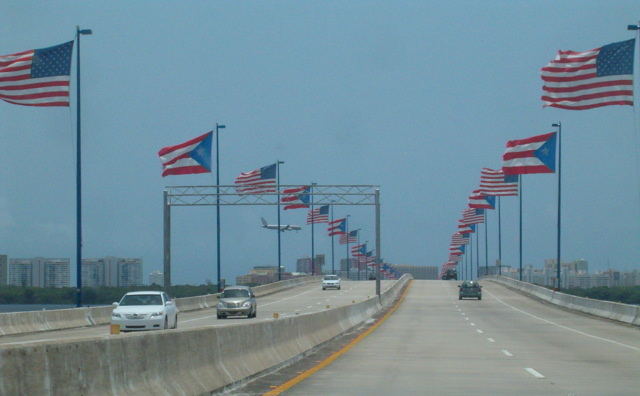
- Isla Verde and Isla Verde Reef Skyline from Teodoro Moscoso Bridge InterContinental Hotel Carolina; Beach Luis Muñoz Marín International Airport Teodoro Moscoso Bridge
- Interactive map of Isla Verde
- Coordinates: 18°26′37″N 66°01′20″W
- Commonwealth: Puerto Rico
- Municipality: Carolina
- Barrio: Cangrejo Arriba

Population (2000)
  - Total: 1,484

Isla Verde (Spanish for ''green island'') is a highly urbanized, beachfront resort, commercial, and residential district with various upscale hotels and condominiums in the municipality of Carolina, where the main airport of Puerto Rico, the Luis Muñoz Marín International Airport, is located. Named after a small cay and reef near the shoreline, Isla Verde is about 3 to 6 miles (4.8 to 9.7 km) east of the Hato Rey business center, Condado resort area, Old San Juan historic quarter, and San Juan Cruise Port in the adjacent capital city and municipality of San Juan, between Los Corozos and San José Lagoons to the west and Torrecilla Lagoon to the east, which lies next to the state forest, beaches, and street food kiosks of the Piñones ("pine nuts") Afro-Puerto Rican community in the municipality of Loíza.

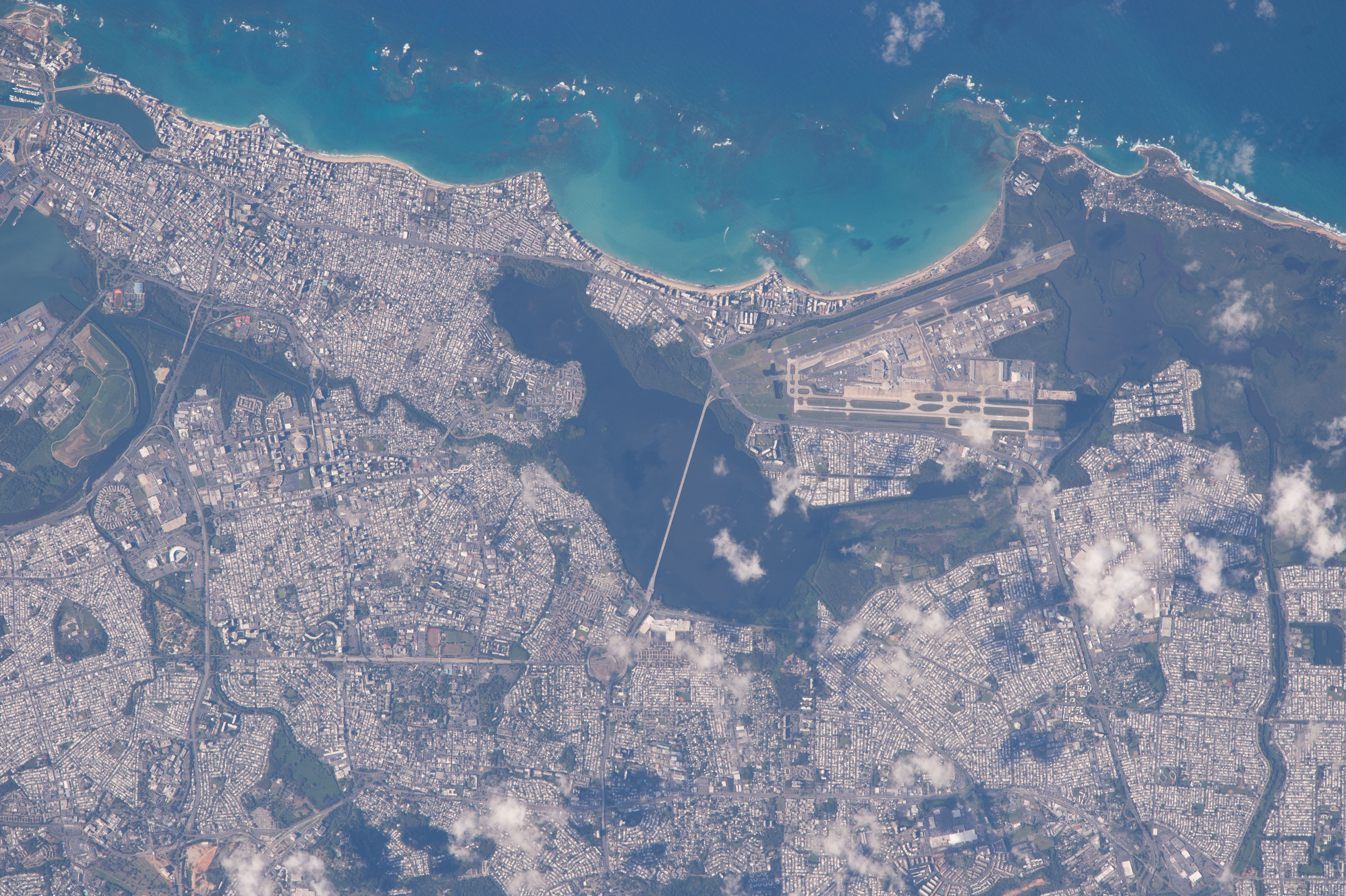
Satellite view from Condado district (upper left) in the San Juan capital municipality to Piñones community (upper right) in the Loíza municipality with Isla Verde area and SJU airport visible (upper left-center) in the Carolina municipality, 2016

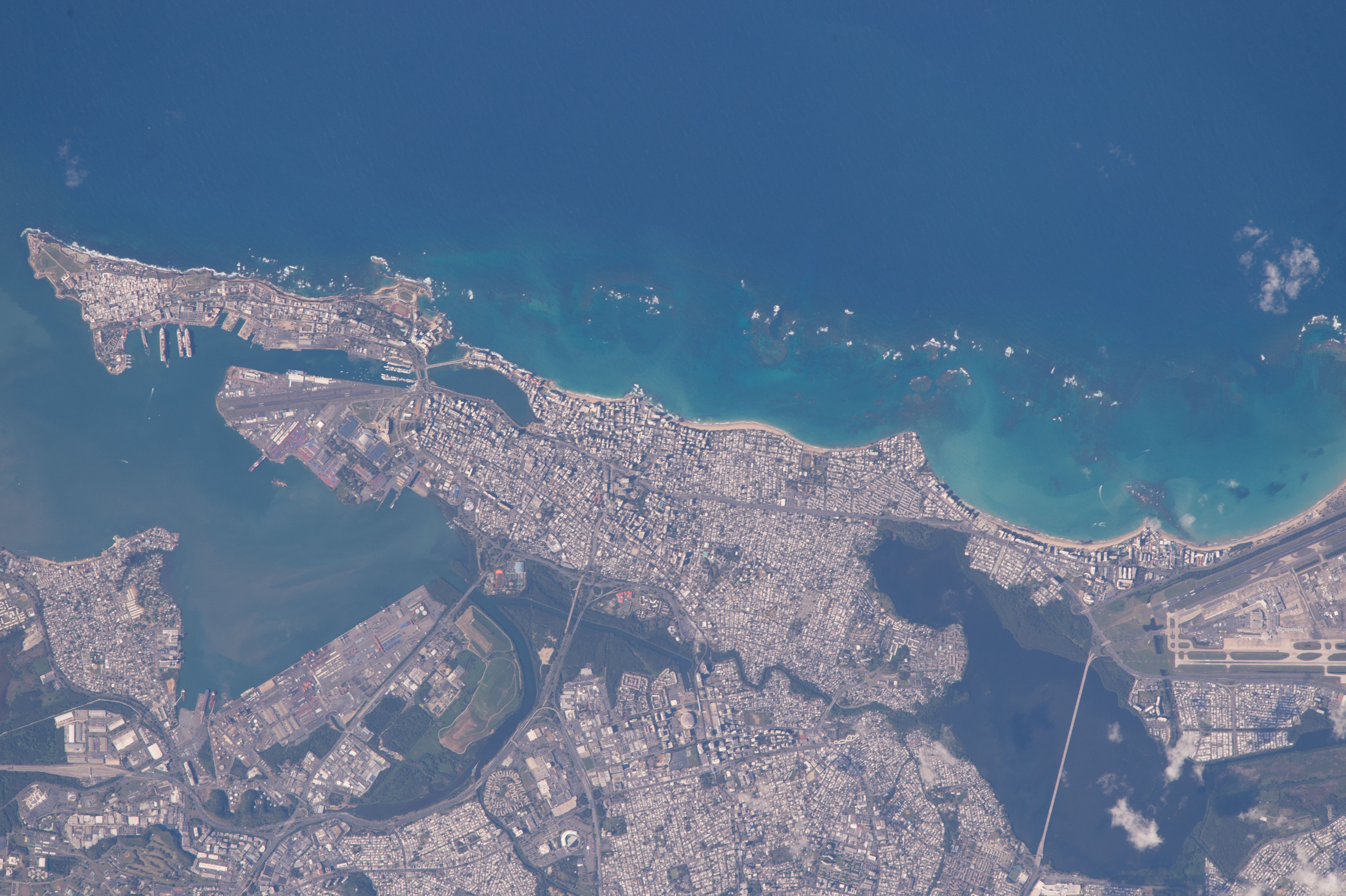
Satellite view from Old San Juan historic quarter (upper left) in San Juan Islet in the San Juan capital municipality to Isla Verde resort area (upper right) in the Carolina municipality, 2016

== Geolocation ==
Isla Verde is named after a small cay surrounded by a coral reef measuring 2,518 m^{2} (0.6 acres) about 400 meters north of the shoreline at Punta del Medio (''middle point'') in the barrio of Cangrejo Arriba in the municipality of Carolina. Isla Verde is bordered to the north by the Atlantic Ocean, to the west by the barrio of Santurce in the capital municipality of San Juan, to the east by the barrio of Torrecilla Baja in the municipality of Loíza, and to the south by the Luis Muñoz Internacional Airport in Carolina. The Teodoro Moscoso Bridge connects Isla Verde to Hato Rey, the financial and commercial center of the main metropolitan area of Puerto Rico. Along with the Condado resort and residential district, it is one of the main tourist areas in the metropolitan area, hosting popular restaurants, hotels, casinos, and resorts.

== Neighborhood entanglements ==
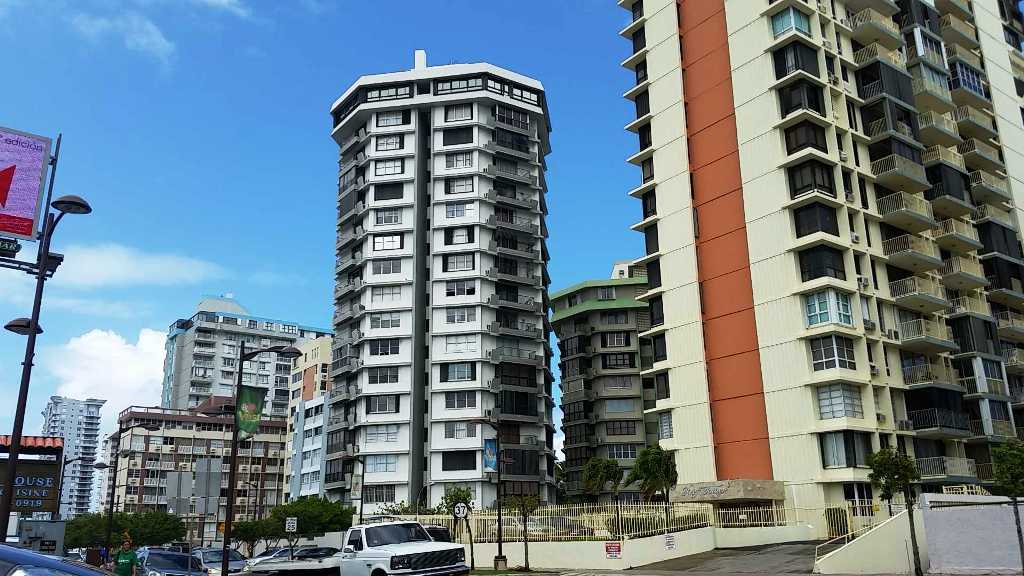
Beachfront condominiums buildings in western Isla Verde, 2015

The Luis Muñoz Marín International Airport, which is often mistakenly thought to be situated in the capital municipality of San Juan, is located in Isla Verde, which is within the limits of the municipality of Carolina. Originally, the airport was given the unofficial title "Isla Verde International Airport", both by locals and visitors. Its residents tend to downplay the fact that the area is technically part of Carolina because Isla Verde shares the coastline with Ocean park and Condado, which are both nearby and part of Santurce, one of the capital's historic districts.

Since the airport's creation and up until the September 11, 2001 attacks, aviation fans could enjoy a day at the beach, and at the same time, watch the aircraft land or take-off at a specially designed spot located near Piñones, Loíza. As a consequence of the attacks, the spot was closed to the general public because it might compromise airport security. Because of the airport's location in the Isla Verde area, some streets have had to be closed several times during visits by dignitaries and celebrities (most notably when a local has had overseas success in a competition). The area has a multitude of restaurants, hotels and high-priced homes as well as hotels and resorts.

Many celebrities have lived in Isla Verde's affluent areas, including some former members of the boy band Menudo, including Ricky Martin. During the late 1970s and early 1980s, it was home to one of the world's more popular discos of the time: The Flying Sauce, owned by Charlie Garcia who had promoted the Muhammad Ali vs. Jean Pierre Coopman fight at the Roberto Clemente Coliseum. The Flying Saucer had a capacity of 800 people and over 10,000 were left outside opening night as DJ Orlando Torres del Pino had to force himself into the club. Isla Verde is home to a large Cuban exile community centered on Casa Cuba, which is Puerto Rico's main Cuban social club.

=== Public Transportation ===
The T5, 21 and 53 buses pass between Old San Juan, Condado and Isla Verde.

The Isla Verde bus terminal has routes to various other parts of San Juan:

- 50 to Luis Muñoz Marín Airport
- 45 to Luis Muñoz Marín Airport and Piñero
- 40 to Piñero
- 5 to Santurce and Old San Juan
- 53 to Condado and Old San Juan

There are two bus systems serving the Isla Verde bus terminal: AMA, the main public transportation system and SITRAC which travels in the Isla Verde Hotel district. The public bus 5 and 53 which will take you from the Bus Terminal to Old San Juan (e.g. to El Morro) in roughly 1 hour. The SITRAC bus is free but only stays in Isla Verde. The public bus costs 75 cents to ride.

Available at all times, taxis charge about $20 for a ride to the Condado and Old San Juan areas.

== Subareas ==
Isla Verde is near the largest public housing project in Puerto Rico, the Luis Llorens Torres Residential Complex, which is within the limits of the municipality of San Juan. In March 2021, a higher police presence was planned for Isla Verde.

== See also ==
- Piñones State Forest
- List of communities in Puerto Rico
