= Las Casas (Santurce) =

Subbarrio of Santurce in San Juan, Puerto Rico

Coordinates: 18°25′57″N 66°02′25″W

- Subbarrio
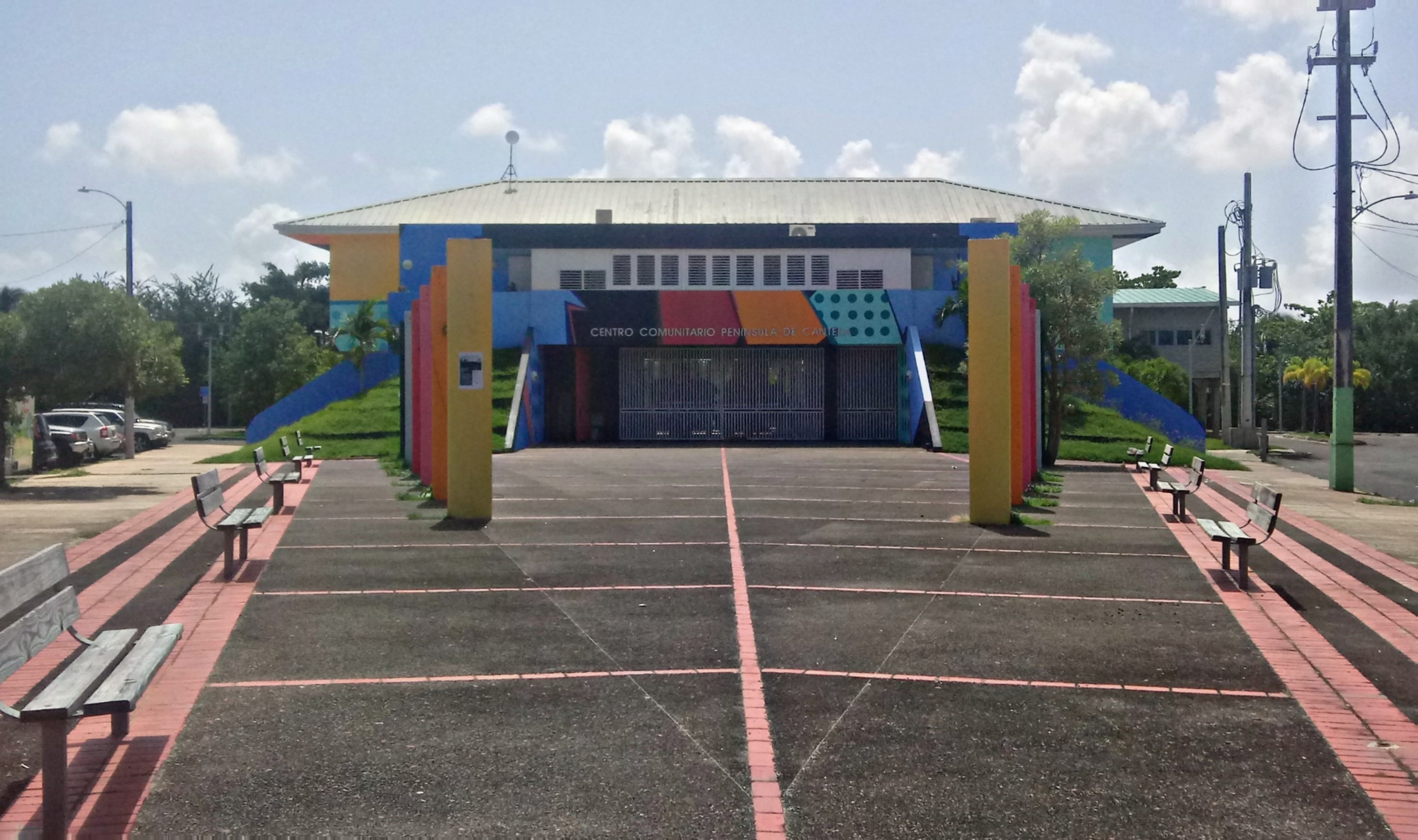
- Península de Cantera Community Center in Las Casas

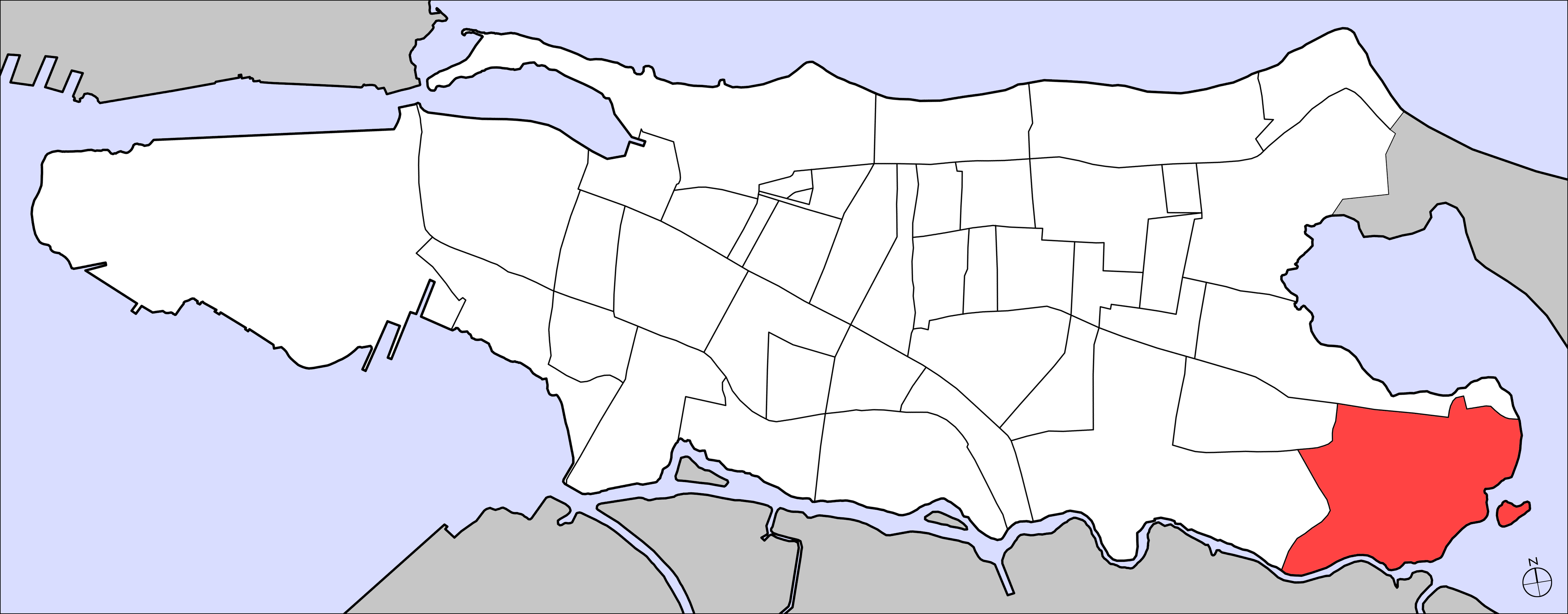
- Las Casas subbarrio within Santurce barrio
- Commonwealth: Puerto Rico
- Municipality: San Juan
- Barrio: Santurce

Area
  - Total: .45 sq mi (1.2 km^{2})
  - Land: .31 sq mi (0.80 km^{2})
  - Water: .14 sq mi (0.36 km^{2})
- Elevation: 10 ft (3.0 m)

Population (2010)
  - Total: 6,399
  - Density: 20,641.9/sq mi (7,969.9/km^{2})
- Source: 2010 Census
- Time zone: UTC−4 (AST)

Las Casas is one of the forty subbarrios of Santurce, San Juan, Puerto Rico.

== Demographics ==
In 1940, Las Casas had a population of 428.

In 2010, Las Casas had a population of 6,399 and a population density of 20,641.9 persons per square mile.

== Features ==
Centro Comunitario Península de Cantera is a community and recreational center located in Las Casas.

== Camp Las Casas US Army installation ==
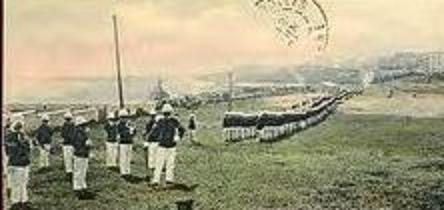
Regiment training in 1904 in Las Casas

The area of "Las Casas" was also where the United States Army established Camp Las Casas, a military installation established in 1904. The camp was the main training base of the "Porto Rico Regiment of Infantry". On January 15, 1899, the military government changed the name of Puerto Rico to Porto Rico. (On May 17, 1932, U.S. Congress changed the name back to "Puerto Rico"). The Porto Rico Regiment of Infantry was a U.S. Army Regiment which was later renamed the "65th Infantry Regiment". The base continued in operation until 1946, when it was finally closed and the Residencial Las Casas was built in its place.

== Location ==
Las Casas is surrounded by two bodies of water, San José Lagoon on the east, and Los Corozos Lagoon on the north. There's also a small islet on the east, Guachinanga Island. To the north of Las Casas is Barrio Obrero.

== See also ==
- List of communities in Puerto Rico
