= List of islands of Puerto Rico =

Islands, cays, islets and atolls of Puerto Rico

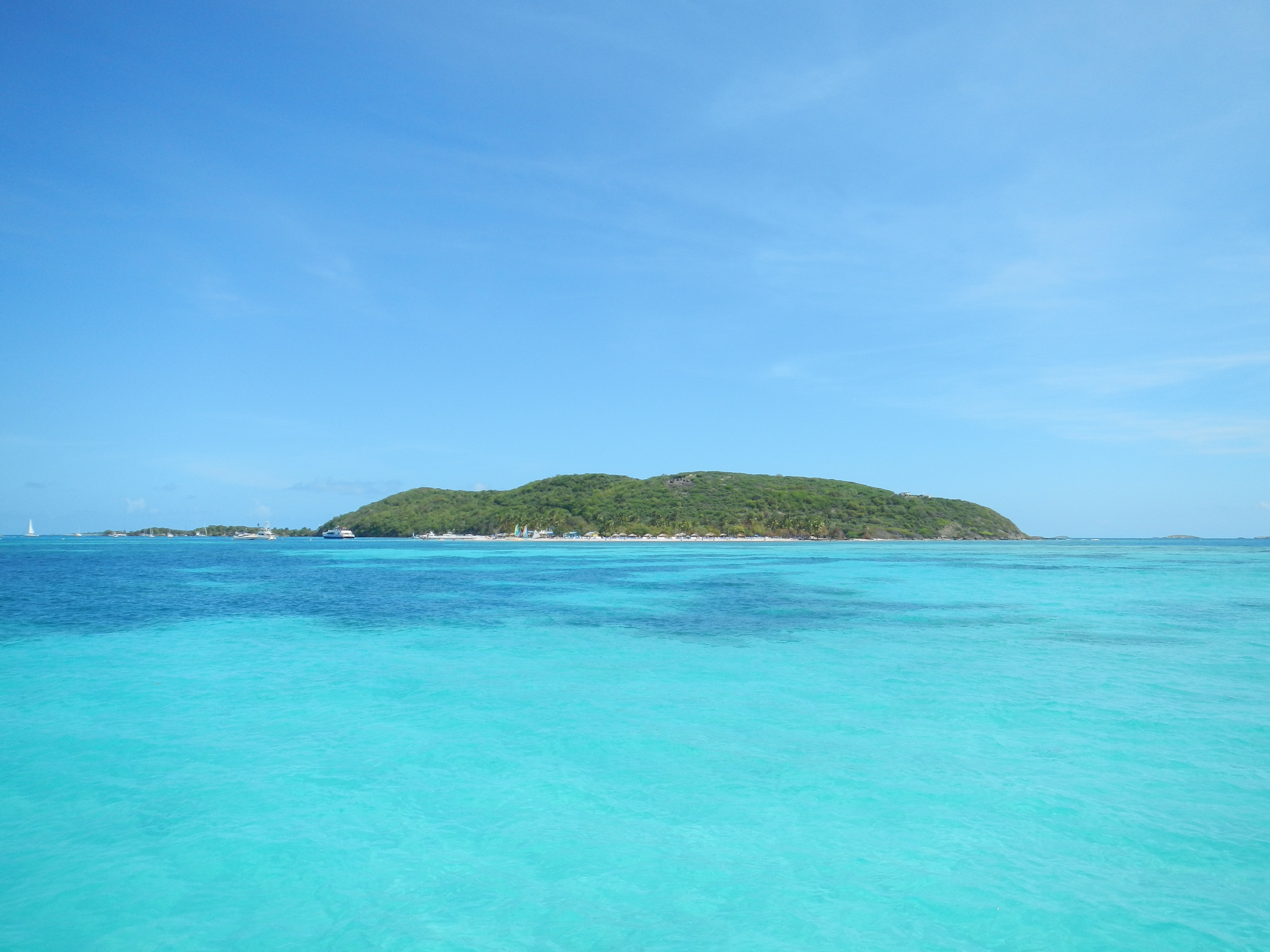
Isla Palomino

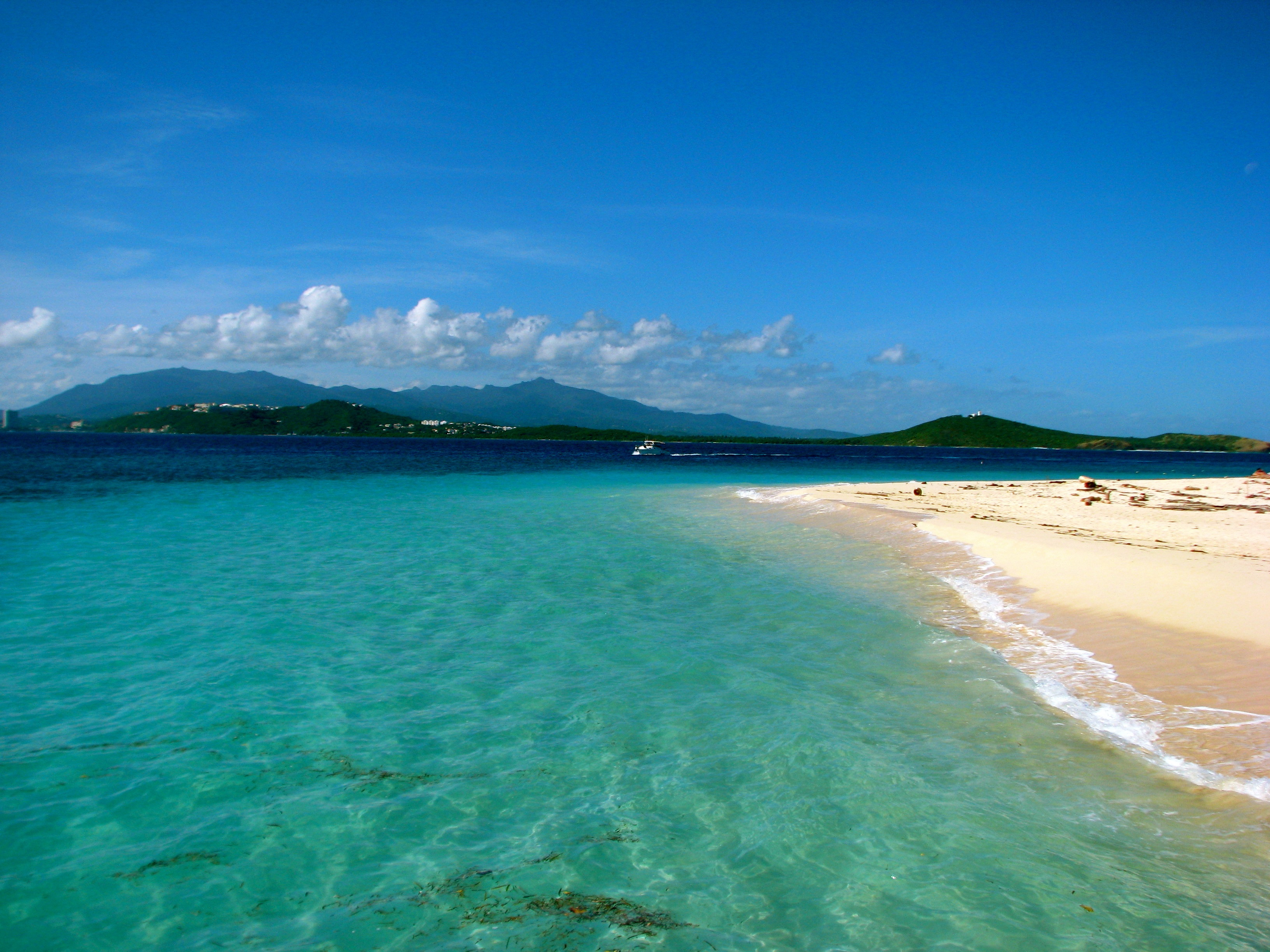
Cayo Icacos

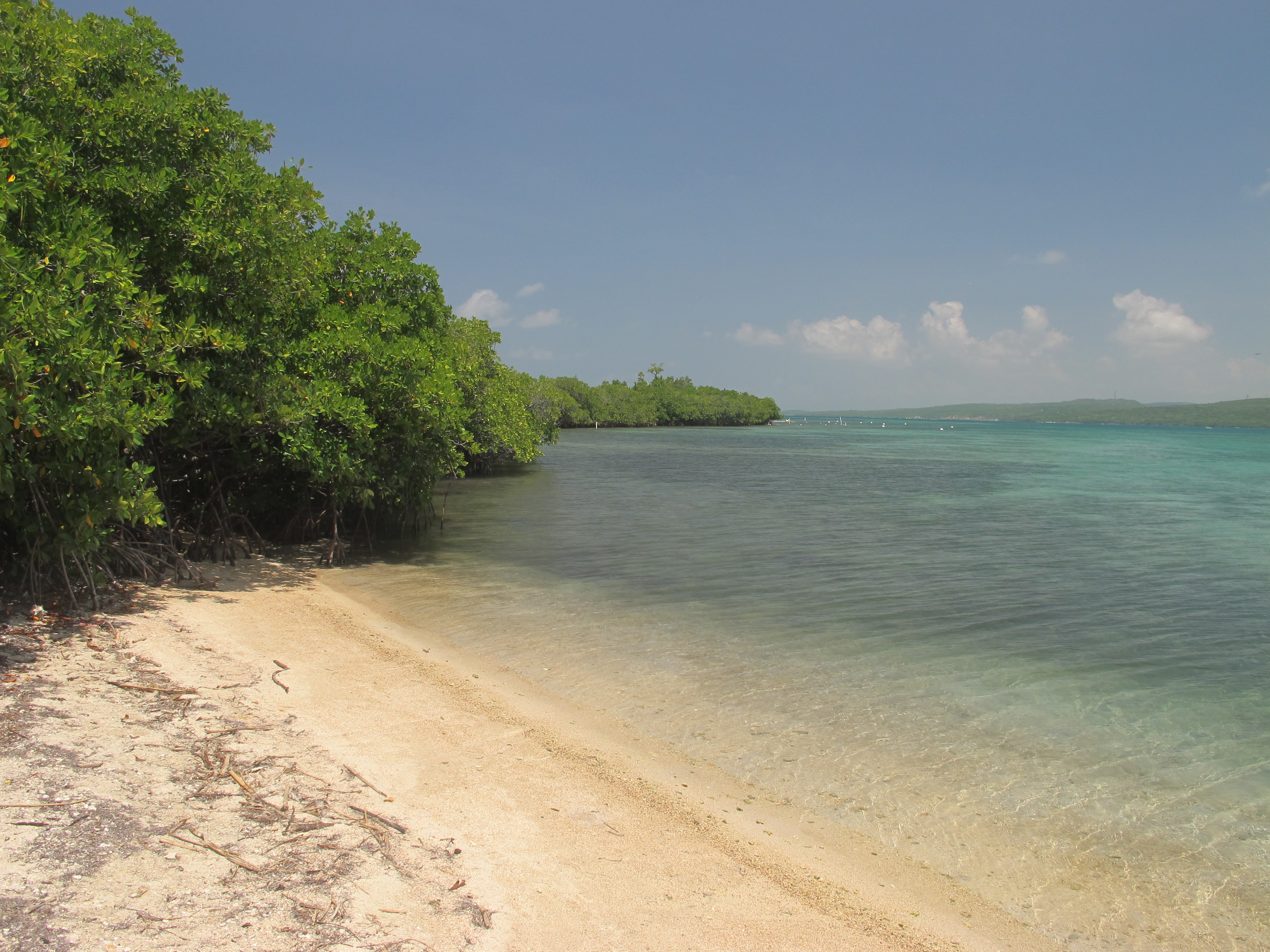
Cayo Aurora

This is a list of islands of Puerto Rico.

The Commonwealth of Puerto Rico has over 143 islands, keys, and islets. Only the main island of Puerto Rico (3,424 sq mi [8,870 km^{2}]), and the islands of Vieques (51 sq mi [130 km^{2}]), and Culebra (10 sq mi [26 km^{2}]) are inhabited. Mona Island (22 sq mi [57 km^{2}]) has personnel from the Puerto Rico Department of Natural and Environmental Resources (DNER) stationed year-around but no private citizens inhabit it (other than overnight camping guests and nature enthusiasts). Caja de Muertos Island (0.58 sq mi [1.5 km^{2}]) is also a DNER Nature Reserve, while Desecheo Island (0.58 sq mi [1.5 km^{2}]) is a National Wildlife Refuge administrated by the US Fish and Wildlife Service.

The other 137 islands, keys, and islets are not inhabited. Some islands are privately-owned: Isla Palomino, which is rented on a long-term lease to El Conquistador Hotel, Isleta Marina, Isla de Ramos and Isla de Lobos.

== Table ==
Island Name	GNIS ID	Coordinates	Municipality	Ele(ft)
Alcarraza	1609495	18°21′40″N 65°22′09″W	Culebra	69
Bajo Evelyn	1612972	18°09′05″N 65°44′28″W	Naguabo	0
Cabeza de Perro	1613398	18°14′54″N 65°34′39″W	Ceiba	0
Cabeza de Perro	1609661	18°14′53″N 65°34′41″W	Ceiba	0
Cabezo de Perro	1990733	18°14′55″N 65°34′42″W	Ceiba	0
Cayo Ahogado	1609807	18°19′21″N 65°37′10″W	Fajardo	0
Cayo Alfeñique	1613030	17°55′37″N 66°21′07″W	Santa Isabel	0
Cayo Algodones	1609808	18°11′34″N 65°41′01″W	Naguabo	0
Cayo Arenas	1609809	17°57′35″N 66°40′27″W	Ponce	0
Cayo Ballena	1613031	18°20′51″N 65°14′13″W	Culebra	0
Cayo Batata	1609810	18°06′56″N 65°46′17″W	Humacao	0
Cayo Bayo	1609811	17°58′17″N 67°03′40″W	Lajas	3
Cayo Berbería	1609812	17°55′43″N 66°27′25″W	Juana Díaz	10
Cayo Botella	1613032	18°19′30″N 65°14′27″W	Culebra	33
Cayo Botijuela	2575431	18°22′25″N 65°22′37″W	Culebra	0
Cayo Cabritas	1609813	18°13′15″N 65°36′06″W	Ceiba	0
Cayo Caracoles	1609814	17°57′36″N 67°02′18″W	Lajas	20
Cayo Caribe	1609815	17°58′12″N 66°43′58″W	Peñuelas	0
Cayo Chiva	1612887	18°06′21″N 65°24′58″W	Vieques	0
Cayo Collado	1609816	17°57′45″N 67°02′08″W	Lajas	0
Cayo Conejo	2575421	18°07′27″N 65°18′30″W	—	0
Cayo Corral	1613034	17°56′09″N 67°01′10″W	Lajas	0
Cayo Desgraciado	2575420	17°57′57″N 66°33′56″W	Ponce	0
Cayo Diablo	1609817	18°21′45″N 65°31′53″W	Fajardo	20
Cayo Don Luis	1609818	17°56′38″N 66°58′18″W	Guánica	23
Cayo Enrique	1609819	17°57′12″N 67°02′48″W	Lajas	7
Cayo Fanduca	1613035	18°05′13″N 67°12′54″W	Cabo Rojo	0
Cayo Icacos	1613037	18°23′11″N 65°35′20″W	Fajardo	23
Cayo Jalova	1609820	18°07′07″N 65°21′32″W	Vieques	0
Cayo Jalovita	1609821	18°06′57″N 65°21′17″W	Vieques	0
Cayo Largo	1609822	18°18′55″N 65°34′43″W	Fajardo	0
Cayo Lobito	1613038	18°20′03″N 65°23′34″W	Culebra	30
Cayo Lobo	1613039	18°19′28″N 65°22′39″W	Culebra	56
Cayo Lobos	1609823	18°22′39″N 65°34′12″W	Fajardo	13
Cayo María Langa	1613040	17°57′56″N 66°45′01″W	Guayanilla	0
Cayo Mata	1609825	17°59′21″N 66°45′49″W	Guayanilla	0
Cayo Mata	1609824	17°57′11″N 66°17′40″W	Salinas	0
Cayo Mata Seca	1613041	17°57′40″N 67°00′34″W	Lajas	10
Cayo Matias			Salinas	10
Cayo Matojo	1613042	18°20′11″N 65°17′24″W	Culebra	20
Cayo Morrillo	1609826	17°55′37″N 66°16′23″W	Salinas	0
Cayo Norte	1613043	18°20′13″N 65°15′24″W	Culebra	131
Cayo Obispo			Fajardo	
Cayo Palomas	1609827	17°58′29″N 66°44′56″W	Peñuelas	0
Cayo Parguera	1609828	17°58′43″N 66°43′03″W	Peñuelas	0
Cayo Pirata	1613044	18°18′23″N 65°17′44″W	Culebra	3
Cayo Piñerito	1609829	18°14′42″N 65°35′41″W	Ceiba	0
Cayo Puerca	1613045	17°55′46″N 66°14′13″W	Salinas	0
Cayo Ratones	1609831	18°22′57″N 65°34′49″W	Fajardo	26
Cayo Ratones	1609830	18°07′01″N 67°11′18″W	Cabo Rojo	0
Cayo Ratón	1613046	18°18′51″N 65°21′12″W	Culebra	13
Cayo Real	1613027	18°05′19″N 65°28′22″W	Vieques	49
Cayo Río	1613048	17°58′57″N 66°44′17″W	Peñuelas	0
Cayo Santiago	1609832	18°09′23″N 65°44′03″W	Humacao	39
Cayo Sombrerito	1613049	18°20′16″N 65°14′44″W	Culebra	26
Cayo Terremoto	1612960	17°55′48″N 66°58′21″W	Guánica	7
Cayo Tiburón	1613050	18°20′42″N 65°14′17″W	Culebra	0
Cayo Tuna	2575419	18°20′15″N 65°23′35″W	Culebra	0
Cayo Verde	1613051	18°18′25″N 65°17′26″W	Culebra	0
Cayo Vieques	1609833	17°57′51″N 67°04′15″W	Lajas	0
Cayo Yerba	1613052	18°19′08″N 65°21′14″W	Culebra	46
Cayo de Luis Peña	1613028	18°18′23″N 65°19′59″W	Culebra	361
Cayo de Tierra	1612886	18°05′20″N 65°28′02″W	Vieques	66
Cayo del Agua	1992542	18°18′40″N 65°20′51″W	Culebra	13
Cayo del Agua	1613029	18°18′43″N 65°20′52″W	Culebra	13
Cayos Cabezazos	1613054	17°55′18″N 66°22′59″W	Santa Isabel	10
Cayos Caribes	1613055	17°55′38″N 66°12′44″W	Guayama	0
Cayos Geniquí	1613057	18°20′18″N 65°13′54″W	Culebra	16
Cayos de Barca	1609834	17°54′59″N 66°14′23″W	Salinas	0
Cayos de Caracoles	1613053	17°55′42″N 66°21′59″W	Santa Isabel	0
Cayos de Caña Gorda	1609835	17°56′32″N 66°52′17″W	Guánica	0
Cayos de Pájaros	1609836	17°55′24″N 66°15′40″W	Salinas	0
Cayos de Ratones	1609837	17°56′06″N 66°17′34″W	Salinas	0
El Ancón	1613383	18°21′06″N 65°20′35″W	Culebra	23
El Mono	1610244	18°19′04″N 65°22′06″W	Culebra	0
Gata Islets	2575433	17°58′00″N 66°37′00″W	Ponce	0
Cayo Aurora (Gilligans Island)	1992706	17°56′33″N 66°52′16″W	Guánica	0
Isla Ballena	1991536	17°56′41″N 66°52′01″W	Guánica	0
Isla Cabras	1611178	18°12′44″N 65°36′09″W	Ceiba	0
Isla Caja de Muertos	1611179	17°53′41″N 66°31′12″W	Ponce	144
Isla Chiva	1612909	18°06′26″N 65°23′03″W	Vieques	0
Isla Cueva	1611180	17°57′44″N 67°04′49″W	Lajas	20
Isla Culebrita	1611181	18°18′53″N 65°13′44″W	Culebra	121
Isla Desecheo	2575416	18°23′20″N 67°28′30″W	Mayagüez	0
Isla Guachinanga	1611183	18°25′48″N 66°02′08″W	San Juan	0
Isla Guayacán	1611184	17°57′27″N 67°05′25″W	Lajas	23
Isla La Cancora	1611185	18°27′57″N 65°59′51″W	Loíza	0
Isla Magueyes	1611186	17°58′08″N 67°02′39″W	Lajas	62
Isla Mata la Gata		17°57′36.0″N 67°02′17.7″W	Lajas	0
Isla Matei	1611187	17°58′04″N 67°00′28″W	Lajas	49
Isla Monito	1613131	18°09′41″N 67°56′59″W	Mayagüez	0
Isla Morrillito	1611189	17°52′56″N 66°32′00″W	Ponce	33
Isla Palominitos	1611190	18°20′20″N 65°34′02″W	Fajardo	0
Isla Palominos	1611191	18°20′55″N 65°34′05″W	Fajardo	121
Isla Piedra	1611192	18°27′53″N 66°02′42″W	San Juan	0
Isla Piñeros	1613132	18°15′08″N 65°35′29″W	Ceiba	0
Isla Puerca	1611193	17°57′33″N 66°21′48″W	Santa Isabel	0
Isla San Juan	1613356	18°27′58″N 66°06′14″W	San Juan	26
Isla Verde	1611194	18°26′53″N 66°01′00″W	Carolina	0
Isla Yallis	1612911	18°08′53″N 65°18′33″W	Vieques	0
Isla de Cabras	1611175	18°28′15″N 66°08′11″W	Toa Baja	10
Isla de Cardona	1613033	17°57′26″N 66°38′06″W	Ponce	0
Isla de Cerro Gordo	1611176	18°29′11″N 66°20′56″W	Vega Alta	0
Isla de Culebra	1611182	18°18′53″N 65°16′59″W	Culebra	213
Isla de Jueyes	2575428	17°57′40″N 66°35′24″W	Ponce	0
Isla de Mona	1611188	18°04′53″N 67°53′29″W	Mayagüez	200
Isla de Ramos	1611177	18°18′46″N 65°36′35″W	Fajardo	26
Isla de Ratones	1613047	17°57′11″N 66°40′52″W	Ponce	0
Isla de Vieques	1612910	18°07′23″N 65°24′59″W	Vieques	79
Isla de las Palomas	1611174	18°28′34″N 66°11′19″W	Toa Baja	43
Isla del Frío	1613056	17°57′44″N 66°33′19″W	Ponce	0
Island of Puerto Rico	1848460	18°14′58″N 66°30′04″W	Orocovis	1283
Isla Guachinanga			San Juan	
Isleta Marina	2575427	18°20′23″N 65°37′05″W	Fajardo	0
Isleta de San Juan	1991538	18°27′51″N 66°05′51″W	San Juan	10
Isletas de Garzas	1611196	18°29′23″N 66°22′29″W	Vega Baja	0
Islote Número dos	1613133	18°26′28″N 65°58′42″W	Carolina	0
Islote de Juan Pérez	1611198	18°26′10″N 65°56′04″W	Loíza	10
La Blanquilla	1611235	18°22′16″N 65°33′14″W	Fajardo	26
La Cordillera	1611243	18°22′53″N 65°33′59″W	Fajardo	0
Las Cabritas	1611352	18°28′24″N 66°08′04″W	Toa Baja	3
Las Cucarachas	1611365	18°24′02″N 65°36′42″W	Fajardo	23
Las Hermanas	1611370	18°18′53″N 65°21′09″W	Culebra	16
Las Lavanderas	2575426	18°16′00″N 65°33′00″W	—	0
Las Lavanderas del Este	1611371	18°15′55″N 65°32′23″W	Ceiba	0
Las Lavanderas del Oeste	1611372	18°15′43″N 65°33′33″W	Ceiba	0
Los Farallones	1611428	18°23′53″N 65°35′54″W	Fajardo	20
Los Gemelos	1611429	18°21′31″N 65°21′42″W	Culebra	23
Los Negritos	1611437	18°29′36″N 66°36′17″W	Arecibo	0
Mata Redonda	1611489	17°57′03″N 66°12′22″W	Guayama	0
Pelaíta	1613156	18°17′58″N 65°15′09″W	Culebra	0
Pelá	1613155	18°17′51″N 65°15′01″W	Culebra	13
Peñon Brusi	1611647	18°29′33″N 66°51′18″W	Camuy	23
Peñon de Afuera	1611645	18°29′34″N 66°52′10″W	Camuy	23
Peñon de San Jorge	1611646	18°28′11″N 66°05′29″W	San Juan	10
Piedra Stevens	1613163	18°21′31″N 65°20′51″W	Culebra	10
Piedra del Norte	1613162	18°19′15″N 65°13′24″W	Culebra	164
Piragua de Adentro	1611675	18°16′06″N 65°31′53″W	Ceiba	0
Piragua de Afuera	1613390	18°16′22″N 65°30′32″W	Ceiba	0
Piragua de Afuera	1611676	18°16′22″N 65°30′33″W	Ceiba	0
Punta Larga	1611824	18°26′50″N 65°58′55″W	Loíza	0
Punta Mosquitos	1611840	18°26′41″N 65°58′33″W	Loíza	0
Roca Alcatraz	1612949	18°07′24″N 65°18′04″W	Vieques	0
Roca Cocinera	1612633	18°28′48″N 66°42′14″W	Arecibo	0
Roca Cucaracha	1612950	18°09′17″N 65°19′22″W	Vieques	0
Roca Culumna	1613382	18°19′58″N 65°23′31″W	Culebra	10
Roca Ola	1612636	17°56′51″N 67°10′56″W	Cabo Rojo	0
Roca Resuello	1612637	18°28′42″N 66°43′06″W	Arecibo	0
Roca Speck	1613369	18°19′35″N 65°15′50″W	Culebra	0
Roca Velásquez	1612638	18°01′24″N 67°10′40″W	Cabo Rojo	0
Tres Hermanas	1612790	18°29′28″N 66°34′28″W	Barceloneta	0
Tres Hermanos	1612791	18°28′54″N 66°42′12″W	Arecibo	0

== See also ==
- List of communities in Puerto Rico
- List of Caribbean islands#Puerto Rico
