= Air Caribbean Flight 309 =

Fatal 1978 airliner crash in Barrio Obrero, Puerto Rico

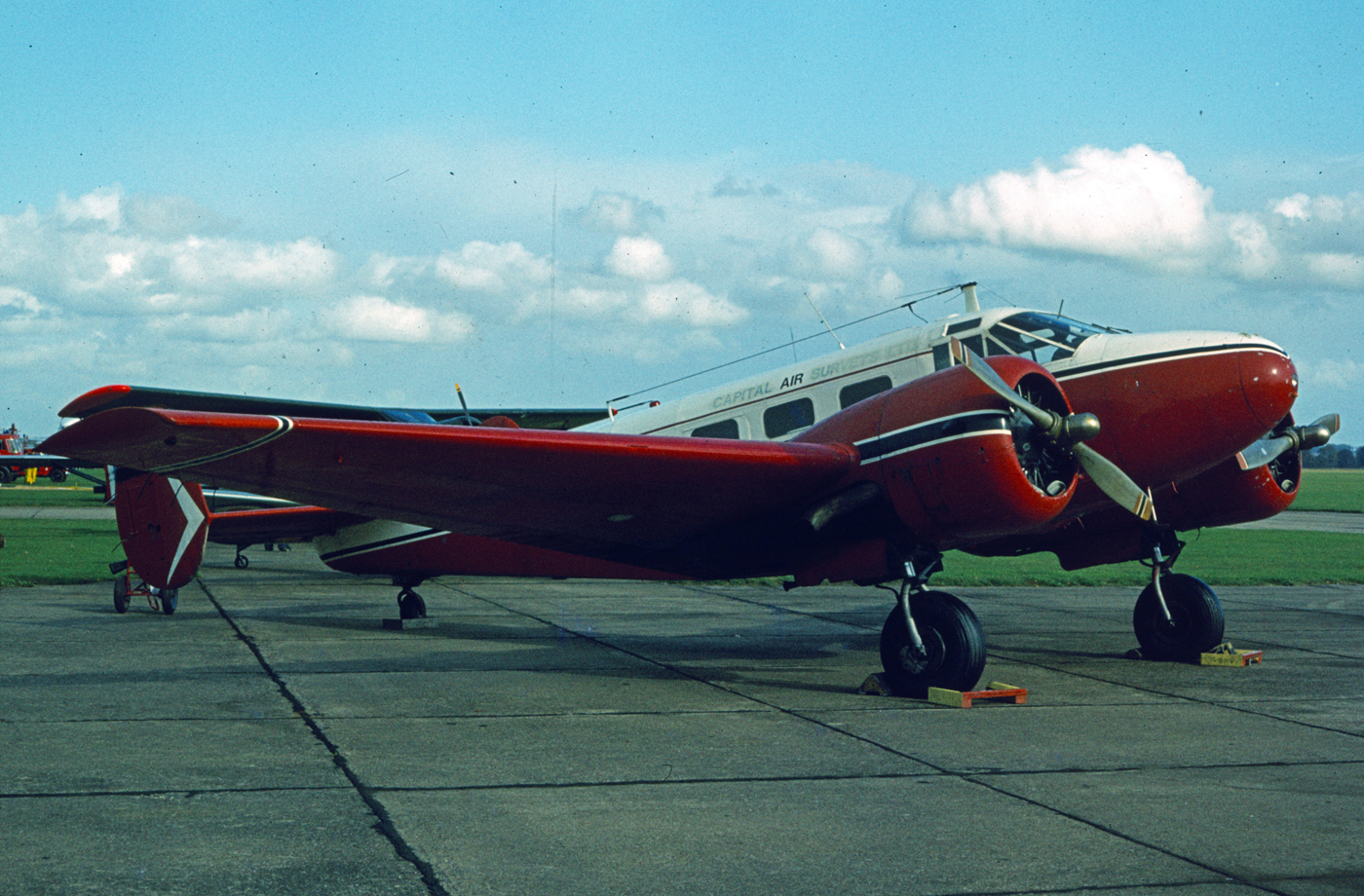
- A Beechcraft D18S, similar to the one involved

Accident
- Date: September 26, 1978
- Summary: Crashed into a populated bar, caused by wake turbulence from an L-1011 jet
- Site: Barrio Obrero in Santurce, San Juan, Puerto Rico; 18.440°N 66.012°W

Aircraft
- Aircraft type: Beechcraft Model 18
- Operator: Air Caribbean
- Registration: N500L
- Flight origin: Ramey Air Base, Aguadilla
- Destination: Isla Verde International Airport, San Juan
- Passengers: 5
- Crew: 1
- Fatalities: 6
- Injuries: 0
- Survivors: 0

Ground casualties
- Ground injuries: Several

Air Caribbean Flight 309 was a domestic, non-scheduled airline flight by Puerto Rican airline Air Caribbean, which on Tuesday, September 26, 1978, crashed as it was preparing to land at Luis Muñoz Marín International Airport (then known, unofficially, as Isla Verde International Airport) in San Juan, after a flight from Ramey Air Force Base (what is now known as Rafael Hernandez Airport) in Aguadilla, killing all six occupants of the aircraft and injuring several customers of a Barrio Obrero bar into which the airplane fell.

== Flight ==
Air Caribbean flight 309 took off from Aguadilla airport and had an uneventful flight for about 25 minutes before it got to San Juan. The flight that day was being carried out on a Beechcraft D18S, which was owned by Puerto Rican businessman and pilot Francisco Cruz, who sometimes leased this airplane, registered as N-500L, to Air Caribbean. N-500L was a small propeller airplane, with a capacity for 10 passengers; on the day of the crash, it was carrying five passengers and a crew member, pilot Jerry Cannon.

== Happenings outside the Air Caribbean airplane ==
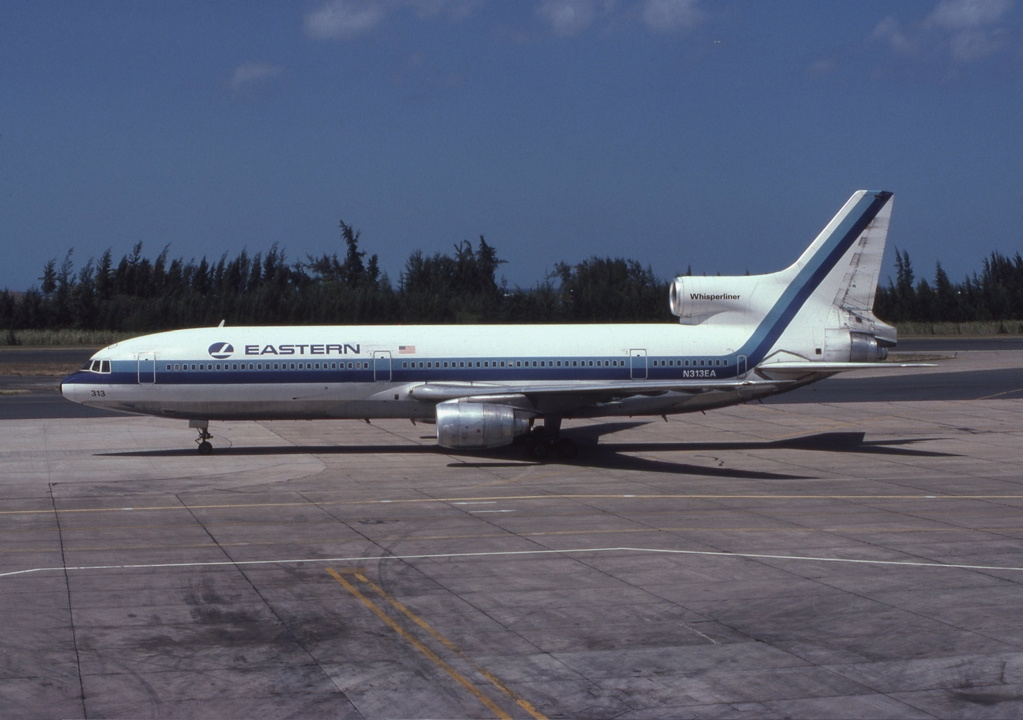
A Lockheed L-1011 TriStar of Eastern Air Lines, similar to the one involved as Flight 75

At about the same time as Air Caribbean Flight 309's take-off, Eastern Airlines Flight 75, performed on this date by a Lockheed L-1011 TriStar jet, was approaching Puerto Rico to land at the Luis Munoz Marin International Airport, then known as Isla Verde International Airport.

Right about that time (18:00 local standard time, or 6:00 PM) patrons were arriving at a local bar in Barrio Obrero, a Santurce area near the international airport, to enjoy drinks and socialize during the rest of that late afternoon and ensuing evening & night.

== Crash ==
The two airplanes almost collided over San Juan. Minutes before, Flight 309 announced that they were just past Dorado Airport, where they would have had to report because they were flying under visual flight rules, and were over Levittown instead. Pilot Cannon could not contact Dorado Airport, because his airplane's approach frequency was inoperative; he phoned the local air controllers from his airplane instead.

Eastern Flight 75's approach had begun over the Atlantic Ocean; the airliner was flying on instrument flight rules(IFR).

At 18:41(6:41 PM), about 5 minutes before flight 309's crash, Cannon was advised as to the position of the Eastern L-1011, which San Juan controllers had observed go down to 3,000 feet and place itself directly behind flight 309, with about two minutes of distance separation between the two aircraft. Because of the difference of speed at which the two airplanes were coming, there was now a danger that the two airliners would collide. Pilot Cannon acknowledged having the Eastern L-1011 in sight. He was heard saying "Yeah, I got him" to San Juan control tower, referring to the Eastern jet. At 18:42(6:42 PM), the smaller aircraft was told by the controllers to head in a southeast direction at 130 degrees in order to let the Eastern airplane overpass the Air Caribbean one, at the same time the controllers warned the Air Caribbean plane about the possible effects of wake turbulence.

A few seconds later, controllers turned their attention to the Eastern L-1011, telling them that Air Caribbean flight 309 would now be following them for final descent. The L-1011 had by now descended to 1,400 feet, its speed lowered from 220 knots to about 146 knots, while the Air Caribbean aircraft was at 110 knots, which caused the Eastern L-1011 to delay its overtaking of the Puerto Rican airliner until now.

At 18:43(6:43 PM), pilot Cannon told controllers that he had lost sight of the Eastern jet. The airplanes were so close, however, that an Eastern pilot who was riding jump-seat on the L-1011 later testified he could see the Beech's passengers' silhouettes from his vantage point. This closeness between the two airplanes is considered to have caused hazardous wake turbulence for Air Caribbean flight 309.

The wake turbulence led pilot Cannon to lose control of the Beech aircraft. Because he was flying at under 1,000 feet at the time of the crash, he had no time to recover, and the airplane plummeted into the local bar near Residencial Las Casas, killing him and all five passengers aboard, and injuring several patrons at the bar, including a local mechanic identified by the press as Luciano Rivera.

The Eastern Air Lines airplane landed safely at the airport, with no injuries reported among the crew and passengers on that aircraft.

== Aftermath ==
Family members of those killed in the crash and some of the injured at the bar filed a class-action lawsuit against Air Caribbean, Eastern Airlines, the Federal Aviation Administration, Francisco Cruz and Cornhill Insurance (which represented the Lloyd's of London firm in this case).

Ultimately, Eastern and the FAA admitted liability and settled with the claimants for an amount of $5,690,000.

== PSA 182 ==
The accident occurred only one day after the accident of PSA Flight 182 in San Diego, California. Had Eastern Flight 75 and Air Caribbean Flight 309 collided, it would have been the second accident of its kind in similar circumstances in American territory on back to back days.

== See also ==
- 2008 Mexico City Learjet crash
- American Airlines Flight 587
- Med Jets Flight 056 – crashed near a mall and also killed 6 people
