= Cano Estremera =

Puerto Rican Salsa singer (1958–2020)

Carlos Enrique Estremera Colón (2 September 1958 – 28 October 2020) was a Puerto Rican Salsa singer, a native of Santurce, Puerto Rico. Estremera was nicknamed "el niño de oro" (transl. "the golden boy") and later "el dueño del soneo" (transl. "the owner of "soneo""), for his uncanny ability to improvise lyrics to Salsa music. Estremera was albino, and billed as "El Cano" (transl. "the blonde guy").

== Career ==
In his early years, Estremera lived in Residencial Las Casas, a large public housing complex located in Santurce, San Juan, Puerto Rico. Estremera developed his talent as a singer while performing with other musicians in Barrio Obrero, one of the forty subbarrios of Santurce, not far from Tras Talleres, in Santurce, where many Puerto Rican Salsa musicians and other celebrities (such as Daniel Santos, Andy Montañez and Ossie Ocasio) were raised. Estremera was known by his fans as el niño de oro (transl. "the golden boy") until proclaiming himself "el dueño del soneo" (transl. "the owner of "soneo""), which he used as a marketing concept, emphasizing his prowess as an on-the-spot improviser.

Estremera acknowledged Puerto Rican jíbaro country singers as a strong influence and developed a reputation for being a fast and clever improviser, in the same vein as Marvin Santiago, Gilberto Santa Rosa, Oscar D'León and other salsa singers who could improvise dozens of soneos (improvisations within a call–response format). Estremera participated in "soneo" battles with other salsa singers, most famously with Domingo Quiñones. In the summer of 1990 performing in Guánica, Yabucoa and Juana Díaz he improvised 105, 128, then 130 "soneos", respectively.

According to Ruben Blades, he met Estremera at a venue in Isla Verde (Puerto Rico) in the early 1970s where Celia Cruz, delighted with Estemera's talent brought him onto the stage. Estremera became famous for his uncanny ability to improvise lyrics during Salsa jams.

In 1978, Estremera joined Bobby Valentín, among other replacements to Valentin's band -namely Santiago and former Sonora Ponceña singer Luiggi Texidor. Estremera recorded six albums before stating his own band in 1984. He was the lead singer on many of the best selling hits by Valentín's band, particularly the band's best seller ever, "La boda de ella" ("Her Wedding"), written by Roberto Angleró.

Estremera enjoyed wild success in Puerto Rico as well as in Brazil and Peru, among other places. His best known hit as a solo artist is "El Toro" ("The Bull"), a humorous take on infidelity (and, in one line, about his low vision). A 2003 CD release celebrated his twenty years in the music industry.

In 2013, Estremera said he felt Puerto Rico was no longer instrumental in keeping the Salsa music genre alive, but that other countries such as Colombia, Perú and Venezuela were. He also faced two incidents where he was vetted from venues in Puerto Rico and Colombia for having had used profanity onstage. As a result, he often polled audiences before addressing specific subjects onstage.

== Health problems and death ==
Estremera had battled pulmonary fibrosis, a condition that is common among albino people. According to his wife, after Hurricane Maria struck Puerto Rico in September 2017, it became difficult for him to find the medications needed to treat his condition. This caused his health to deteriorate. On 2 November 2018, Estremera underwent a dual lung transplant operation at a hospital in Philadelphia, Pennsylvania. After almost a year of his surgery, Estremera was back in Puerto Rico, striving and undergoing physical therapy to regain strength in his legs. The dual lung transplant performed at Penn Medicine in Philadelphia was called an amazing success. However, during the next two years he would be in and out of hospitals until he died in San Juan, Puerto Rico, on October 28, 2020, at age 62. In his last hospital stay, Estremera told his wife, Yamira Arce, that he was tired and asked her to "let him go". Arce said that he told her "I'm checking in but I won't be leaving" (the hospital). Arce also noted that Estremera's death was not due to coronavirus.

== Discography ==
- Puerto Rican Masters, La Historia de la Salsa (2003)
- Opera Ecuajey Vol. 1 (2002)
- Sonora Ponceña 45 Años (1999)
- Diferente (1999)
- Encuentro Histórico (1998)
- Punto y Aparte (1996)
- Cambio de Sentido (1994)
- Éxitos del Dueño del Soneo (1991)
- Dueño del Soneo, Vol.2 (1990)
- Dueño del Soneo, Vol.1 (1989)
- Salvaje '88 (1988)
- El Niño de Oro (1986)

With Bobby Valentín

- En Acción (1984)
- Brujería (1983)
- Presenta a el Cano Estremera (1982)
- Siempre en Forma (1981)
- El Gato (1980)
- La Espinita (1979)
- La Boda de Ella (1978)

== See also ==
- List of Puerto Ricans
