= 2008 Mexico City Learjet 45 crash =

2008 aviation accident in Mexico

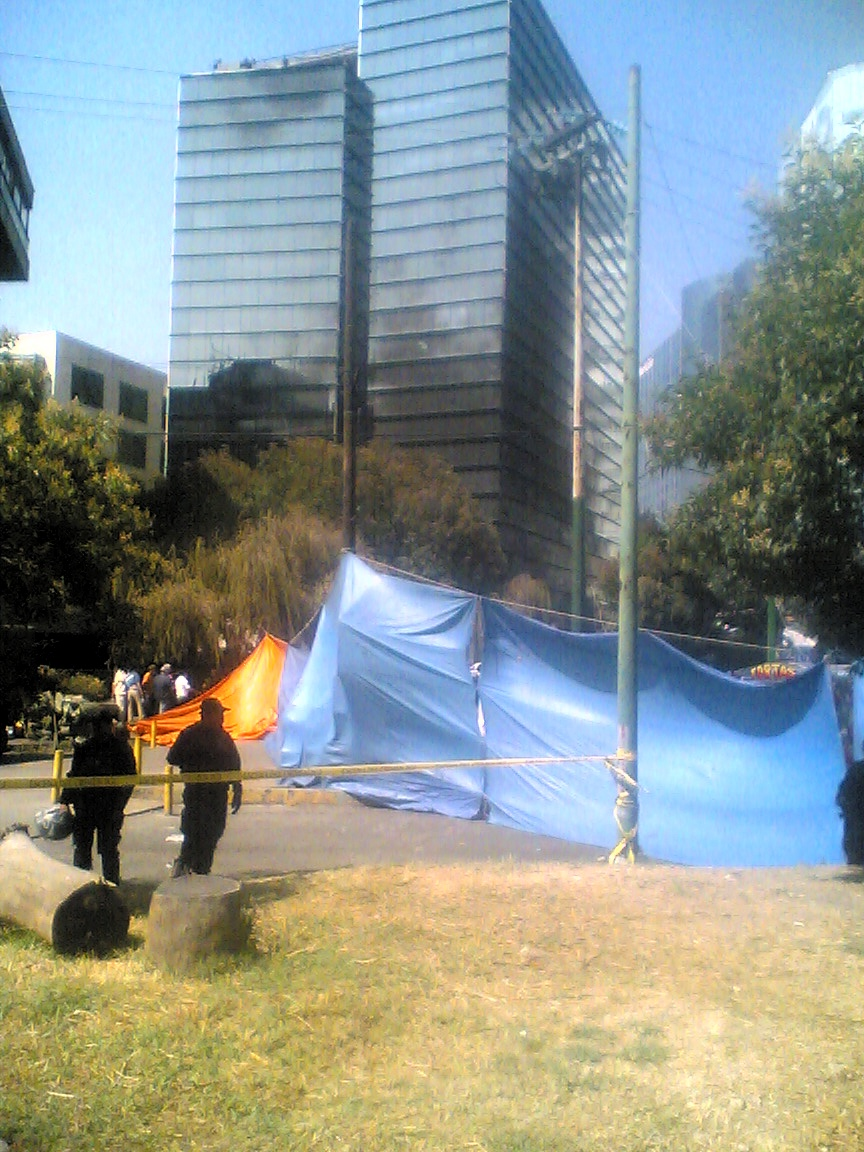
- Police officers guarding the crash site

Accident
- Date: 4 November 2008
- Summary: Encounter with wake turbulence due to pilot error by fraudulently certified flight crew leading to spatial disorientation and loss of control
- Site: Las Lomas, Mexico City, Mexico; 19°25′35″N 99°12′13″W
- Total fatalities: 16
- Total injuries: 40

Aircraft
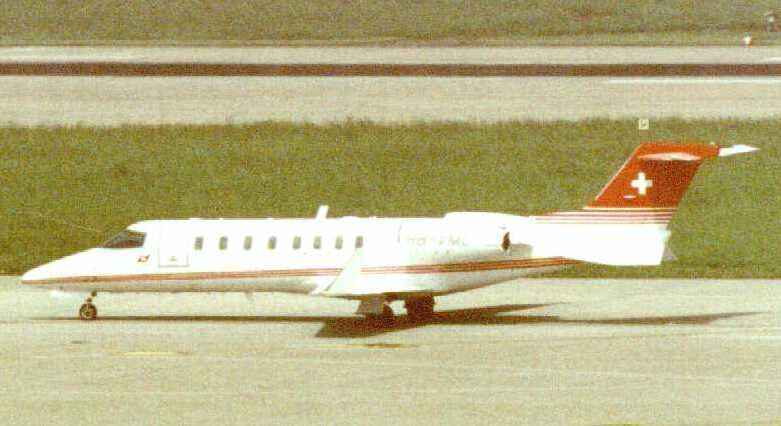
- The aircraft involved in the accident, while still in service with TAG Aeroleasing AG in 2003
- Aircraft type: Learjet 45
- Operator: Secretariat of the Interior
- Call sign: VICTOR MIKE CHARLIE
- Registration: XC-VMC
- Flight origin: Ponciano Arriaga International Airport, San Luis Potosí
- Destination: Mexico City International Airport
- Occupants: 9
- Passengers: 6
- Crew: 3
- Fatalities: 9
- Survivors: 0

Ground casualties
- Ground fatalities: 7
- Ground injuries: 40

On 4 November 2008, a Learjet 45 carrying Mexican Secretary of the Interior Juan Camilo Mouriño, crashed into rushhour traffic in central Mexico City at around 18:45 local time. The crash resulted in the deaths of 16 people, all nine people on board and seven people on the ground. The investigation found that the pilots inadvertently entered the wake left behind by a Mexicana Boeing 767 ahead of them and did not control their descent on approach, causing the accident. Faked type certifications and credentials also contributed to the pilots being unable to deal with the situation.

== Accident ==
The Secretariat of the Interior-owned Learjet 45 (registration XC-VMC) left Ponciano Arriaga International Airport in San Luis Potosí and was 12 km (7.5 mi) short of landing at Mexico City International Airport when it crashed. The plane crashed in rush-hour traffic close to the intersection of Paseo de la Reforma and the Anillo Periférico, in the Las Lomas business district, causing an explosion whose flames "reached higher than the buildings". According to Secretary of Communications and Transport Luis Téllez, there were no survivors. Téllez also stated that the crash appeared to be an accident.

The crash set multiple cars and a newsstand on fire and injured at least 40 people. Body parts were reported to be scattered around the wreckage.

== Deaths ==
All nine people on board and a further seven people on the ground were killed. Among the dead were Secretary of the Interior Juan Camilo Mouriño, top aide to President Felipe Calderón, and José Luis Santiago Vasconcelos, former assistant attorney general.

== Government response ==
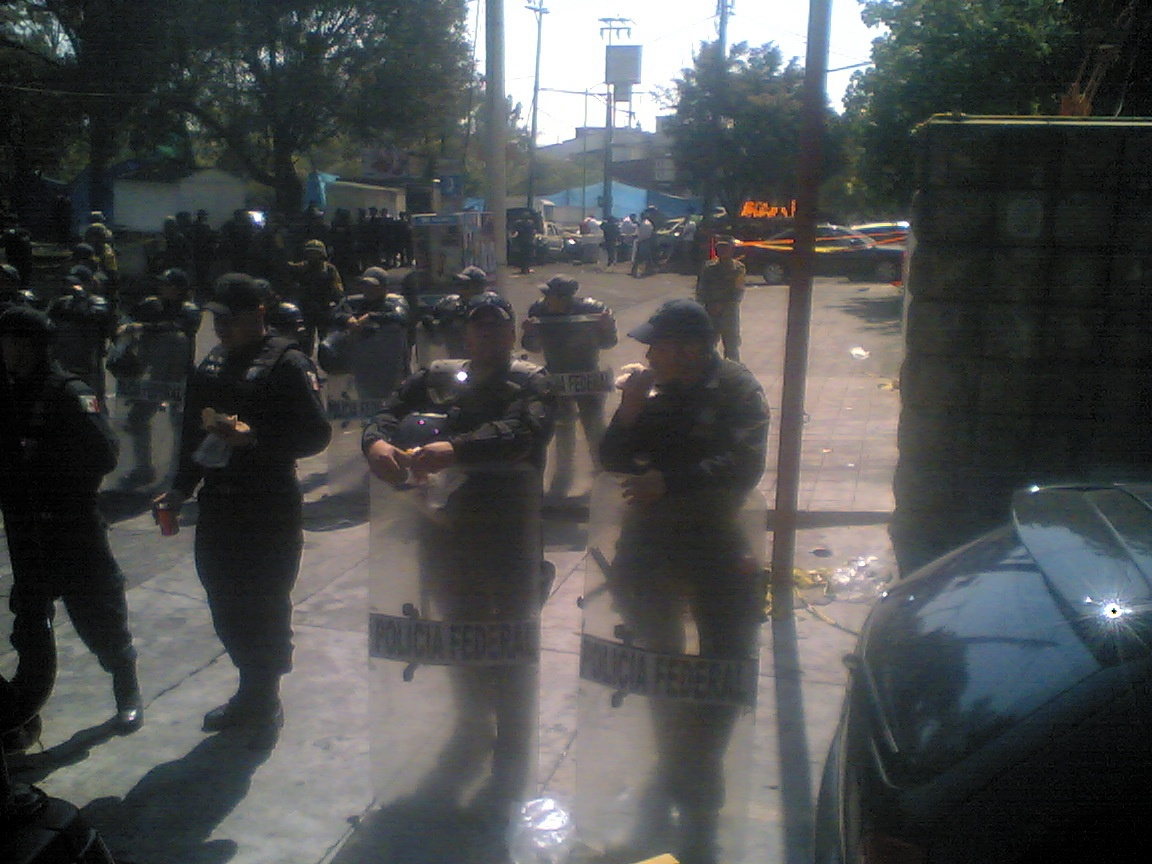
Another angle of police officers guarding the crash site

After the crash, President Calderón addressed the nation live on national television. He spoke of Mouriño as one of his closest friends and collaborators and conveyed his condolences to the family. He stated that Mouriño was a man who always fought to make Mexico a better country and he guaranteed the nation that there would be an investigation into the causes of the crash. Calderón encouraged Mexican men and women to continue fighting for a better country no matter how difficult or painful any event may be.

Marcelo Ebrard, Head of Government of the Federal District, also conveyed his condolences to Mouriño's family assured that Mexico City's government would issue a statement to the nation regarding the issue. Ebrard later said that the Mexico City government would give financial aid to all of the injured receiving medical care, irrespective of whether they had been admitted to private or public hospitals. He also said that the local authorities had handed over all recordings taken by surveillance video cameras to the federal attorney general, along with all witness accounts that local police gathered.

Several other political figures made statements regarding the crash, including various senators from the Institutional Revolutionary Party and Germán Martínez, leader of the ruling National Action Party. A group of senators from different political parties asked the Attorney General of Mexico to investigate the accident.

== Results of investigation ==
The jet's black boxes were sent to the United States for analysis. Information gathered from 38 minutes of cabin conversations, along with video footage from a security camera on top of the Omega Office Building, provided evidence for an official statement by the Mexican government that the crash was the result of pilot error. The Learjet was ruled to have been flying too close to a Boeing 767-300ER operating as Mexicana de Aviación Flight 1692, and as a result suffered violent wake turbulence caused by the larger jet. The minimum allowable distance for a lighter plane following behind a heavier plane is 5 nautical miles (9.3 km); the Learjet was only 4.1 nautical miles (7.6 km) behind the Mexicana plane.

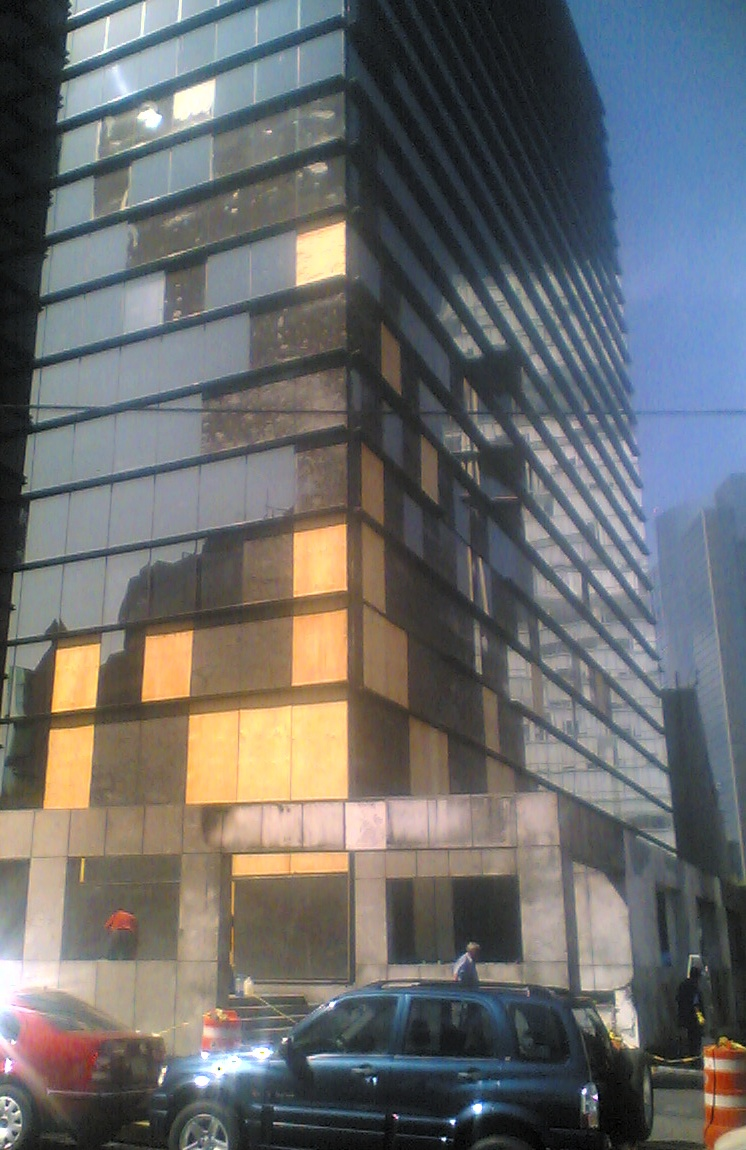
Repair two weeks after the crash

Investigations into the accident discovered several issues with the Mexican government's use of private contractors as pilots of government aircraft.

Several key elements of the accident emerged during the investigation:

- Pilot Martín Olíva and co-pilot Álvaro Sánchez were not certified to operate the Learjet 45. The investigation concluded that both pilots had received fraudulent certifications: Captain Olíva lied about the number of training flights he had made, and had issues on the few training flights he did complete, while Captain Sánchez lied about being a Learjet 45 instructor. Both men had taken advantage of a corrupt system to get false training documents and some unsigned Learjet 45 certification forms from their flight schools. These revelations led Mexican authorities to suspend the licences of both flight schools.
- The descent profile showed that the improperly trained pilots approached the airport with an inconsistent descent angle. The plane descended rapidly and then leveled off in a stepped approach to the airport. The plane did not slow down to the required speed dictated by the air traffic controller, which brought the plane closer to the Mexicana 767-300ER.
- Conversation among the flight crew further indicates that they had little familiarity with the operation of the plane; they voiced confusion on several occasions about the cockpit instruments and failed to enter the proper information into the flight computers, did not follow a proper flight plan, and had navigational difficulties, missing their original arrival to San Luis Potosí by over 250 nautical miles (460 km).
- The flight crew waited over a minute to follow the order from air traffic control to reduce their speed. The Learjet had been traveling at 262 knots (485 km/h), while the Mexicana 767-300ER was flying at 185 knots (343 km/h); this caused the Learjet to get too close to the 767-300ER.
- The accident happened during peak hours at the airport with heavy air traffic, which called into question the handling and scheduling of flight plans for top government officials.
- The accident happened just at the point where aircraft entering Mexico City traveling on a 170° course (south-southeast) make a sharp left turn to align with the runways of Benito Juárez International Airport at 53° (northeast). When the Learjet reached the turning point, too close behind the Mexicana 767-300ER, and making a steep descent that dropped it through the violent wake turbulence, it caused the plane to invert into a nose-down attitude. At this point, the plane was within 1,700 feet (520 m) of the ground, limiting the room to enact a recovery.
- The weather at the time of the accident was calm, which sustained the wake turbulence.
- Due to the flight crew being unqualified for the plane, when faced with the conditions regarding the airspeed, inverted nose-down position, and insufficient altitude, they were unable to regain control of the plane. Though it was too late to make any difference, and too marginal to be meaningful, the flight crew did manage to reduce the angle of descent from 45° to 40° before hitting the ground at over 300 miles per hour (480 km/h).

== Dramatization ==
The accident and subsequent investigation were featured in Season 14 – Episode 8 of documentary series Mayday. The episode was titled "Inner City Carnage" in the United Kingdom and Australia and "Accident or Assassination" in the United States and Canada.

There has been controversy and conspiracy theories due to the nature of the crash and whether if it had any relation to the drug-trafficking world (suggesting it was crashed on purpose) and, relating it to the corruption within governmental institutions. One uses as evidence the fact that a helicopter, with registration XA-JSL flew a mere 600 m from the Learjet that day according to the Secretary of Communications and Transportation and Luis Téllez, without any problems whatsoever from the wake turbulence.

== See also ==
- Air Caribbean Flight 309
- Aeroflot Flight 593
- United Airlines 585
- 2011 Lokomotiv Yaroslavl plane crash, an accident where pilots who did not complete training made many mistakes.
- American Airlines Flight 587, an accident where poor training caused the pilot to overreact to wake turbulence from a Boeing 747 that had taken off ahead of them.
- Tatarstan Airlines Flight 363, an accident in which the captain used fake credentials to get his license and both pilots being poorly trained.
- Colgan Air Flight 3407, an accident where the plane fell out of the sky and crashed just before final approach.
- Saudia Flight 163, an accident which the first officer used fake credentials to get his license and being poorly trained followed by the crew’s failure to evacuate during fire.
