= Air Caribbean (Puerto Rico) =

Puerto Rican airline

- Founded: 1975; 51 years ago in Puerto Rico
- Ceased operations: 1979; 47 years ago
- Operating bases: Isla Verde International Airport

Air Caribbean was an airline that served from Isla Verde International Airport, in San Juan. The 1970s and 1980s were decades when several Puerto Rican airlines existed and competed against each other, including Prinair, Vieques Air Link and Dorado Wings. Believing a share of the market profits could be gained, Air Caribbean was created in 1975.

There was one thread in common between Puerto Rican airlines of the time: Since at Luis Muñoz Marín International Airport they would face tough, jet competition from major airlines (such as American, Air France, British Caledonian, Delta, Eastern, Iberia, Lufthansa, Mexicana and Pan Am, to name a few) shall they try to offer jet services to further away cities, they would have faced economical problems. Most of them (except Prinair, which actually had a service to Florida for a short period of time), stuck to routes around the Caribbean.

Air Caribbean was not the exception. The airline used DC-3 aircraft from its beginnings, to nearby Caribbean islands, and to Rafael Hernández Airport in Aguadilla. The airline also used leased Beech 18 airplanes. The airline was prominent for some time among Puerto Rican travellers and American tourists, as it provided, with Prinair, the only two commercial air services to Aguadilla and easier access to nearby Quebradillas. The 1970s, as it is widely known, were difficult times for airlines because of the oil crisis (1973 and 1979) and deregulation of the industry in the U.S.

In addition, another competitor, Aero Virgin Islands from the U.S. Virgin Islands, proved an impossible obstacle to overcome for Air Caribbean. In 1979, the airline had its last flight. Aero Virgin Islands also outlasted Prinair; out of the aforementioned Caribbean airlines, the only ones still providing service are Prinair and Vieques Air Link, with Prinair having restarted services during 2019.

== Accidents and incidents ==
- On September 26, 1978, at 18:45 local time, a Beech 18, leased by Air Caribbean, tried to land at Isla Verde Airport in San Juan after a domestic flight, flight 309, from what was then known as Ramey base airport in Aguadilla when it crashed near Residencial Las Casas instead, killing all six occupants in the airplane and injuring several occupants of a bar, including local mechanic Luciano Rivera. Wake turbulence from an Eastern Airlines L-1011 was found to be the cause of this crash, but the accident nevertheless led to the general public losing some trust on the airline.

== See also ==
- List of defunct airlines of the United States
