= Isla Guachinanga =

Island in Santurce, San Juan, Puerto Rico

Native name: Guachinanga
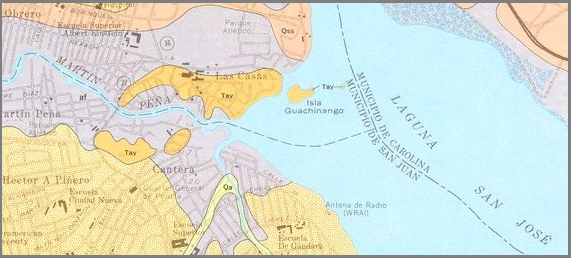
- Isla Guachinango in the Laguna San Jose in Santurce, near its border with Carolina

- Location within Puerto Rico Location within Lesser Antilles Location within the Caribbean

Geography
- Location: near the Atlantic Ocean
- Coordinates: 18°25′48″N 66°02′07″W

Administration
- Puerto Rico
- Commonwealth: Puerto Rico
- Capital and largest city: San Juan

Demographics
- Population: 0 (2015)

Additional information
- Time zone: AST (UTC-4)

Isla Guachinanga is a small island located in Santurce, San Juan, Puerto Rico.

The island, which has a number of trees and ecological areas, was reportedly littered with trash as of 2013.

Isla Guachinanga is near Barrio Obrero and Residencial Las Casas.
