= Residencial Las Casas =

Public housing complex located in San Juan, Puerto Rico

Coordinates: 18.4363°N 66.0443°W

Residencial Fray Bartolomé de Las Casas, more commonly known as Residencial Las Casas, Caserio Las Casas or Las Casas, is a public housing complex located in San Juan, Puerto Rico consisting of 417 housing units. It is under the management of the Puerto Rico Housing Authority (Administración de Vivienda Pública in Spanish) and is under the federal housing program of the U.S. Department of Housing and Urban Development. It was named after the famous Spaniard Roman Catholic Fray Bartolomé de Las Casas, who also has a town named after him in Mexico, namely San Cristóbal de las Casas.

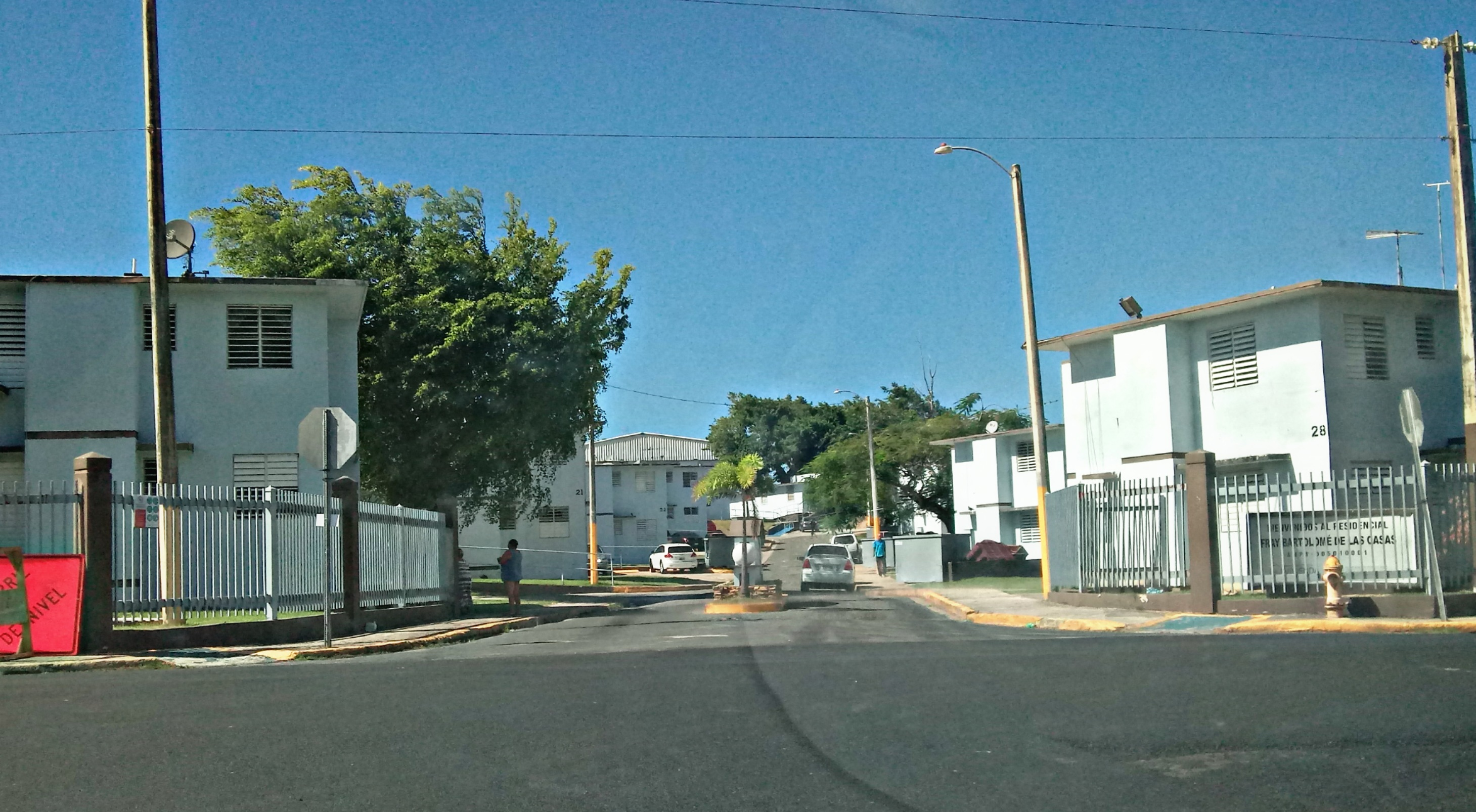
Residencial Las Casas in Santurce, San Juan

The Complex is located in an area that was used by the United States military beginning in 1908, as a training camp for the Porto Rico Regiment of Infantry that saw action in World War I and World War II. During that era, the area was known as "Camp Las Casas". It also was Puerto Rico's first commercial air field, with the first Puerto Rican pilot, Félix Rigau Carrera, taking off on the first inter-island flight from the air field, and Aerovías Nacionales de Puerto Rico offering airline service during the 1930s.

Residencial Las Casas was built during the 1950s, after the military had left the area, with middle class customers in mind. Many of San Juan's affluent families bought property there. One of its earliest residents was Puerto Rican actress Míriam Colón and activist Antonia Pantoja.

During the late 1970s, on September 26, 1978, resident Luciano Rivera made the headlines nationally, as he was one of a few survivors of an aviation crash, Air Caribbean Flight 309, that happened nearby; six people were killed when a Beech 18 belonging to Air Caribbean airlines crashed in Barrio Obrero, at a bar in front of the residencial, trying to land at Isla Verde after a domestic flight from Aguadilla.

By the early 1980s, salsa singer Cano Estremera, a resident, began bringing his musician friends over to practice at Las Casas. Estremera would go on to become a legendary singer and international super-star who, in 2003, made a CD commemorating his twenty years in the music industry.

== See also ==
- Public housing in Puerto Rico
- For other meanings of Las Casas, see: Las Casas (disambiguation)
- Isla Guachinanga, an island steps away from the residencial
- Residencial Luis Lloréns Torres
