= Obrero (Santurce) =

Subbarrio of Santurce in San Juan, Puerto Rico

Coordinates: 18°26′06″N 66°03′16″W

- Subbarrio
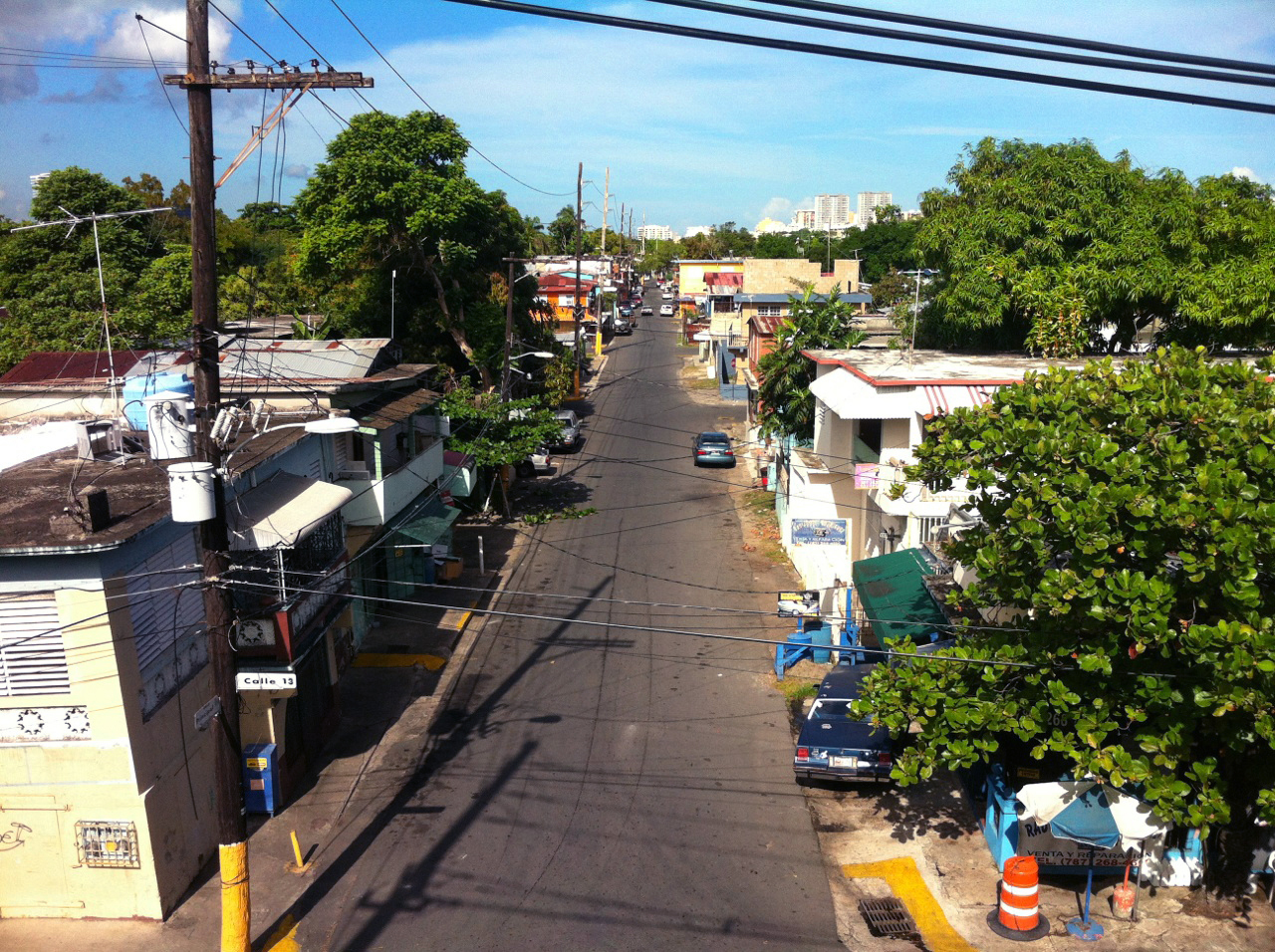
- View of Barrio Obrero in Santurce, 2012

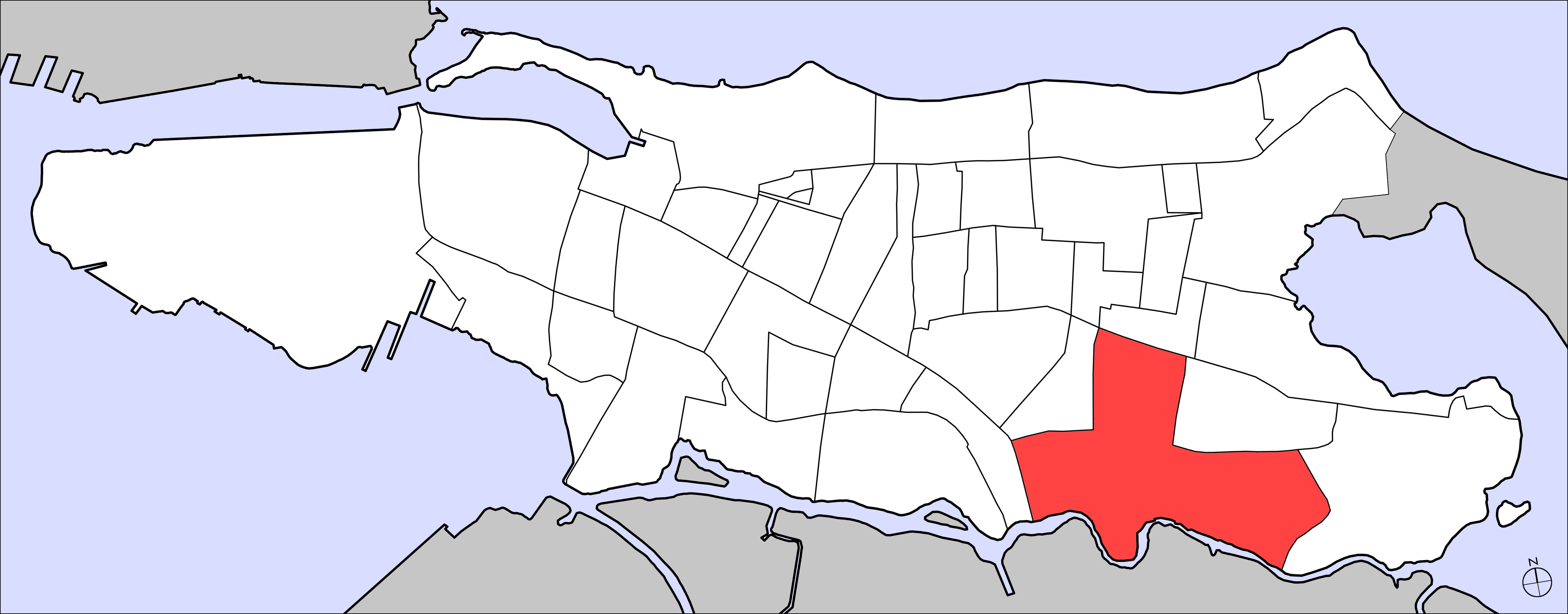
- Commonwealth: Puerto Rico
- Municipality: San Juan
- Barrio: Santurce

Area
  - Total: .42 sq mi (1.1 km^{2})
  - Land: .40 sq mi (1.0 km^{2})
  - Water: .02 sq mi (0.052 km^{2})
- Elevation: 10 ft (3.0 m)

Population (2010)
  - Total: 10,316
  - Density: 25,790/sq mi (9,960/km^{2})
- Source: 2010 Census
- Time zone: UTC−4 (AST)

Obrero (often called Barrio Obrero) is one of 40 subbarrios of Santurce in the municipality of San Juan, Puerto Rico. It is the most populated and one of the most impoverished districts in Santurce. The Residencial Las Casas public housing is located in the area.

== Demographics ==
In 1940, Obrero had a population of 15,974. In 1950, Obrero had a population of 25,219.

In 2000, Obrero had a population of 11,467.

In 2010, Obrero had a population of 10,316 and a population density of 25,790 persons per square mile.

== Hurricane Maria ==
Hurricane Maria which hit Puerto Rico on September 20, 2017, devastated Obrero with major flooding and winds that tore roofs off homes.

== Gallery ==
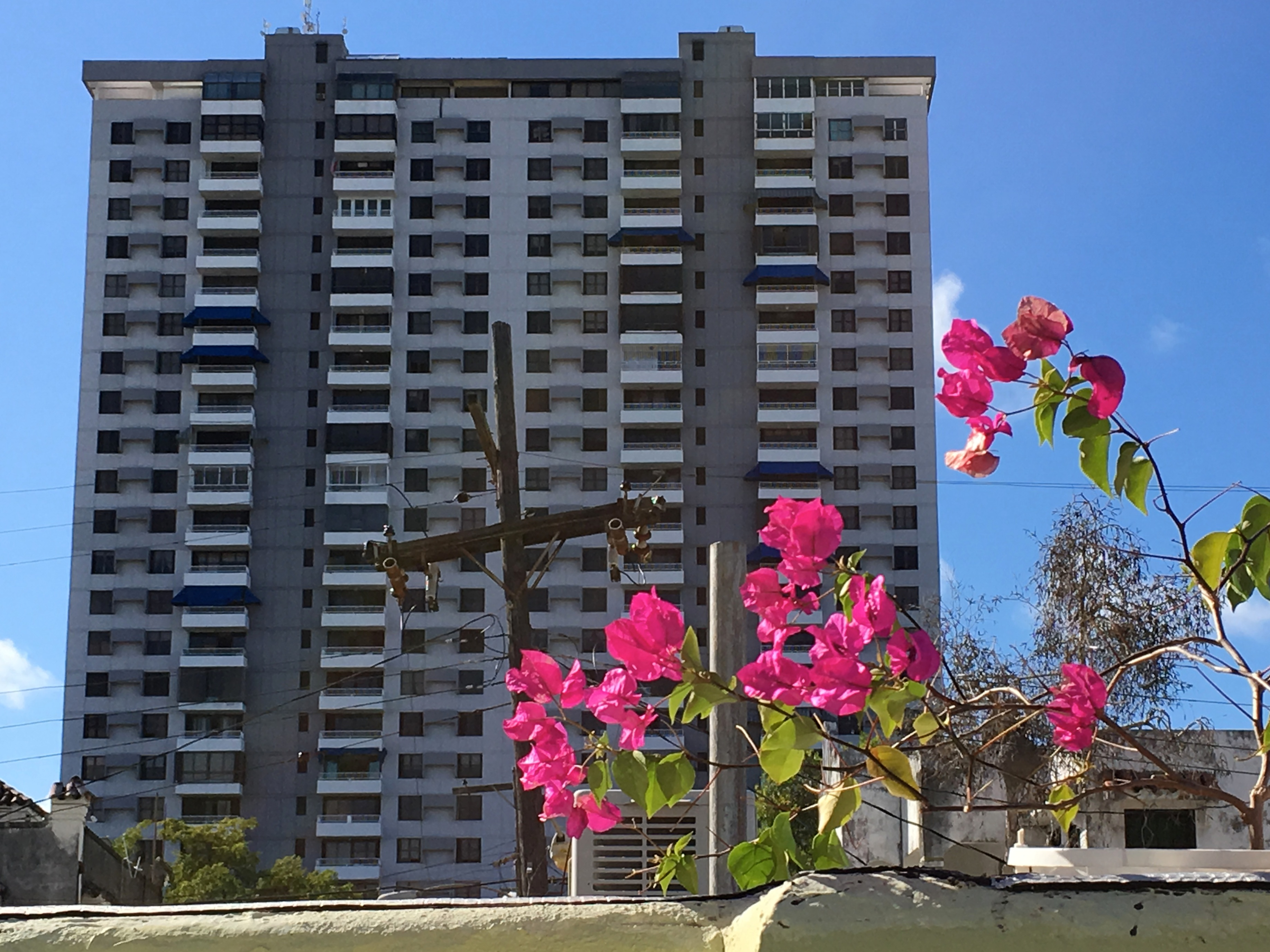
Building and flowers in Obrero

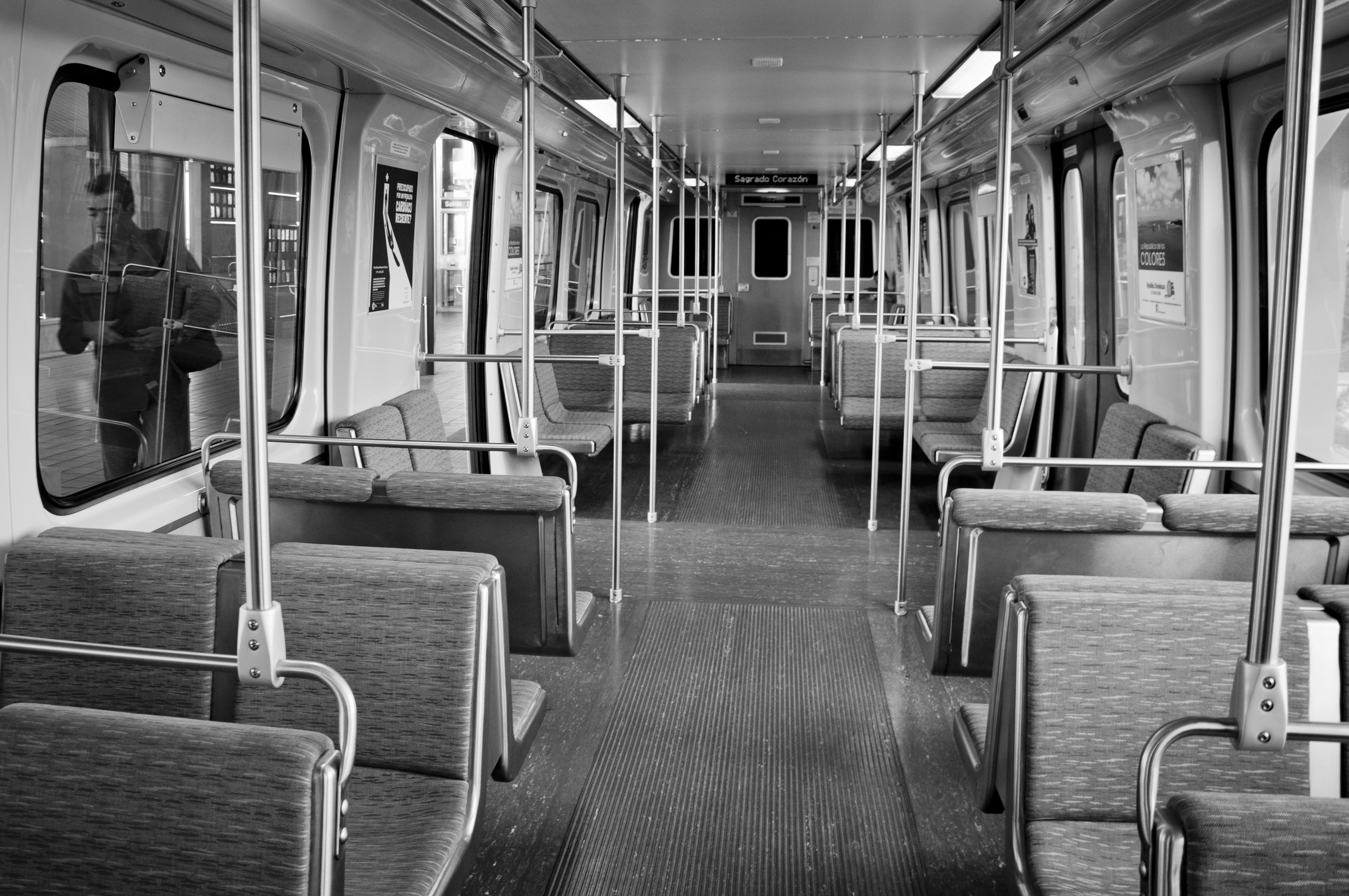
Tren Urbano between Sagrado Corazon and Obrero

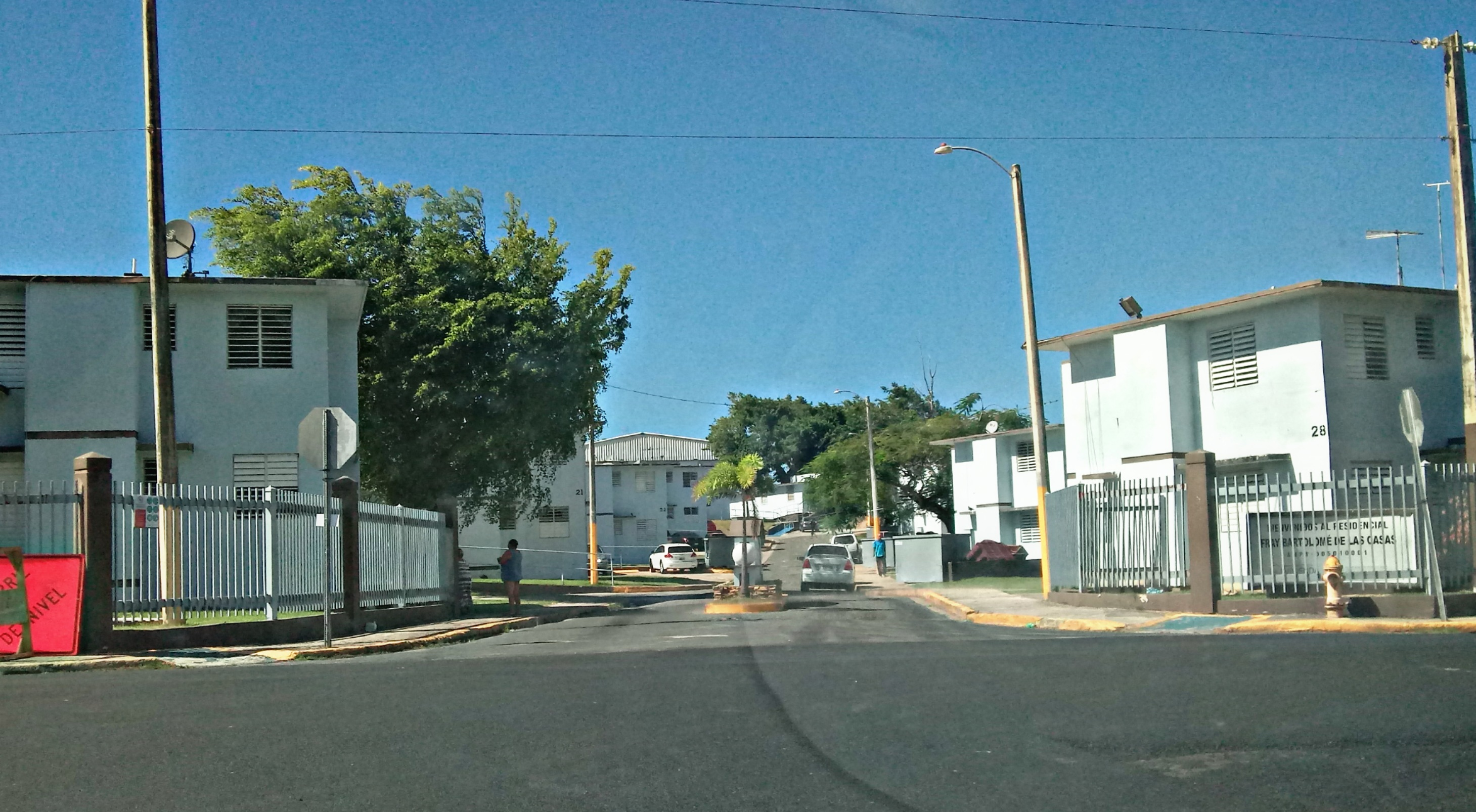
Residencial Las Casas in Santurce is near Barrio Obrero

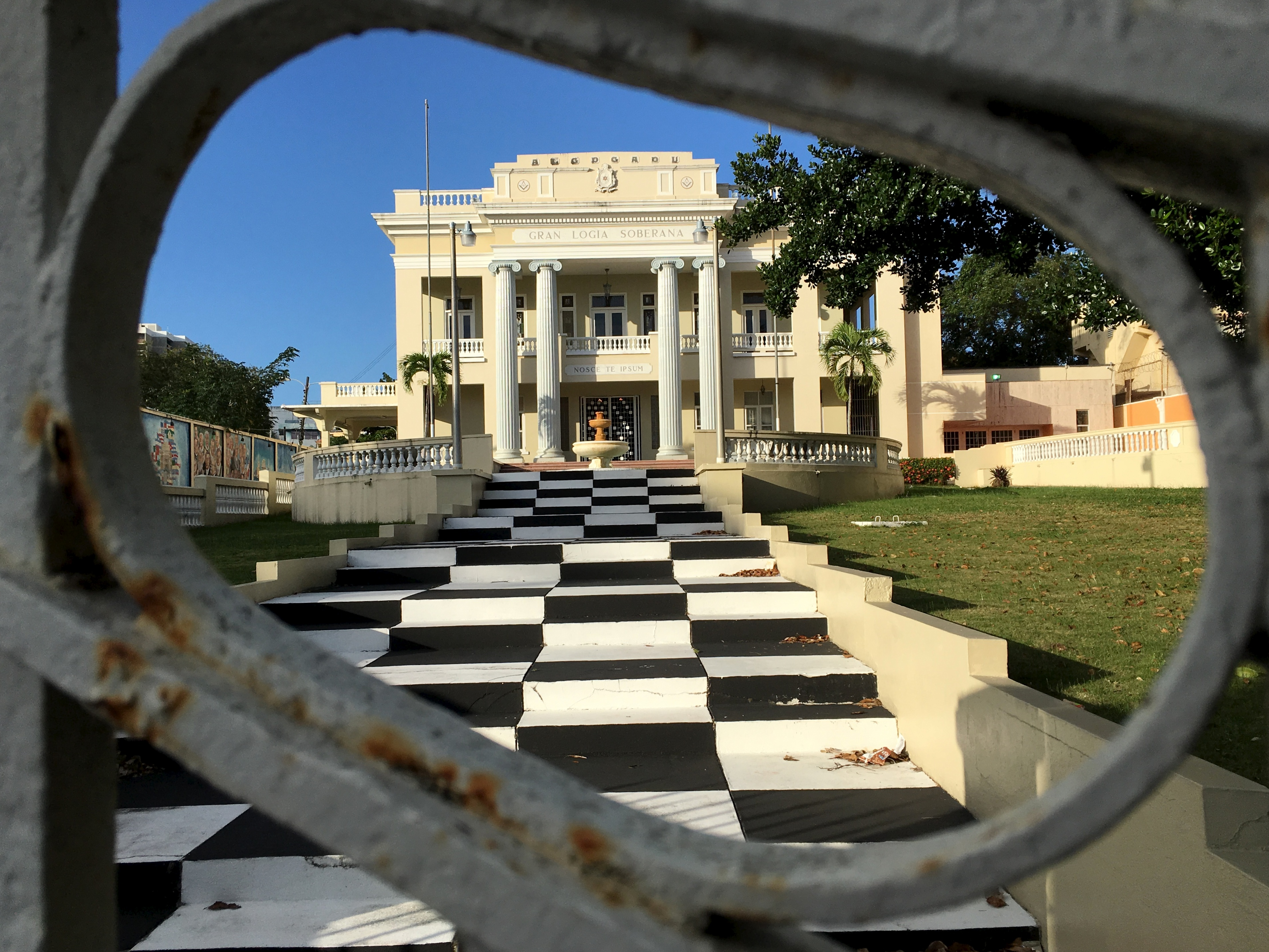
Gran Logia Soberana de Puerto Rico is a Masonic Grand Lodge in Obrero

== See also ==
- List of communities in Puerto Rico
