= Roosevelt station (Puerto Rico) =

Rail station of the Tren Urbano system in San Juan, Puerto Rico

Roosevelt
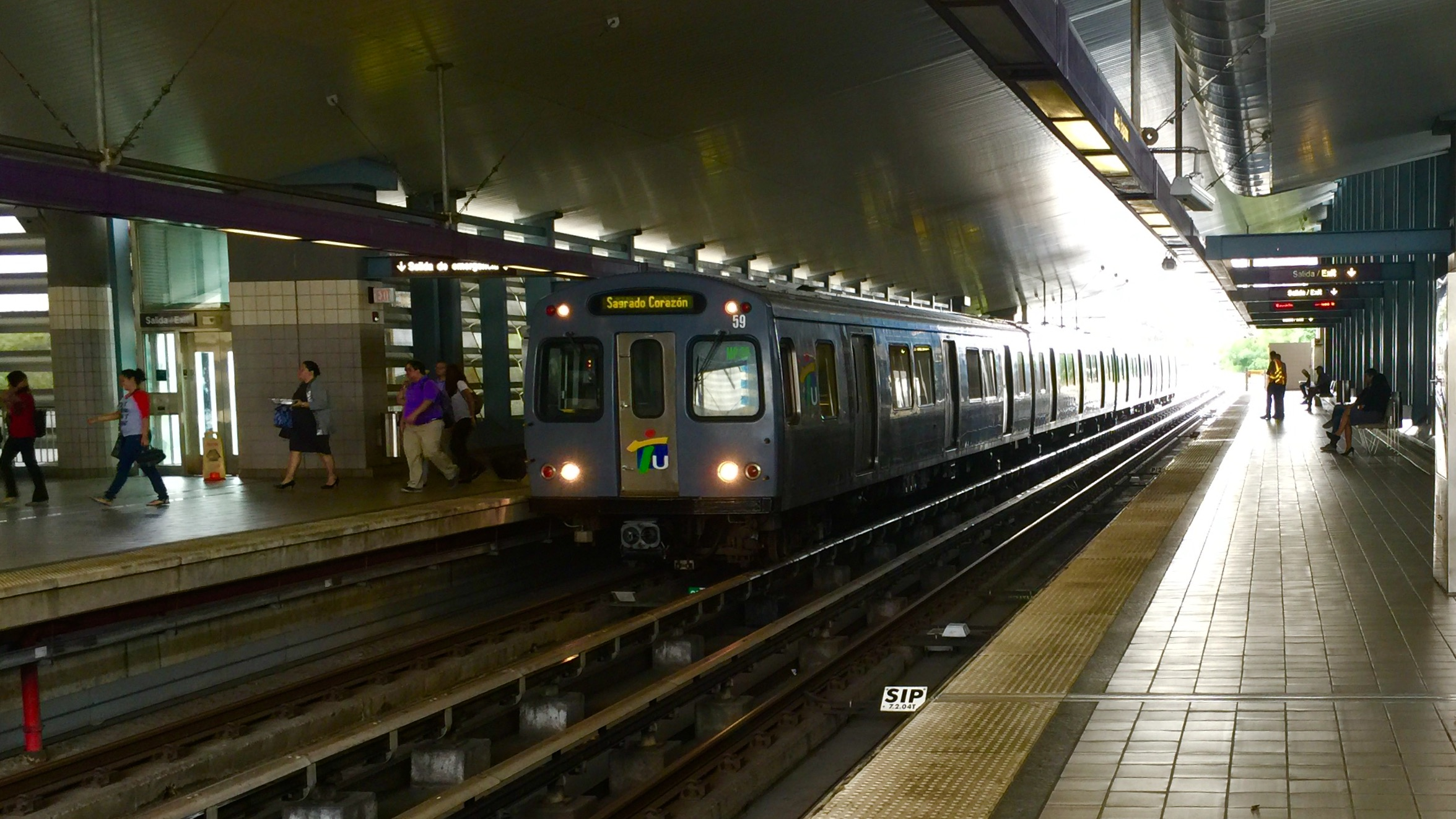
- General view of station

General information
- Location: Franklin D. Roosevelt Ave. San Juan, Puerto Rico
- Coordinates: 18.423301°N 66.059058°W
- Owner: Puerto Rico Department of Transportation and Public Works
- Operator: Alternate Concepts
- Platforms: 2 side platforms
- Tracks: 2

Construction
- Structure type: Elevated
- Accessible: Yes

History
- Opened: December 17, 2004; 21 years ago

Services
Preceding station	Tren Urbano	Following station
Domenech toward Bayamón	Tren Urbano	Hato Rey toward Sagrado Corazón
Location

Roosevelt station is a rapid transit station in San Juan, Puerto Rico, located in the Hato Rey Norte barrio and the Milla de Oro financial district. The station is named after the Franklin D. Roosevelt Avenue where it is located. The station opened on December 17, 2004. It features a tile mural by the artist Susana Espinosa entitled Encuentros Fugaces.

== Nearby ==
- Milla de Oro
- Banco Popular
- Casa Club Sigma
- Plaza Las Américas (further west on Roosevelt Avenue)

== Gallery ==
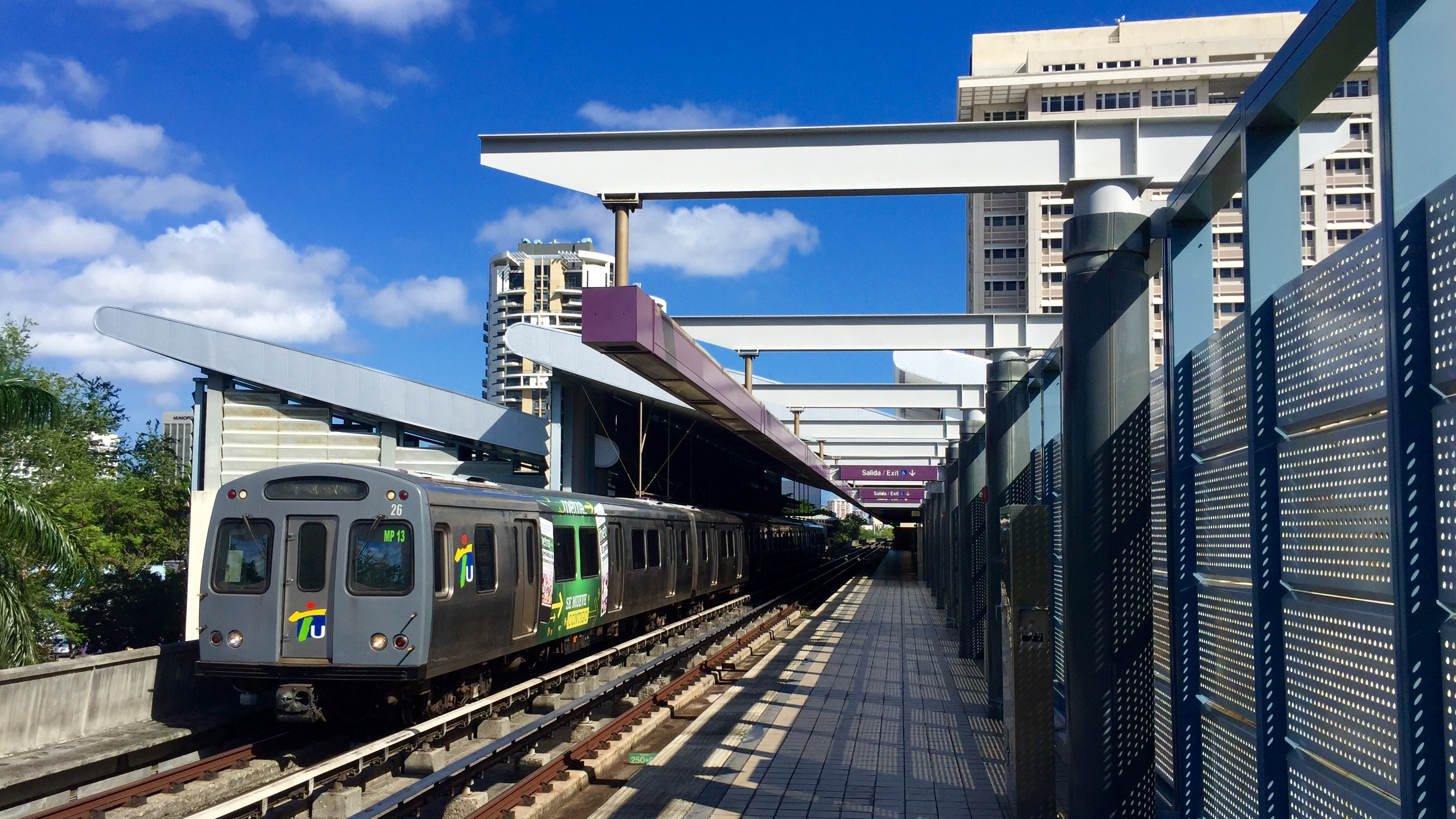
View of the exterior platform

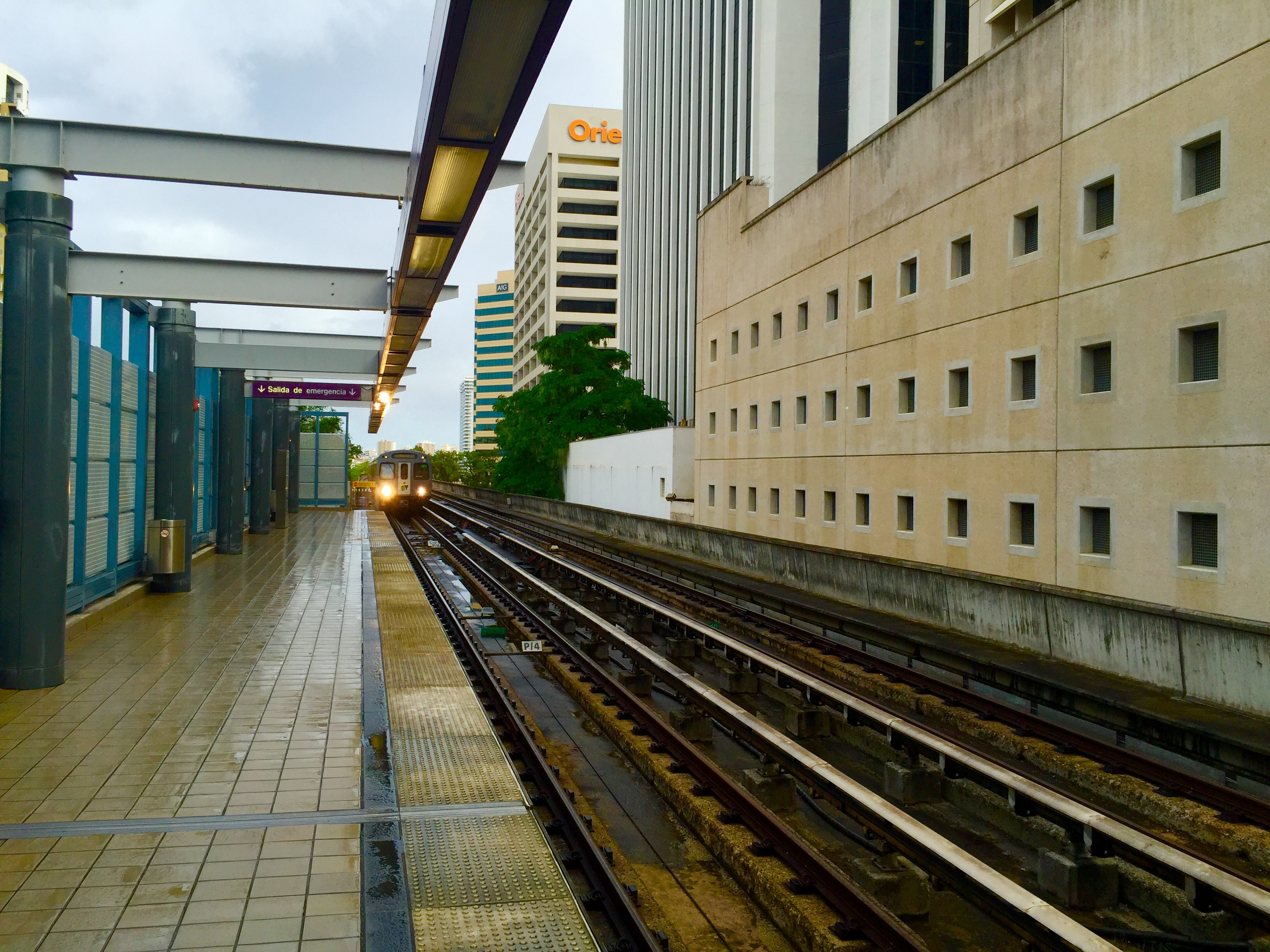
View of business highrises of Milla de Oro from the station platform

== See also ==
- List of San Juan Tren Urbano stations
