= Piñero station =

Rail station of the Tren Urbano system in San Juan, Puerto Rico

Piñero
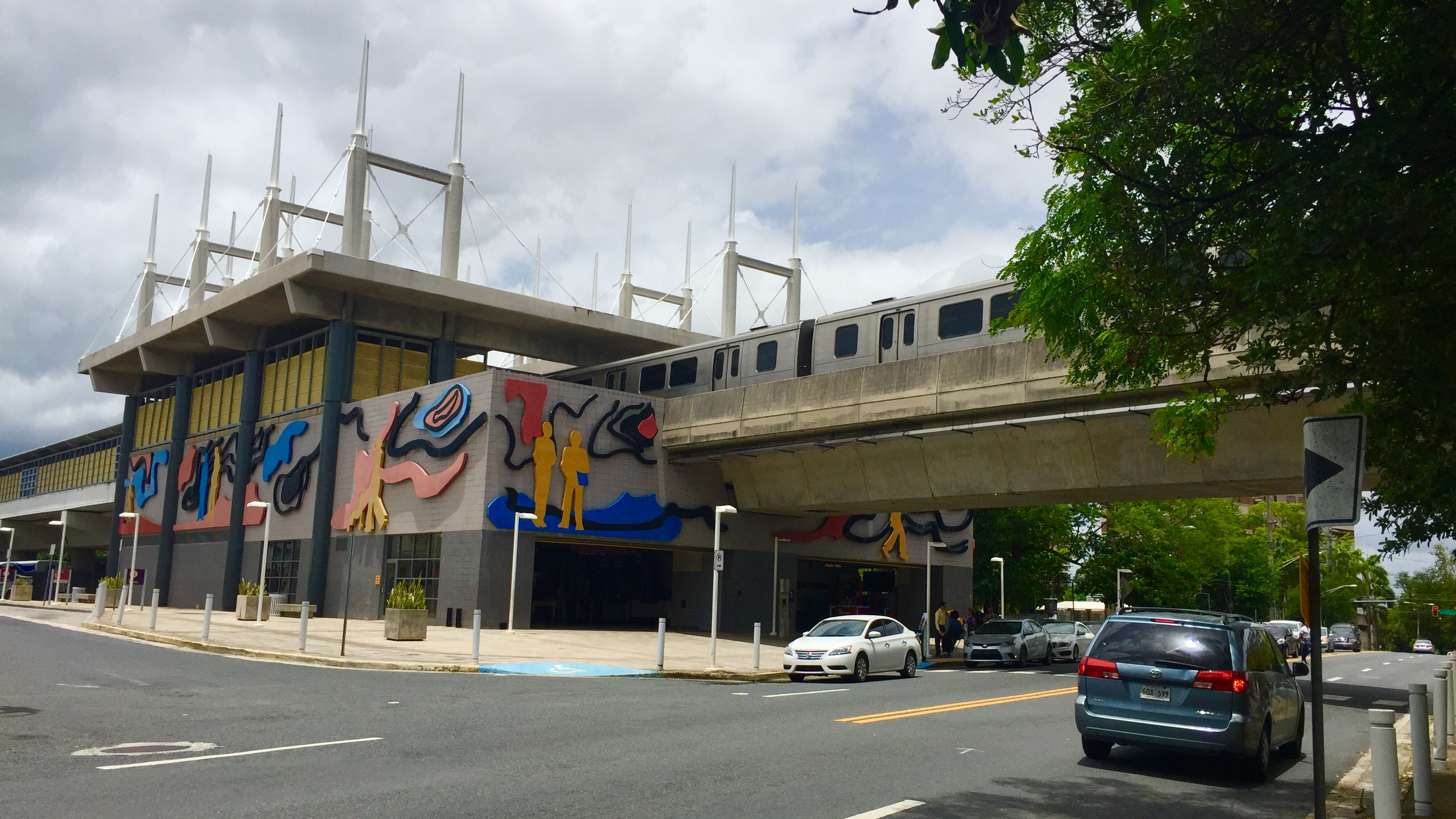
- Outside view of station

General information
- Location: Calle Penuelas; San Juan, Puerto Rico
- Coordinates: 18.410727°N 66.055169°W
- Owner: Puerto Rico Department of Transportation and Public Works
- Operator: Alternate Concepts
- Platforms: 2 side platforms
- Tracks: 2

Construction
- Structure type: Elevated
- Accessible: Yes

History
- Opened: December 17, 2004; 21 years ago

Services
Preceding station	Tren Urbano	Following station
Universidad toward Bayamón	Tren Urbano	Domenech toward Sagrado Corazón
Location

Piñero station is a railway station in San Juan, Puerto Rico located in the Hato Rey Sur district. The station is named after the Jesús T. Piñero Avenue where it is located. The station opened on December 17, 2004. It features a work of public art entitled Viandante by the artist Marnie Pérez Molière.

== Nearby ==
- Centro Judicial de San Juan
- Hospital Español Auxilio Mutuo
- El Monte Mall
- Condominio El Monte

== Bus terminal ==
- D26: TU Piñero–Río Piedras–Venus Gardens
- E40: TU Piñero–The Mall of San Juan–Luis Muñoz Marín International Airport (SJU)
- T8: TU Piñero–Ave. Jesús T. Piñero–TU Martínez Nadal
- T41: TU Piñero– Ave. Barbosa-Cal. De Diego–The Mall of San Juan–Iturregui

== See also ==
- List of Tren Urbano stations
