= Puerto Rico Highway 23 =

Highway in Puerto Rico

Highway 23
- Ruta 23
- Avenida Franklin Delano Roosevelt

Route information
- Maintained by Puerto Rico DTPW
- Length: 6.4 km (4.0 mi)

Major junctions
- West end: PR-2 / PR-165 in Pueblo Viejo
- Avenida José de Diego in Gobernador Piñero; PR-18 in Hato Rey Norte; PR-1 in Hato Rey Norte; PR-25 in Hato Rey Norte–Hato Rey Central
- East end: PR-27 in Hato Rey Central–Oriente

Location
- Country: United States
- Territory: Puerto Rico
- Municipalities: Guaynabo, San Juan

Highway system
- Roads in Puerto Rico; List
← PR-22	→ PR-24

Puerto Rico Highway 23 (PR-23), also known as Franklin Delano Roosevelt Avenue along its entire length, is a main highway in San Juan, Puerto Rico. It begins at the interchange of PR-2 and PR-165 near San Patricio in Guaynabo and goes east to the Milla de Oro business area, passing through Plaza Las Américas and ending at Barbosa Avenue (PR-27) junction in eastern Hato Rey.

== Route description ==
Running 6.4 kilometers (4.0 mi) from Barbosa Avenue (PR-27) in eastern Hato Rey to San Patricio Avenue near the city limits of San Juan and Guaynabo, Roosevelt Avenue is densely developed throughout most of its span, connecting most residential areas of San Juan, such as Puerto Nuevo, Hato Rey Este, Barrio Obrero, Floral Park, San José, and the residential and commercial area of San Patricio in Guaynabo. Most of the known shops in San Juan are located along Roosevelt Avenue, between these is Plaza Las Américas, the first American-style shopping center in Puerto Rico, and the largest shopping center in Puerto Rico and the Caribbean. Also, Roosevelt Avenue passes just south of the Golden Mile (Milla de Oro), the main financial district of San Juan.

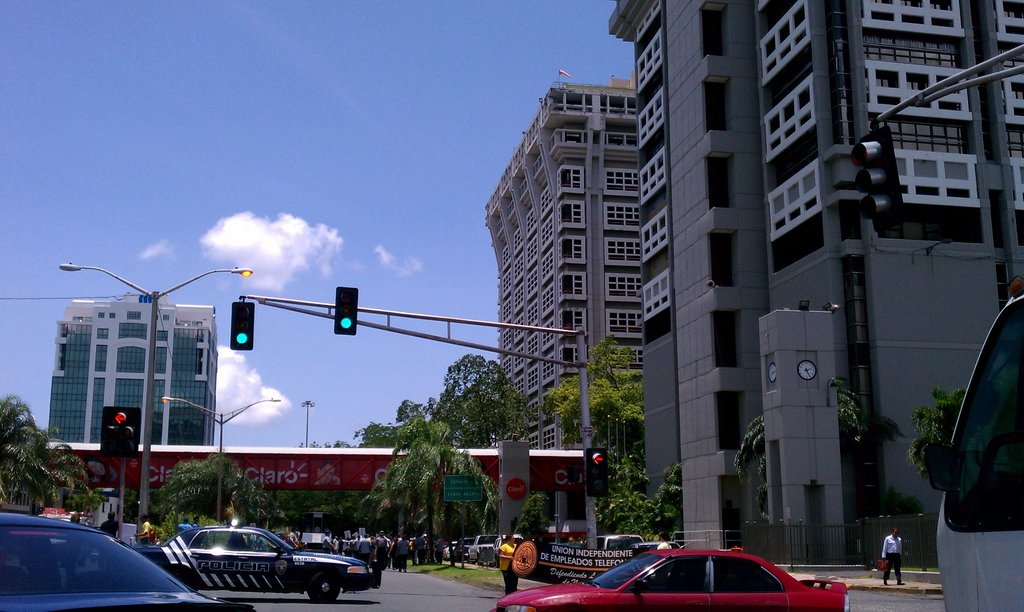
Roosevelt Avenue closed due to strikes by telephone company employees on August 11, 2011

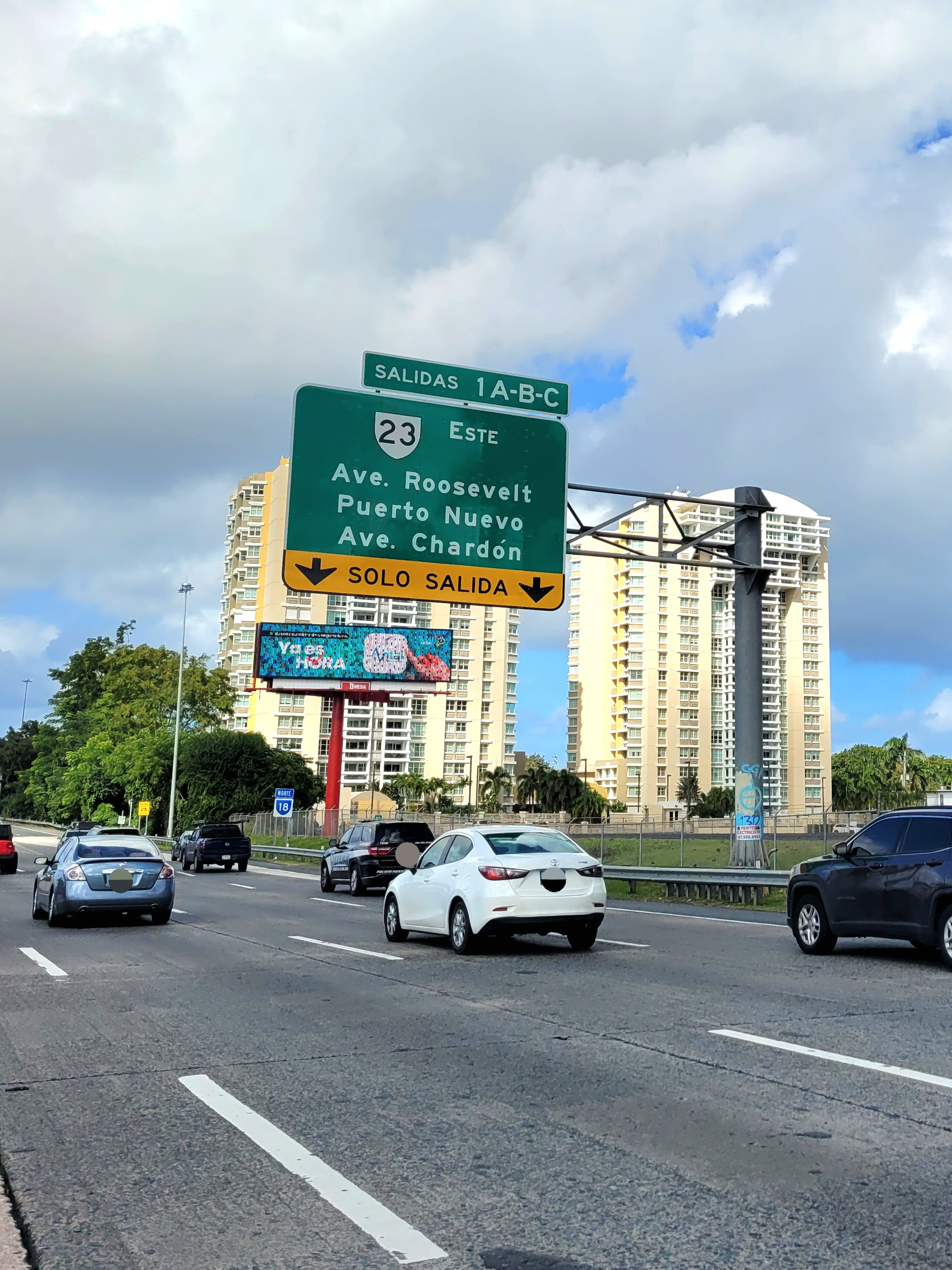
PR-18 north near exits 1A-B-C to PR-23

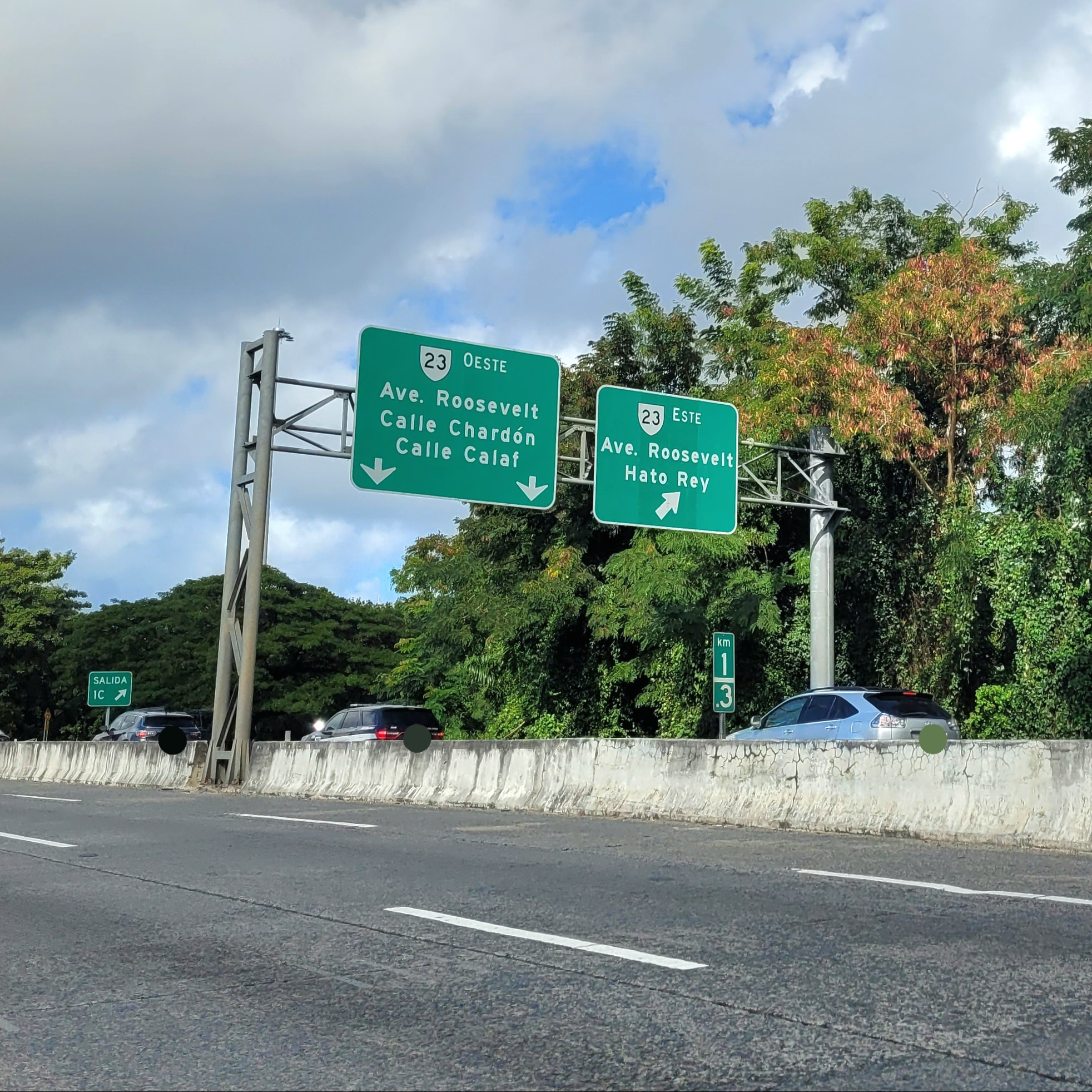
PR-18 north at its exits to PR-23

=== Transportation ===
The Roosevelt station of the Tren Urbano is the only station that stops on the avenue. The other station, Hato Rey, stops just a mile ahead due north, at the beginning of the Golden Mile.

The AMA has a bus connection stop at the corner of Roosevelt with Ponce de León Avenue (PR-25), and Roosevelt with Muñoz Rivera Avenue (PR-1), just south of the Golden Mile. The AMA route A-3 stops at this connection, and then returns to Roosevelt Avenue from Plaza Las Américas until the end of the avenue. The A-3 does not runs Roosevelt Avenue from the Muñoz Rivera Avenue to the intersection with Plaza Las Américas Avenue, that's the job for the AMA route B-22 who runs all the Roosevelt Avenue. The AMA route M-2 (Metrobus 2) runs Roosevelt Avenue until the intersection of Muñoz Rivera Avenue.

=== Neighborhoods ===
- San Patricio Plaza
- Puerto Nuevo
- Plaza
- Eleanor Roosevelt
- Milla de Oro (Golden Mile)
- Floral Park
- Martín Peña
- El Vedado
- Fomento

=== Landmarks ===
- Plaza Las Américas
- Roosevelt Station
- Hiram Bithorn Stadium
- Roberto Clemente Coliseum
- Triple S Plaza
- Puerto Rico Police Department Headquarters
- WKAQ-TV
- WKAQ-FM

== Major intersections ==
Municipality	Location	km	mi	Destinations	Notes
Guaynabo	Pueblo Viejo	0.0	0.0	PR-165 north (Avenida El Caño) – Cataño	Continuation beyond PR-2
Guaynabo	Pueblo Viejo	0.0	0.0	PR-2 (Expreso John F. Kennedy) / PR-165 – Guaynabo, Bayamón, San Juan	Western terminus of PR-23 and northern terminus of PR-165
Guaynabo	Pueblo Viejo	0.2	0.12	PR-Avenida San Patricio – Guaynabo	
San Juan	Gobernador Piñero	1.8– 1.9	1.1– 1.2	PR-Avenida José de Diego – Puerto Nuevo	
San Juan	Gobernador Piñero	2.8– 2.9	1.7– 1.8	PR-Avenida Andalucía / PR-Calle 25 NE – Puerto Nuevo	
San Juan	Hato Rey Norte	3.5	2.2	PR-Avenida Plaza Las Américas – Plaza Las Américas	
San Juan	Hato Rey Norte	3.9	2.4	PR-18 (Expreso Las Américas) – San Juan, Bayamón, Caguas, Ponce	PR-18 exits 3A, 3B and 3C; cloverleaf interchange
San Juan	Hato Rey Norte	4.3	2.7	To PR-41 / PR-Calle César L. González – Hato Rey	
San Juan	Hato Rey Norte	5.3	3.3	PR-1 south (Avenida Luis Muñoz Rivera) – Río Piedras	One-way street
San Juan	Hato Rey Norte–Hato Rey Central line	5.4	3.4	PR-25 north (Avenida Juan Ponce de León) – San Juan, Santurce	One-way street
San Juan	Hato Rey Central–Oriente line	6.4	4.0	PR-27 (Avenida José Celso Barbosa) – Santurce, Río Piedras	Eastern terminus of PR-23
1.000 mi = 1.609 km; 1.000 km = 0.621 mi

== See also ==
- Franklin D. Roosevelt
