= Hato Rey Norte =

Barrio of San Juan, Puerto Rico

- Barrio
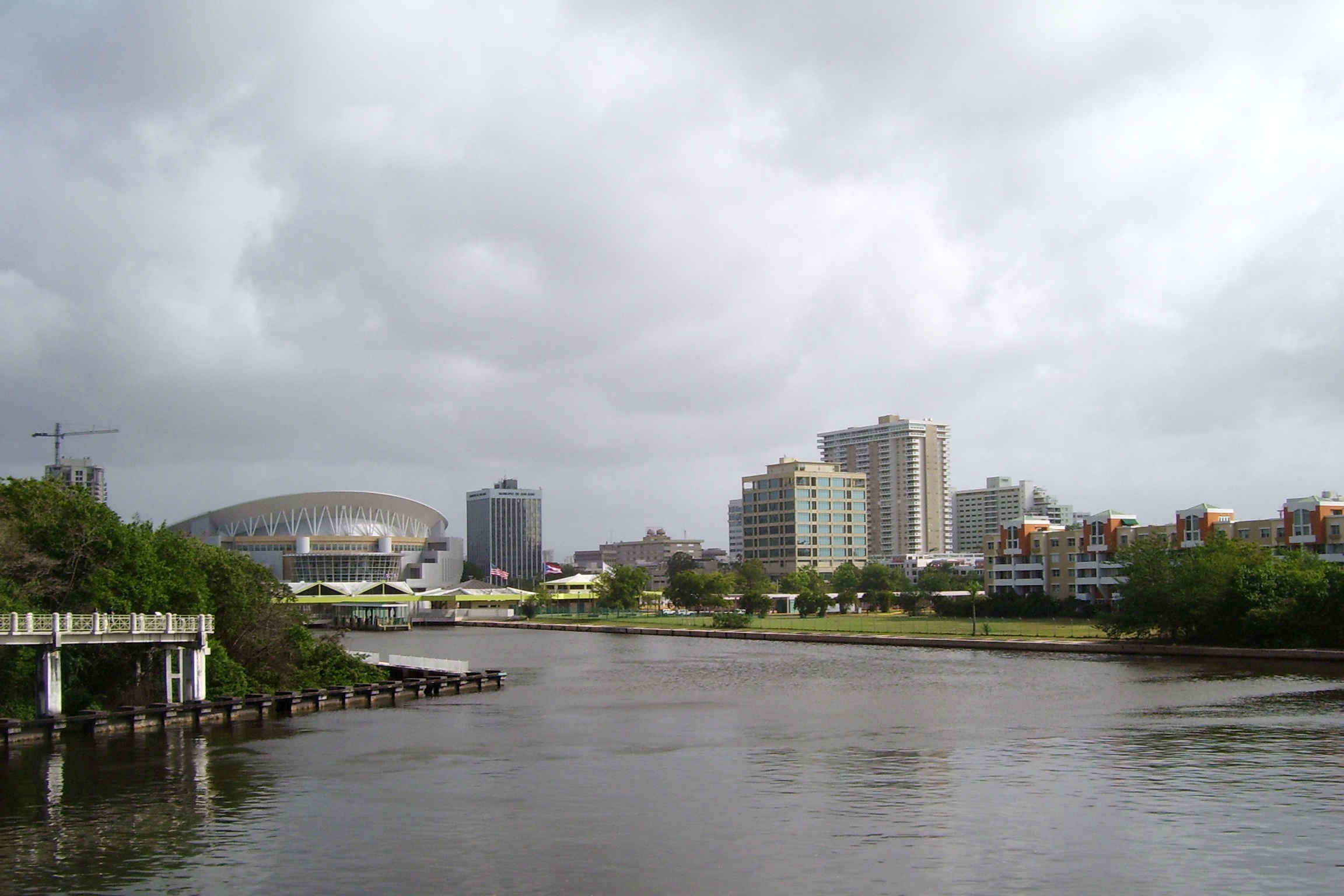
- Hato Rey Norte skyline, with Martín Peña Canal and José Miguel Agrelot Coliseum

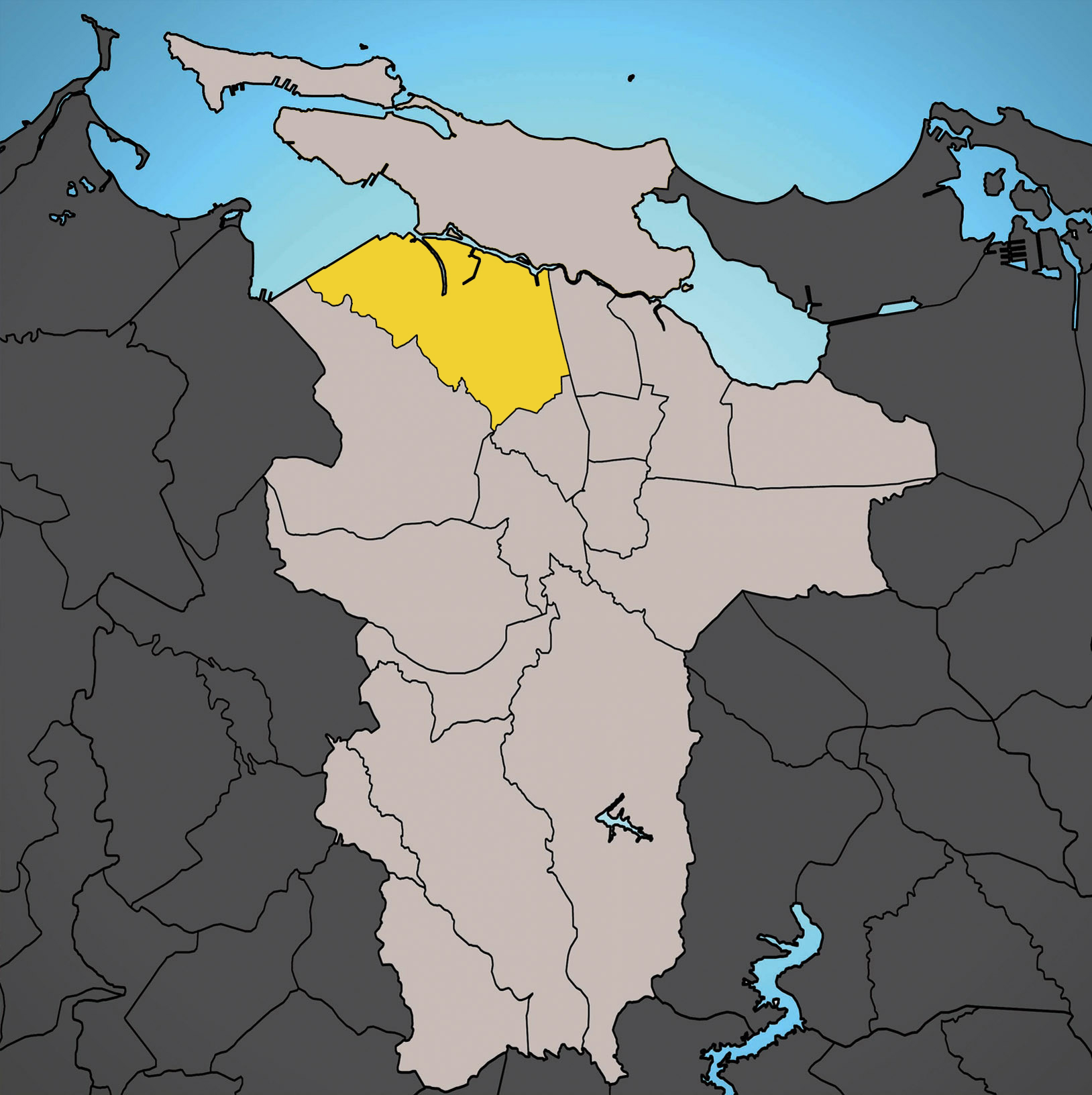
- Location of Hato Rey Norte shown in yellow
- Coordinates: 18°25′26″N 66°04′58″W
- Commonwealth: Puerto Rico
- Municipality: San Juan

Area
  - Total: 4.33 sq mi (11.2 km^{2})
  - Land: 3.57 sq mi (9.2 km^{2})
  - Water: 0.76 sq mi (2.0 km^{2})
- Elevation: 0 ft (0 m)

Population (2010)
  - Total: 16,378
  - Density: 4,639.7/sq mi (1,791.4/km^{2})
- 2010 census

Hato Rey Norte is one of the 18 barrios of the municipality of San Juan, Puerto Rico. It is one of three barrios commonly known together as Hato Rey. Hato Rey Norte was part of the former municipality of Rio Piedras, before it was merged with the municipality of San Juan in 1951.

It is bounded by Hato Rey Central to the east, the districts of Gobernador Piñero and Hato Rey Sur to the south, and by Santurce to the north. The Caño Martín Peña separates Hato Rey Norte from Santurce.

== Demographics ==
Historical population
Census	Pop.	Note	%±
1950	8,282		—
1960	18,658		125.3%
1970	18,525		−0.7%
1980	15,909		−14.1%
1990	16,002		0.6%
2000	16,461		2.9%
2010	16,378		−0.5%
U.S. Decennial Census; 1900 (N/A) 1910-1930; 1930-1950 1980-2000 2010

The population of this barrio is of 16,378 residents with a population density of 4,640 residents per square mile.

== Subbarrios ==
The barrio of Hato Rey Norte is further subdivided into four subbarrios.

- El Vedado
- Eleanor Roosevelt
- Martín Peña
- Puerto Nuevo

== Landmarks and places of interest ==
- Banco Popular Center and Caribbean Cinema's Fine Arts Café.
- FBI San Juan Field Office and Degetau Federal Building.
- Hiram Bithorn Stadium, a baseball park listed in the National Register of Historic Places.
- José Miguel Agrelot Coliseum, popularly known as the Choliseo, a basketball arena and San Juan's main concert venue.
- Martín Peña Channel and boardwalk or lineal park (eastern end).
- Milla de Oro, the central business district of San Juan.
- Plaza Las Américas, the largest shopping mall in the Caribbean.
- Puerto Rico Police Department Headquarters.
- Roberto Clemente Coliseum, an indoor arena and concert venue.
- United States Federal Court for the District of Puerto Rico.

== Transportation ==
Hato Rey Norte is part of the Milla de Oro and San Juan central business district, served by the Domenech, Roosevelt and Hato Rey metro stations. The area is also served by the Martín Peña Channel ferry, and the district is also considered a hub for the Metropolitan Bus Authority (AMA).

== Gallery ==
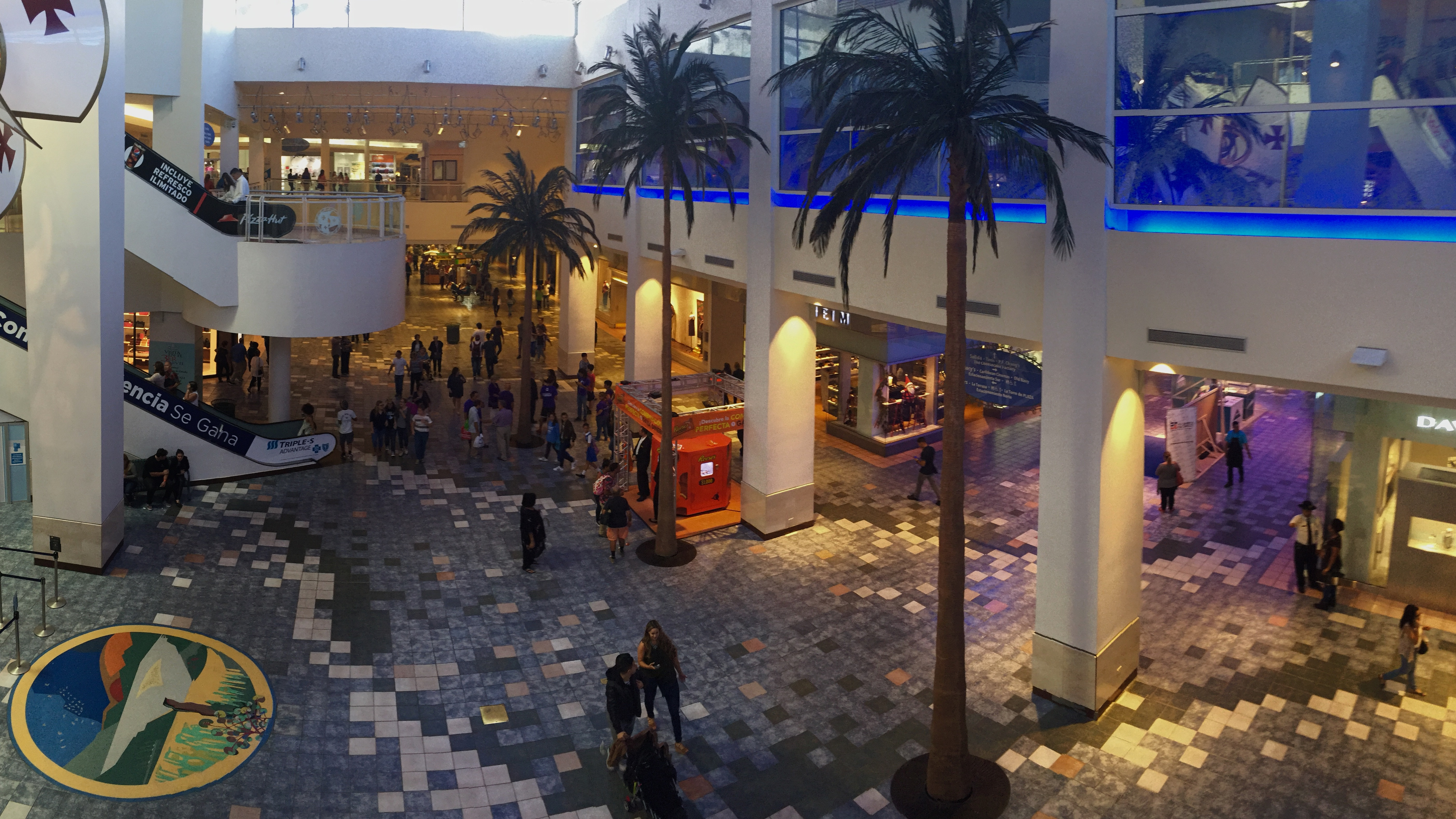
Plaza Las Americas

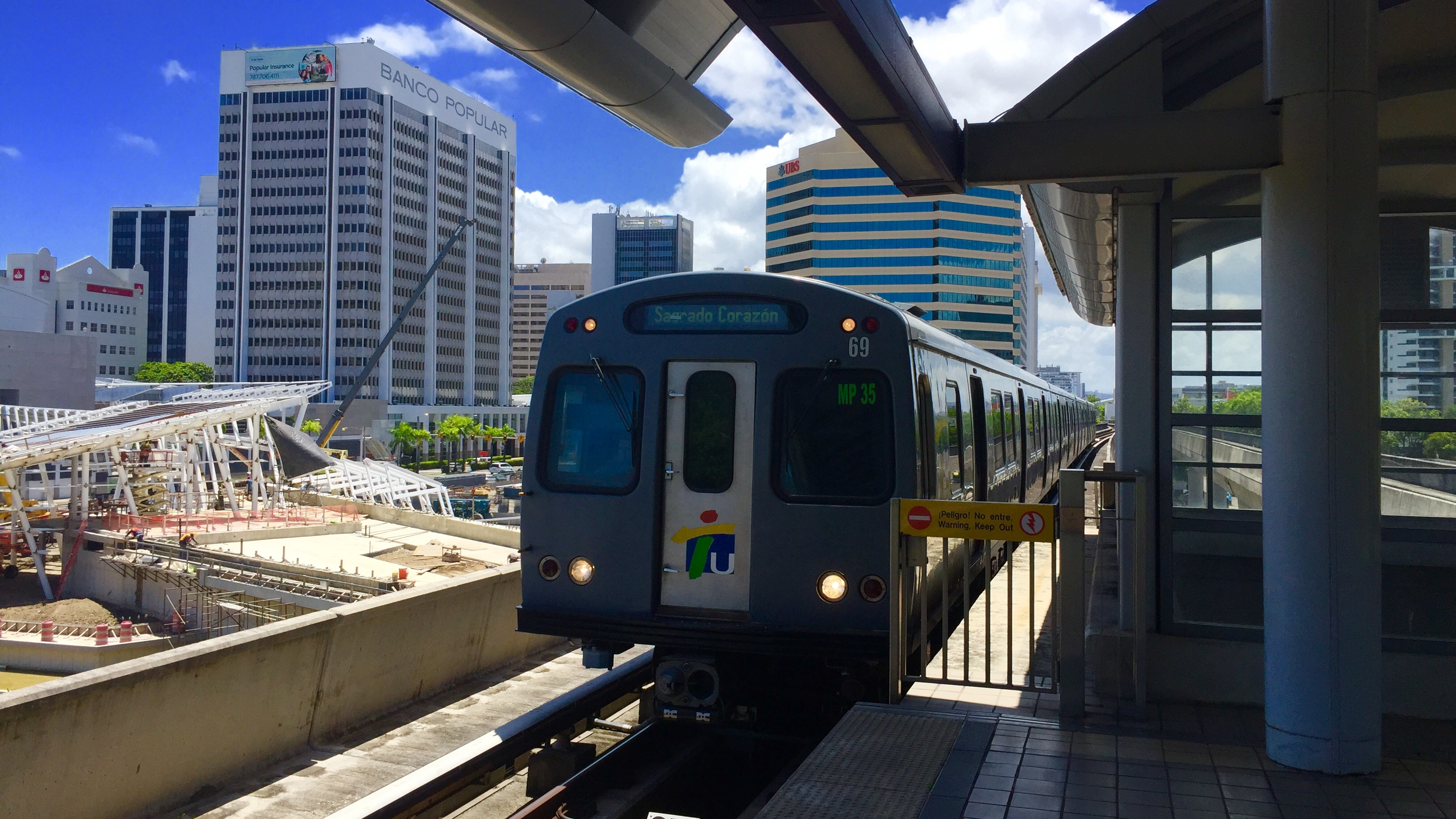
Hato Rey Station

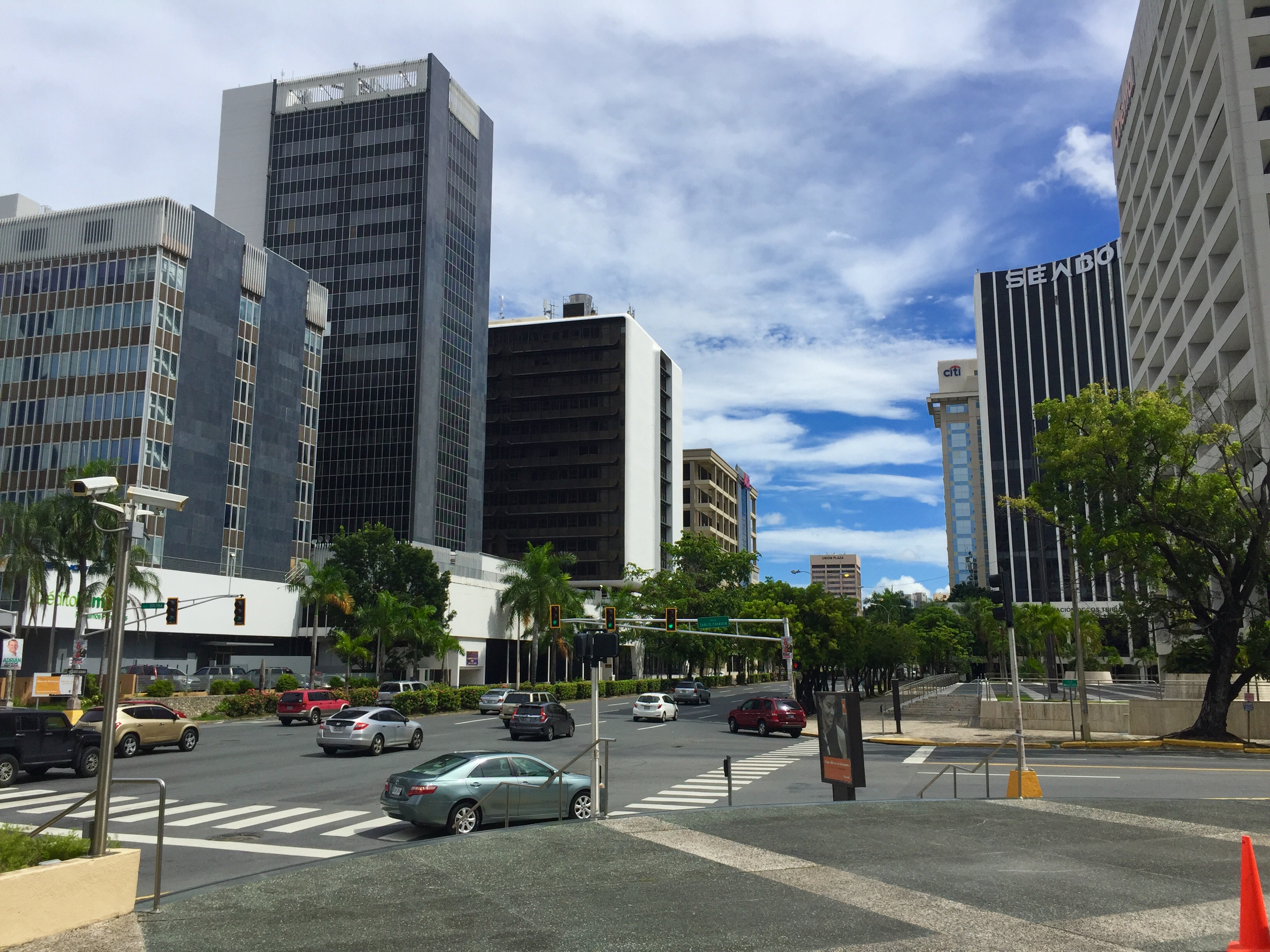
Luis Muñoz Rivera Avenue at the Milla de Oro.

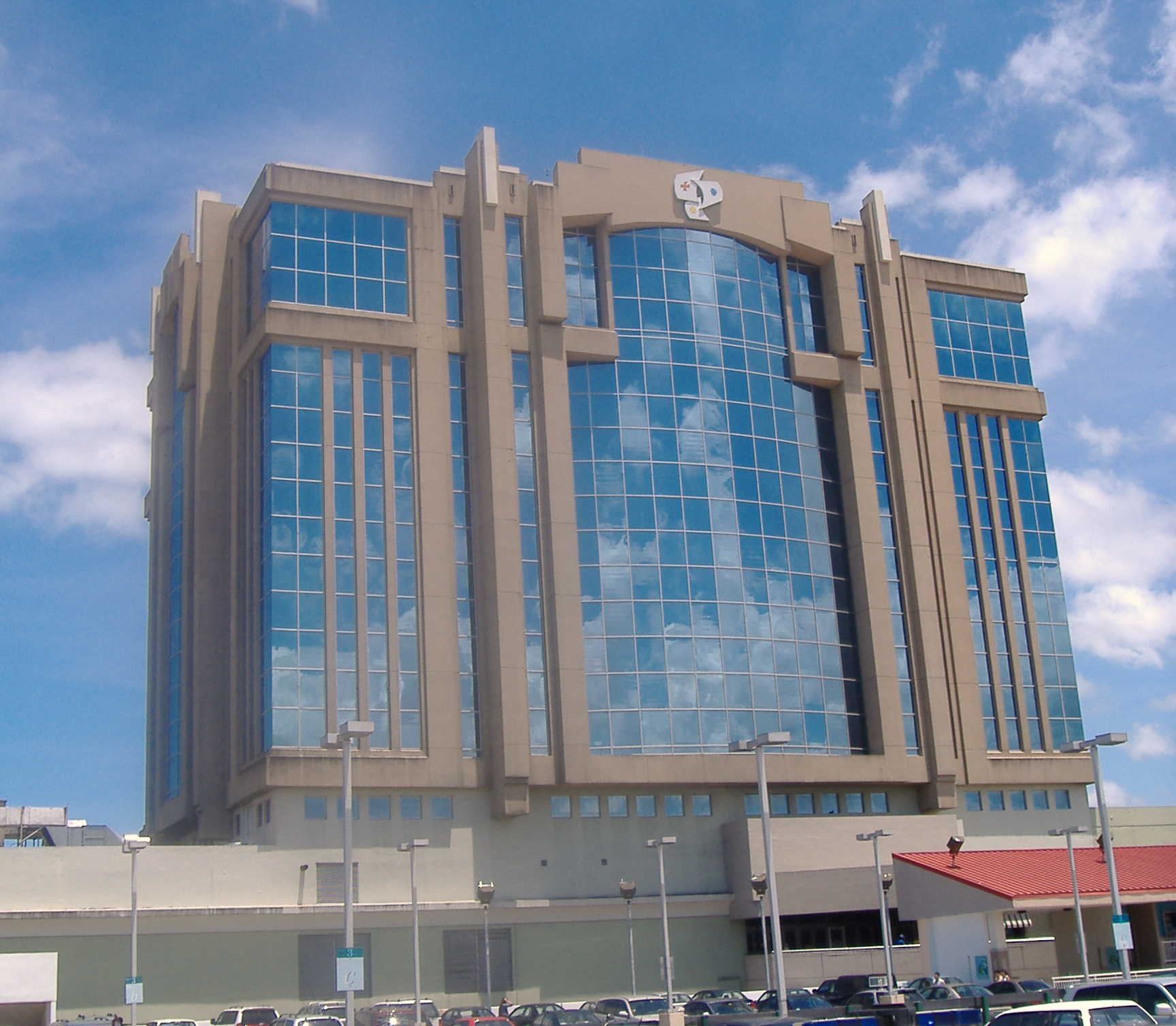
Plaza Las Americas Tower

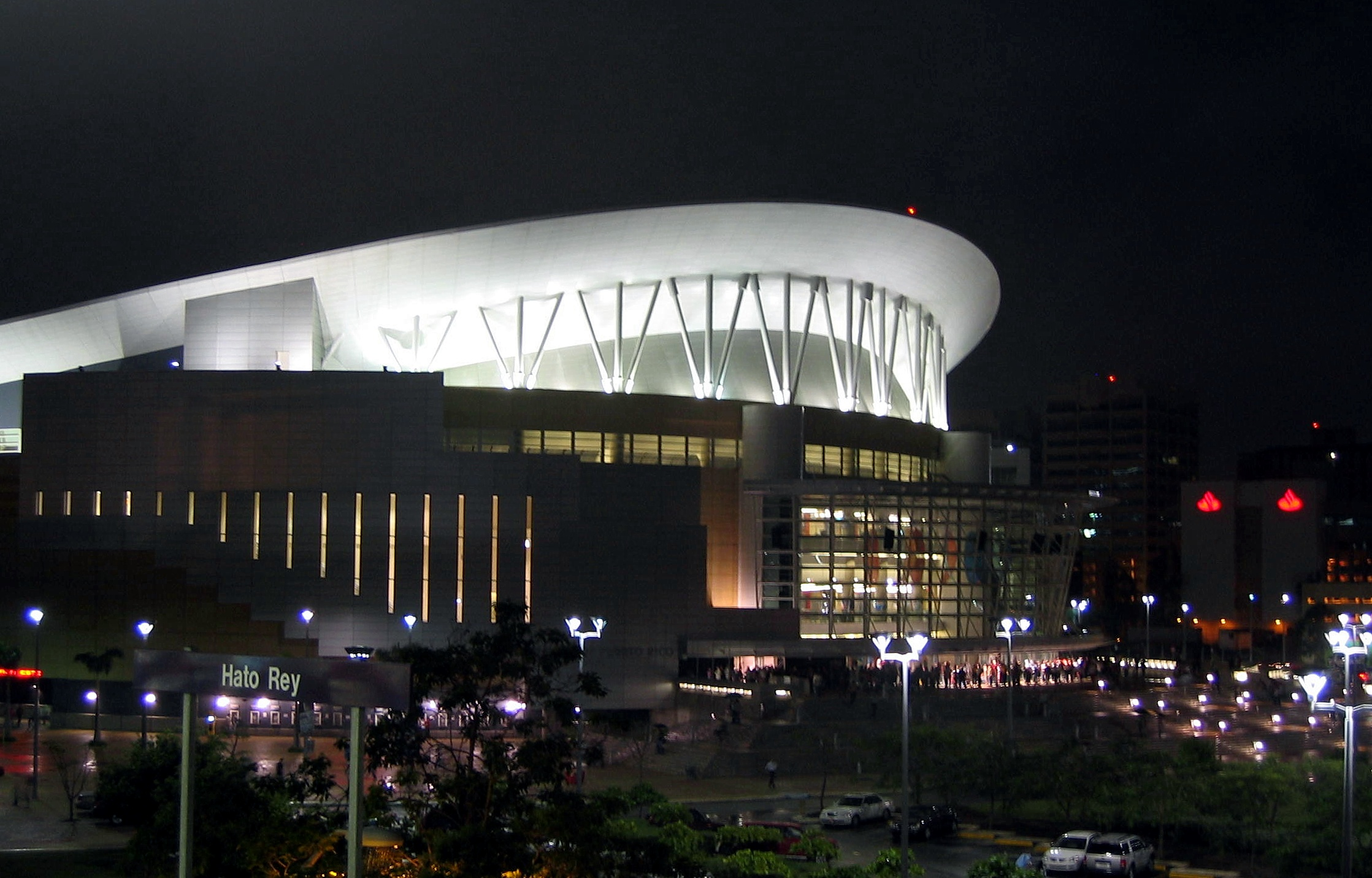
Jose Miguel Agrelot Coliseum ("Choliseo")

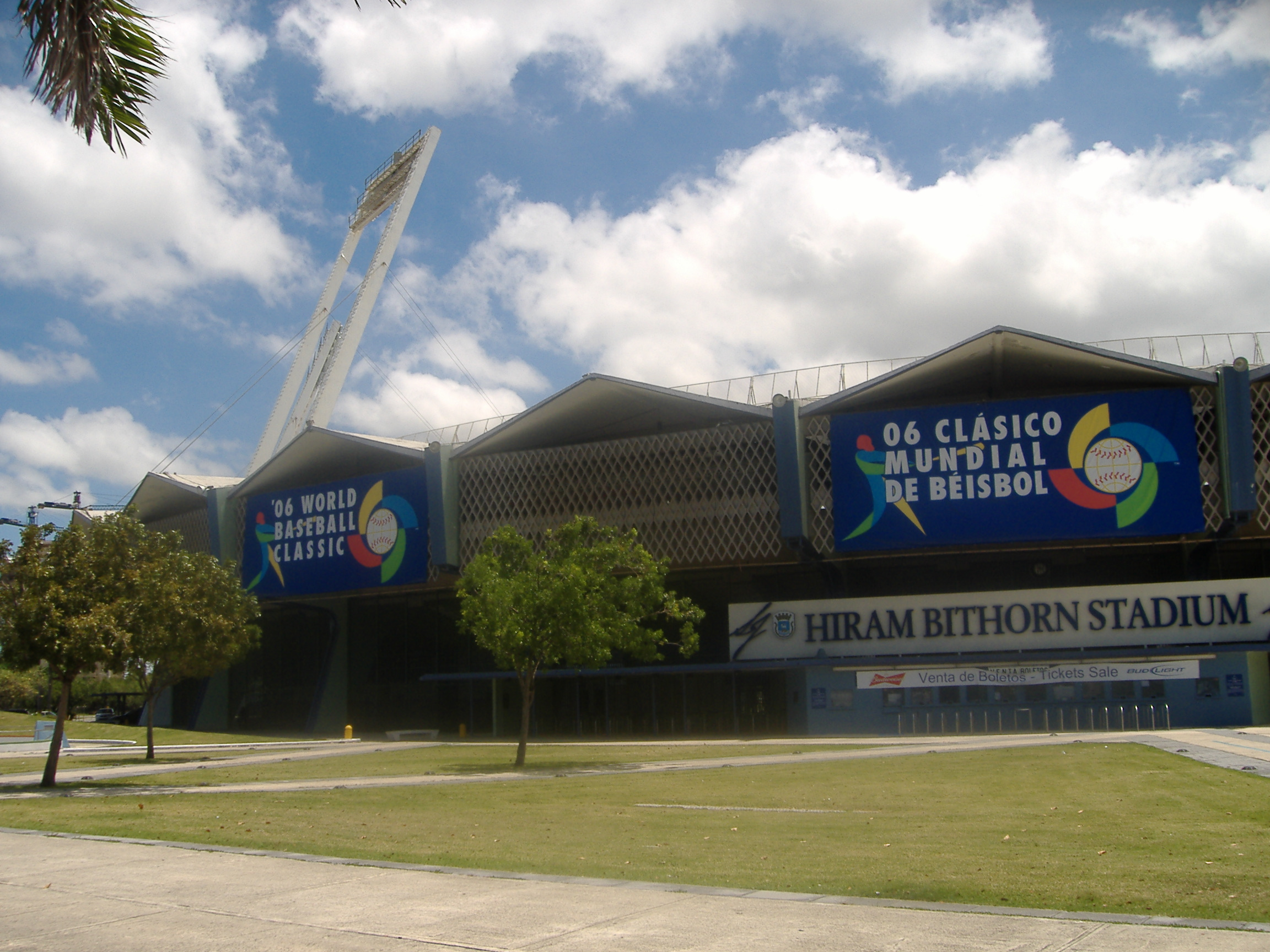
Hiram Bithorn Stadium

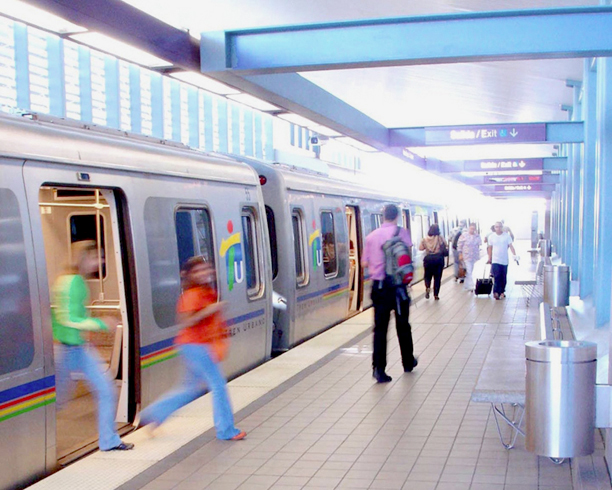
Roosevelt Station

== See also ==
- Hato Rey
- List of communities in Puerto Rico
