= List of Tren Urbano stations =

Tren Urbano mass transit stations in San Juan, Guaynabo and Bayamón in Puerto Rico

The Department of Transportation and Public Works of Puerto Rico operates the Tren Urbano mass transit network, serving the municipalities of San Juan, Guaynabo and Bayamón. As of 2011, the single 10.7-mile (17.2 km) line includes 16 stations. They serve about 40,900 passengers a day, making the Tren Urbano the twelfth-largest rapid transit system in the United States in terms of ridership.

== Stations ==
†	Terminal stations

Station	Lines	Jurisdiction	Opened	Reference
Bayamón†	Tren Urbano	Bayamón	December 17, 2004	
Centro Médico	Tren Urbano	San Juan	December 17, 2004	
Cupey	Tren Urbano	San Juan	December 17, 2004	
Deportivo	Tren Urbano	Bayamón	December 17, 2004	
Domenech	Tren Urbano	San Juan	December 17, 2004	
Hato Rey	Tren Urbano	San Juan	December 17, 2004	
Jardines	Tren Urbano	Guaynabo	December 17, 2004	
Las Lomas	Tren Urbano	San Juan	December 17, 2004	
Martínez Nadal	Tren Urbano	Guaynabo	December 17, 2004	
Piñero	Tren Urbano	San Juan	December 17, 2004	
Roosevelt	Tren Urbano	San Juan	December 17, 2004	
Río Piedras	Tren Urbano	San Juan	December 17, 2004	
Sagrado Corazón†	Tren Urbano	San Juan	December 17, 2004	
San Francisco	Tren Urbano	San Juan	December 17, 2004	
Torrimar	Tren Urbano	Guaynabo	December 17, 2004	
Universidad	Tren Urbano	San Juan	December 17, 2004	
