= Domenech station =

Rail station of the Tren Urbano system in San Juan, Puerto Rico

Domenech
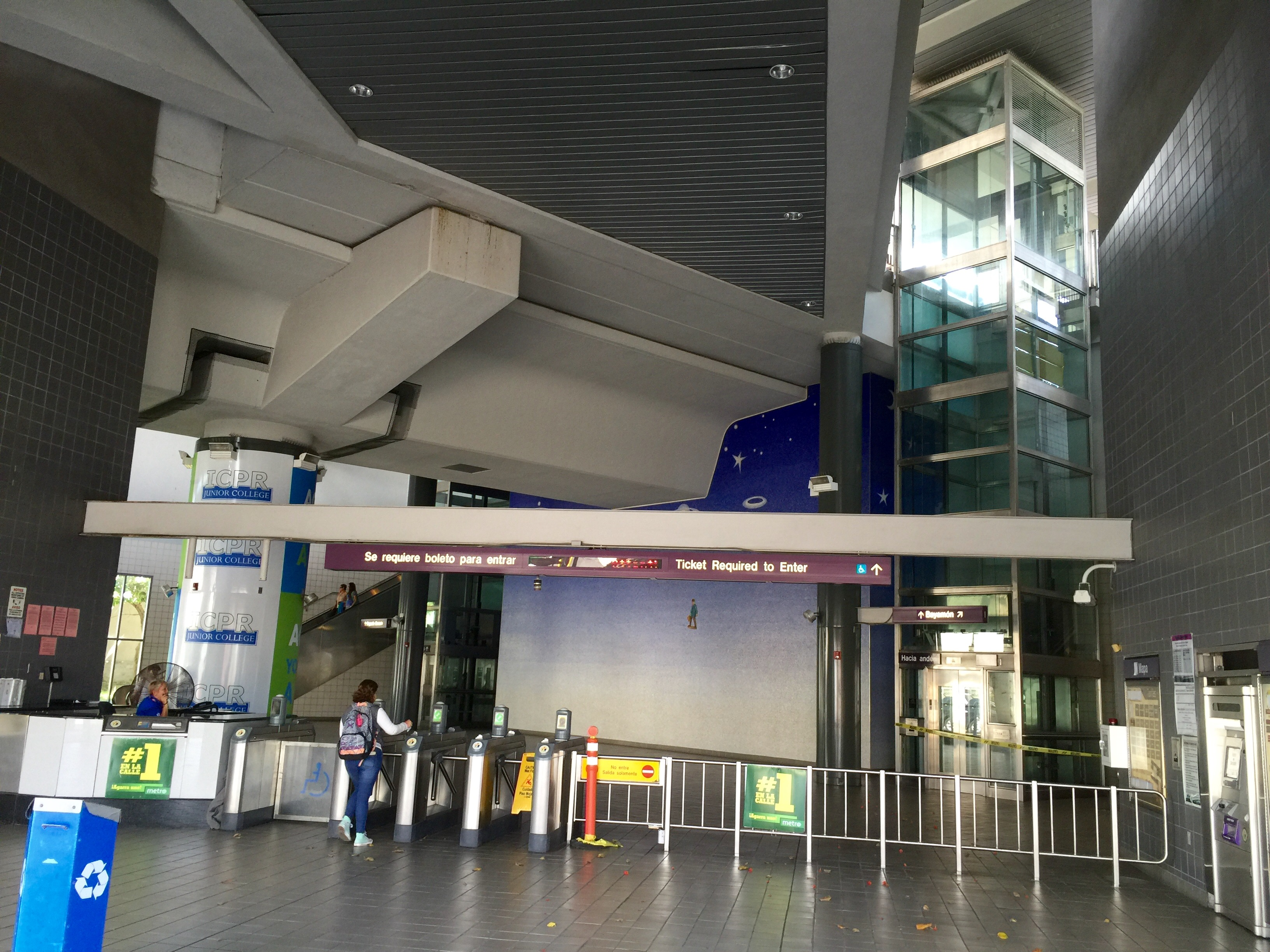

General information
- Location: Calle Guayama; San Juan, Puerto Rico
- Coordinates: 18.415445°N 66.05625°W
- Owner: Puerto Rico Department of Transportation and Public Works
- Operator: Alternate Concepts
- Platforms: 2 side platform
- Tracks: 2

Construction
- Structure type: Elevated
- Accessible: Yes

History
- Opened: December 17, 2004; 21 years ago

Services
Preceding station	Tren Urbano	Following station
Piñero toward Bayamón	Tren Urbano	Roosevelt toward Sagrado Corazón
Location

Domenech is a rapid transit station in San Juan, Puerto Rico, located in the Hato Rey Central district close to the Milla de Oro financial district. The station is named after the Manuel Domenech Avenue where it is located. The station opened on December 17, 2004. It features a tile mural by the artist Liliana Porter titled El Viajero.

== Nearby ==
- Puerto Rico Department of Labor
- EDP University, Hato Rey Campus
- AEELA offices

== See also ==
- List of San Juan Tren Urbano stations
