= Hato Rey station =

Rail station in San Juan, Puerto Rico

Hato Rey
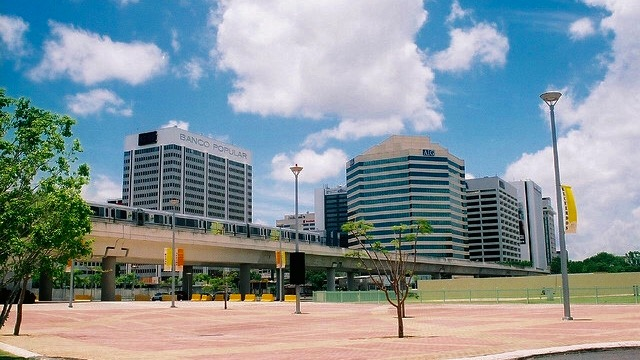

General information
- Location: Arterial B Street; San Juan, Puerto Rico
- Coordinates: 18.429138°N 66.060027°W
- Owner: Puerto Rico Department of Transportation and Public Works
- Operator: Alternate Concepts
- Platforms: 1 island platform
- Tracks: 2

Construction
- Structure type: Elevated
- Accessible: Yes

History
- Opened: December 17, 2004; 21 years ago

Services
| Preceding station | Tren Urbano | Following station |
|---|---|---|
| Roosevelt toward Bayamón | Tren Urbano | Sagrado Corazón Terminus |
Location

Hato Rey station is a rapid transit station in San Juan, Puerto Rico, located in Hato Rey Norte and Milla de Oro financial district. The station was designed by Segundo Cardona FAIA of SCF Architects. It opened on December 17, 2004. The station is located adjacent to the José Miguel Agrelot Coliseum (popularly known as the Choliseo).

== Extended operating hours ==
The Hato Rey station is the only station to extend operating hours after nighttime events end at the Choliseo until all passengers in line have entered the station. Late night-scheduled one-way trains run in both directions of the line only from the Hato Rey station. The Bayamón route train will stop at every station only to drop off passengers, instead of picking them up, and will continue the route until it reaches the end of the line. There is no service to and from other stations after-hours.

== Gallery ==
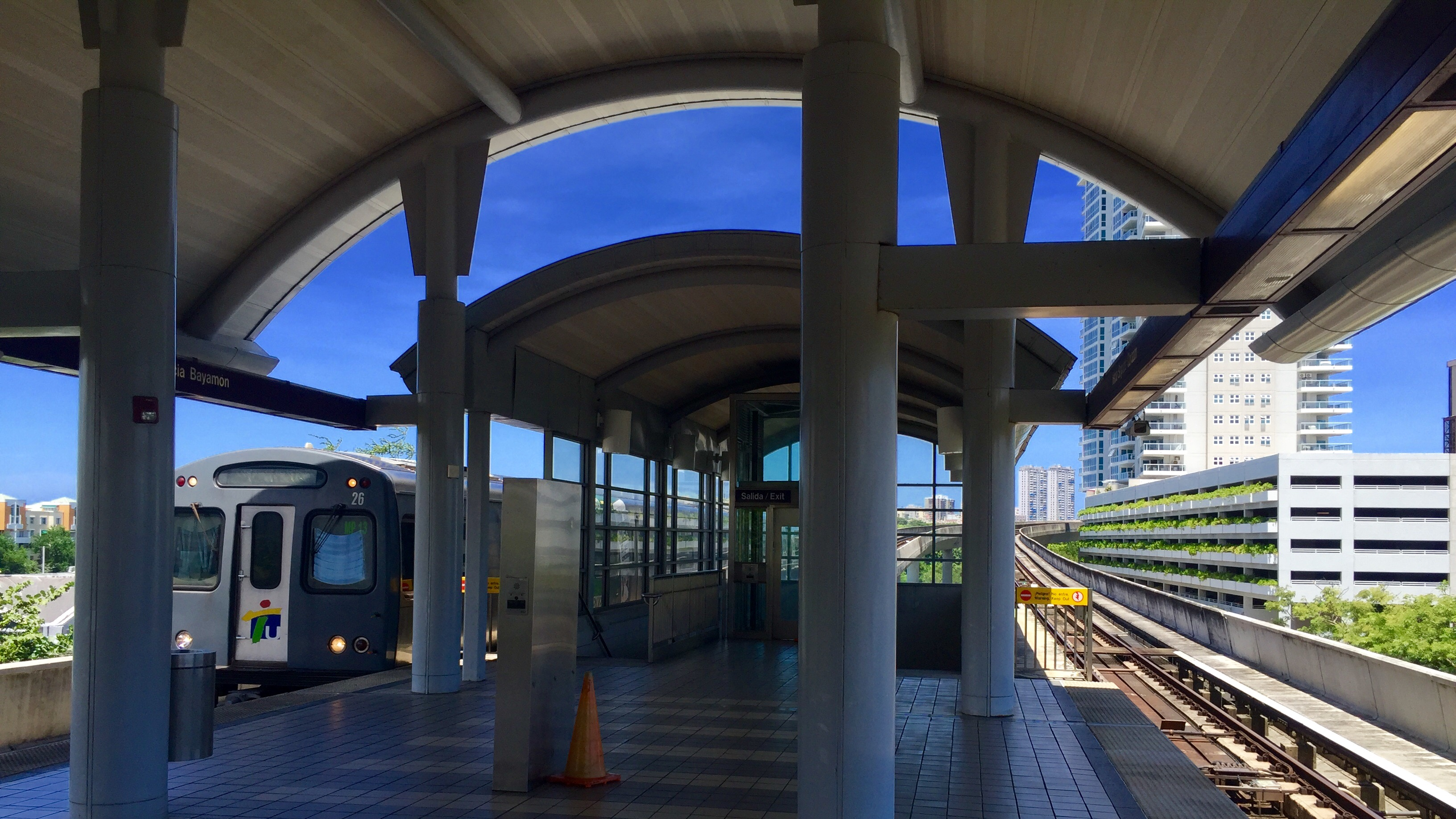
View of the station platform

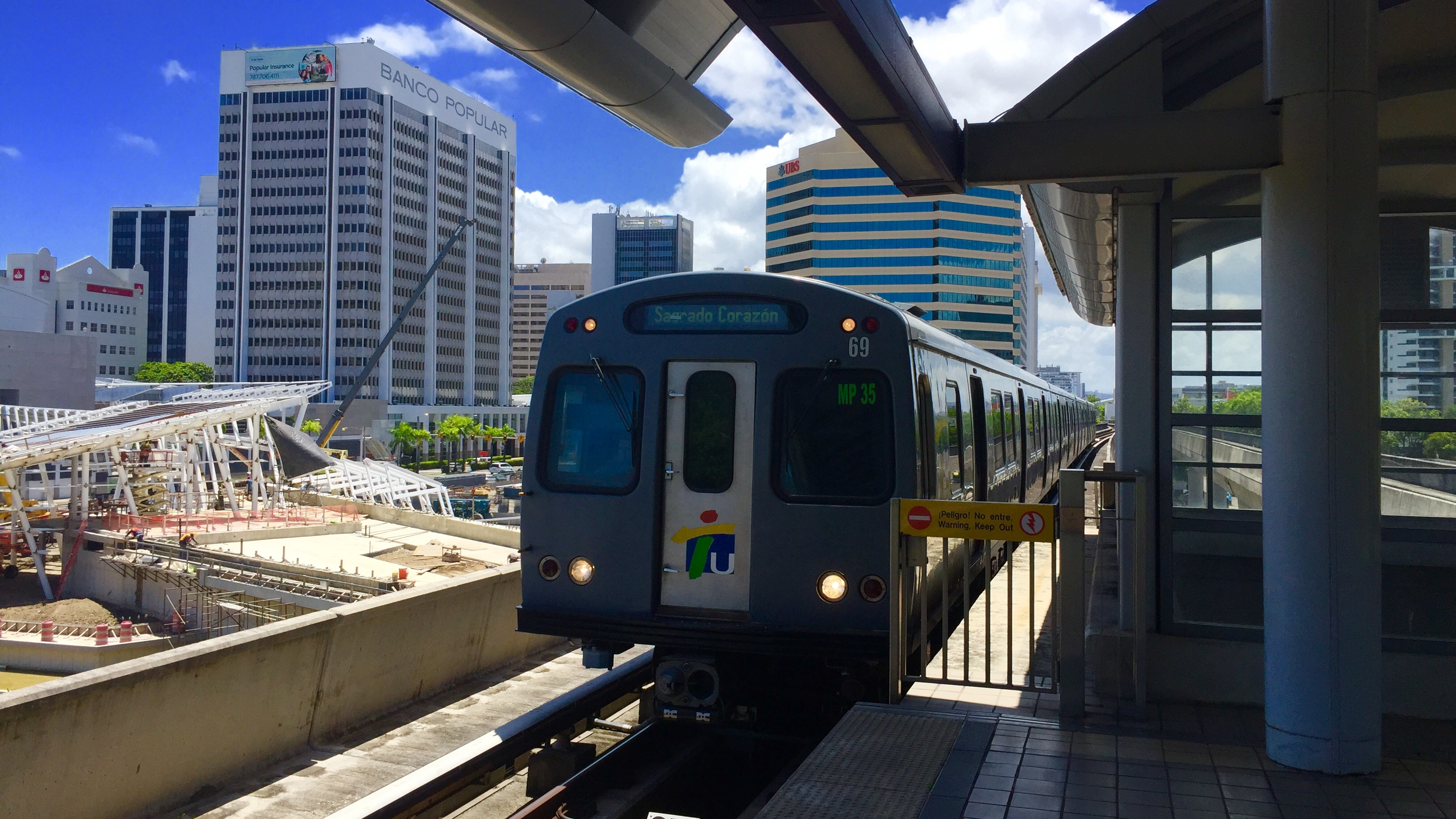
Popular Center and Milla de Oro seen from the platform

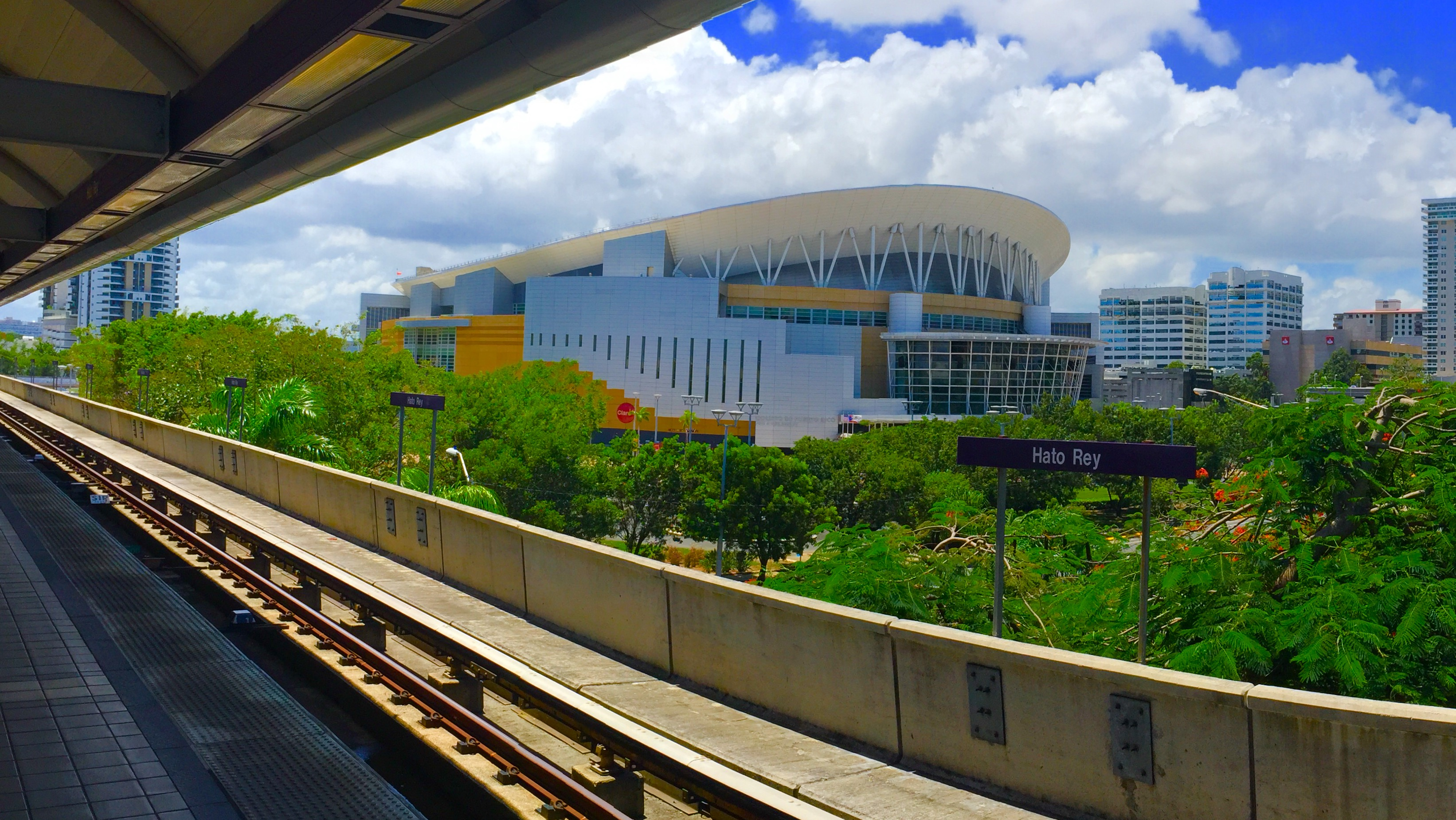
Choliseo from the platform

== See also ==
- List of San Juan Tren Urbano stations
