= José Miguel Agrelot Coliseum =

Indoor multipurpose venue in San Juan, Puerto Rico

José Miguel Agrelot Coliseum of Puerto Rico
- Coliseo de Puerto Rico José Miguel Agrelot
- Choliseo; Choli

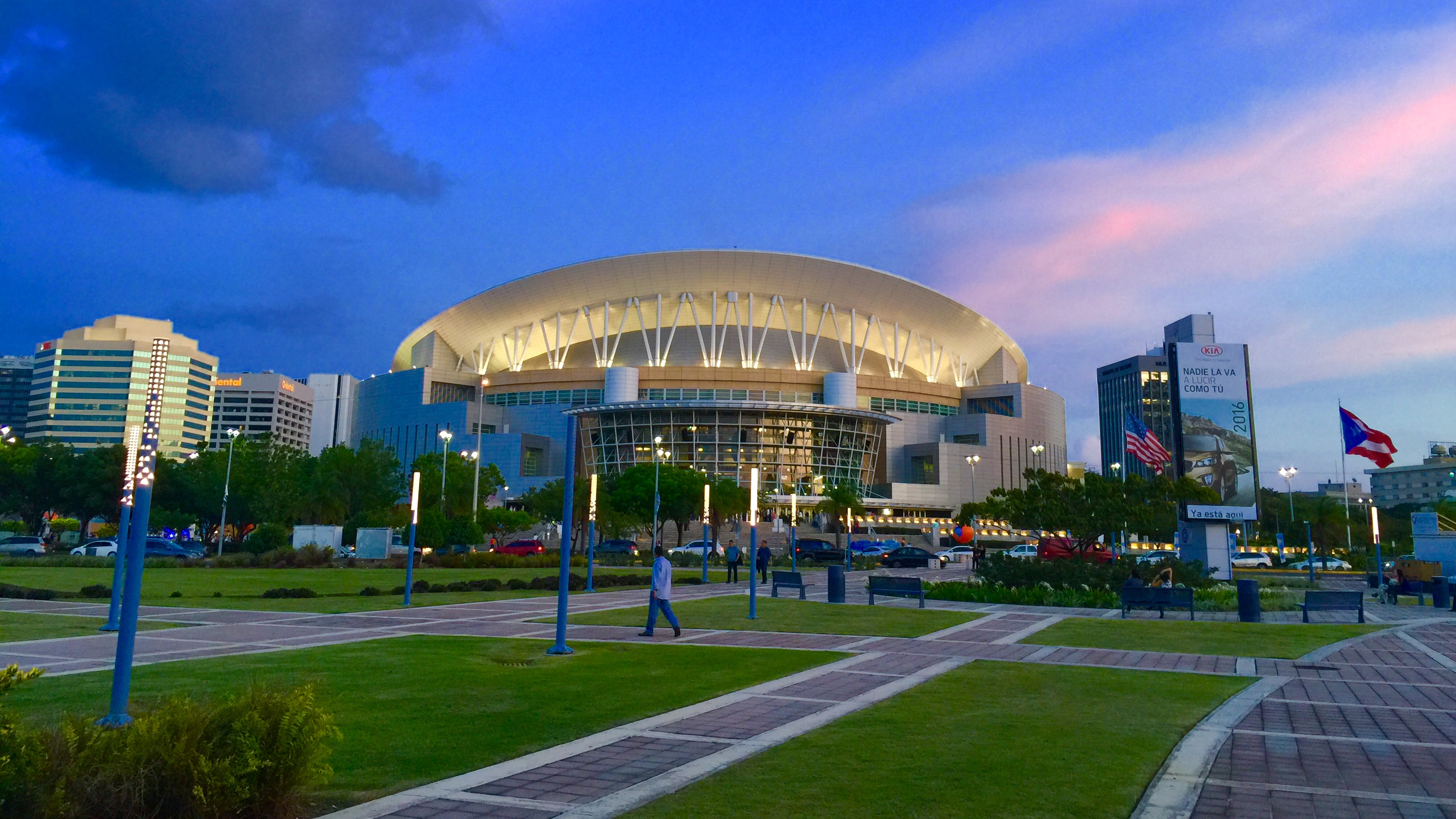
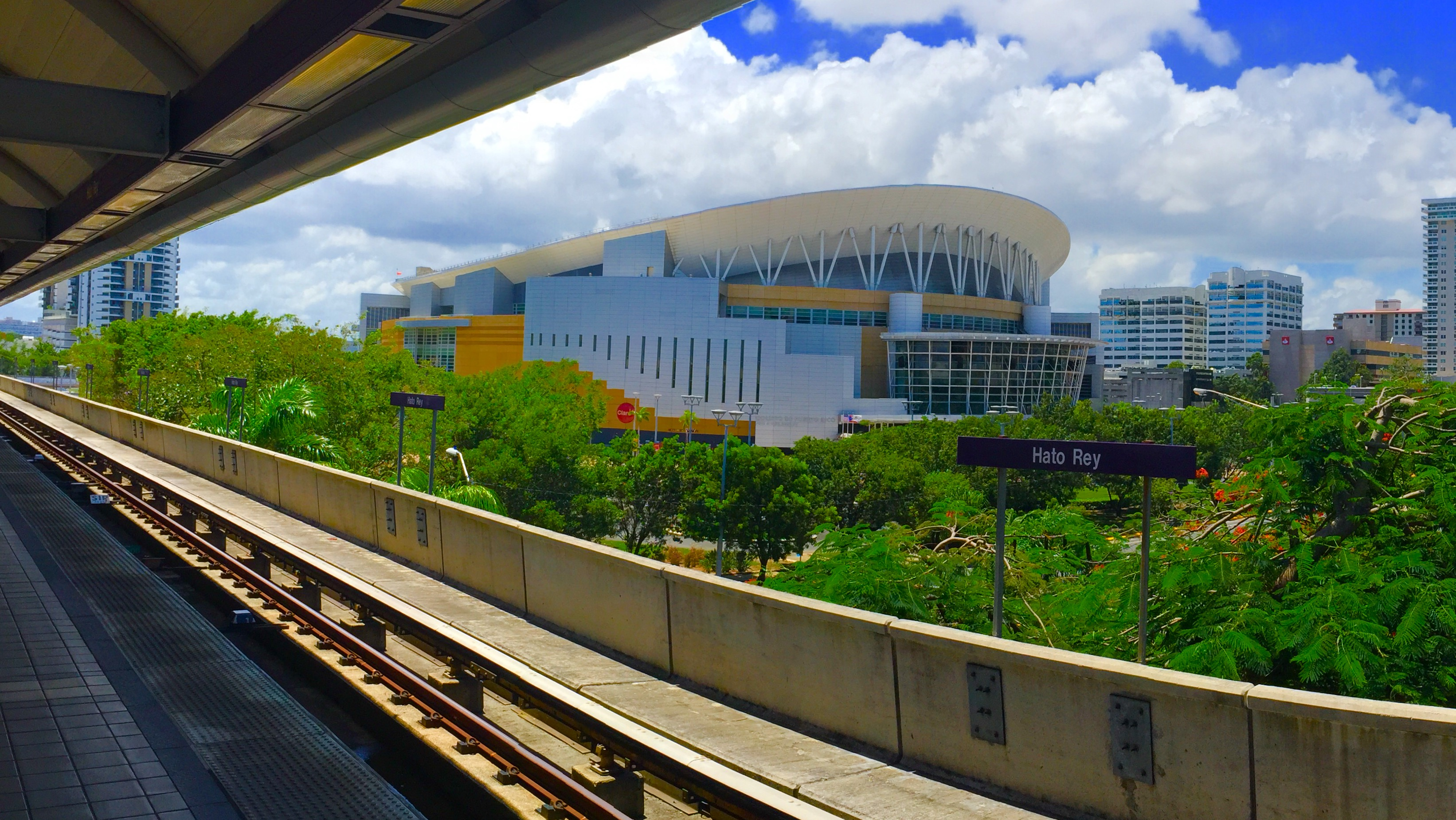
- Front (north) view of the Choliseo from the former Old San Juan-Hato Rey ferry terminal and side (east) view from the Hato Rey Station of the Urban Train, 2016
- Interactive map
- Full name: José Miguel Agrelot Coliseum of Puerto Rico
- Address: 500 Arterial B St.
- Location: Hato Rey, San Juan, Puerto Rico
- Coordinates: 18°25′39.78″N 66°3′41.01″W
- Owner: Puerto Rico Convention Center District Authority
- Operator: ASM Global
- Seating type: Reserved seating
- Capacity: 19,500
- Executive suites: 2 party suites 26 corporate suites
- Type: Arena
- Events: Music, concerts, sporting events
- Surface: Concrete
- Scoreboard: Four-sided LED
- Record attendance: 18,749 – Bad Bunny: Un Verano Sin Ti (July 28, 2022)
- Field shape: Oval rectangular
- Public transit: Hato Rey Station; AMA C1 C22 D15 T2; AcuaExpreso: Hato Rey Terminal

Construction
- Groundbreaking: 1998
- Built: July 1998–2004
- Opened: September 4, 2004
- Cost: US$252.6 million
- Architects: Sierra Cardona Ferrer; HOK
- Project manager: Government of Puerto Rico
- Structural engineer: QB Construction

Tenants
- Puerto Rico men's national basketball team Cangrejeros de Santurce (BSN) (2004–2011; 2021); Puerto Rico Tip-Off (NCAA) (2007–2011)

Website
- www.coliseodepuertorico.com

The José Miguel Agrelot Coliseum of Puerto Rico (Spanish: Coliseo de Puerto Rico José Miguel Agrelot) is the largest multi-purpose indoor arena in Puerto Rico since opening in 2004. Located in the Milla de Oro financial district of the Hato Rey business center in San Juan, the capital city and municipality of the archipelago and island, the venue is popularly known as the Choliseo (often shortened as Choli), which is a portmanteau of the words coliseo (coliseum) and "Cholito," a reference to Don Cholito, a character created by the eponymous comedian José Miguel Agrelot and his own adopted nickname. It has a maximum capacity of 19,500 spectators, making it the biggest indoor arena in the insular Caribbean, 9th in Latin America, 17th in the United States, and 38th in the world.

The José Miguel Agrelot Coliseum of Puerto Rico has consistently been ranked among the highest ticket-selling and grossing venues globally. With 743,983 ticket sales and $51,585,340 grosses in the fiscal year of 2023, the arena ranked 23rd in tickets and 42nd in revenue out of 200 venues worldwide listed by Pollstar, making it the 3rd highest-ticket-selling and 2nd highest-grossing arena in Latin America. In the fiscal year of 2023, the Choliseo recorded $7.5 million in net income, the highest in a given year since its opening in 2004. In July 2022, the arena saw its largest attendance during Bad Bunny's World's Hottest Tour for the Un Verano Sin Ti album, with a record of 18,749 spectators. As of 2022, the Choliseo has received over 10 million spectators.

The arena is owned by the Puerto Rico Convention District Authority, a public corporation of Puerto Rico, and managed by ASM Global. Situated about 3 to 6 miles (4.8 to 9.7 km) from the Old San Juan historic quarter, Condado and Isla Verde resort areas, and SJU airport, it can be reached by public transport via the Hato Rey Station of the Tren Urbano and the Puerto Rico Metropolitan Bus Authority from nearby stops.

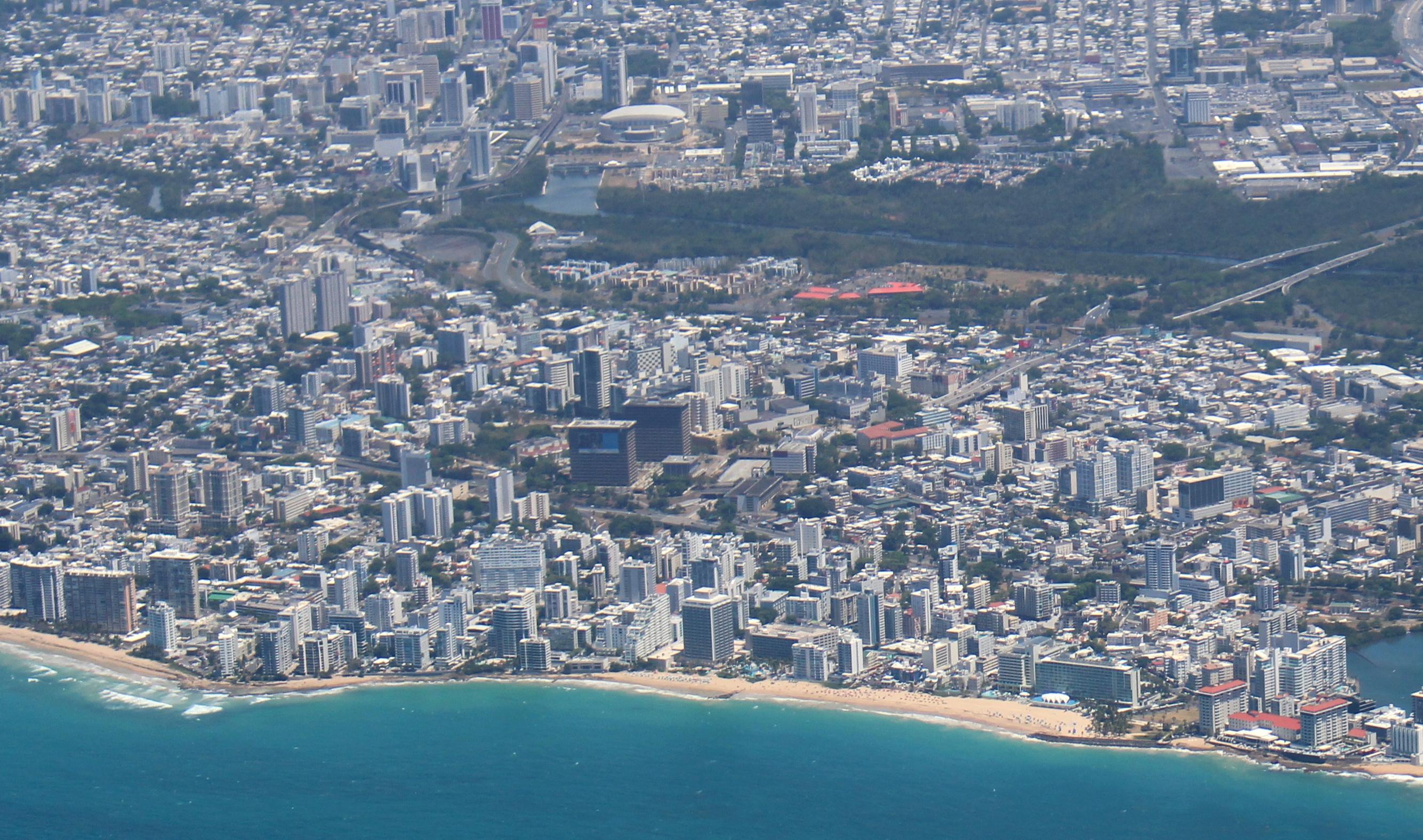
Aerial view of Condado resort area (foreground) in Santurce barrio to Milla de Oro financial district (background) in Hato Rey barrio with the Choliseo visible (oval structure in center background), 2022

== Name ==
The official name of the arena is the Coliseo de Puerto Rico José Miguel Agrelot (English: José Miguel Agrelot Coliseum of Puerto Rico). However, the venue is locally most commonly known as the Choliseo (often shortened as Choli), which is a portmanteau of the words coliseo (coliseum) and "Cholito", a reference to Don Cholito, a character created by the eponymous Puerto Rican comedian José Miguel Agrelot and his own adopted nickname.

During the construction phase, plans called for the coliseum to be named simply El Coliseo de Puerto Rico (The Coliseum of Puerto Rico). It was also suggested to have a private entity sponsor the facility and lend its name to it. Most local politicians objected to the idea, due to the 2001 Enron financial scandal, which made the company go bankrupt at a time when their corporate sponsorship named the Houston Astros' home ballpark as the Enron Field.

Legislators argued over the naming of the Coliseum after a celebrity from Puerto Rico. Some of the names mentioned were that of pop star Chayanne, boxer Félix "Tito" Trinidad and actor Raúl Juliá. Puerto Rican law demanded that no facility could be named after a living individual, but there were talks of making an exception to the law should a living Puerto Rican icon be honored with the name. However, the name of beloved local comedian José Miguel Agrelot was chosen in 2004, the same year of his death, when the Coliseum was near its completion. Agrelot himself had suggested the name of composer Rafael Hernández Marín to be used, and when someone suggested his name instead, he was surprised.

== History ==
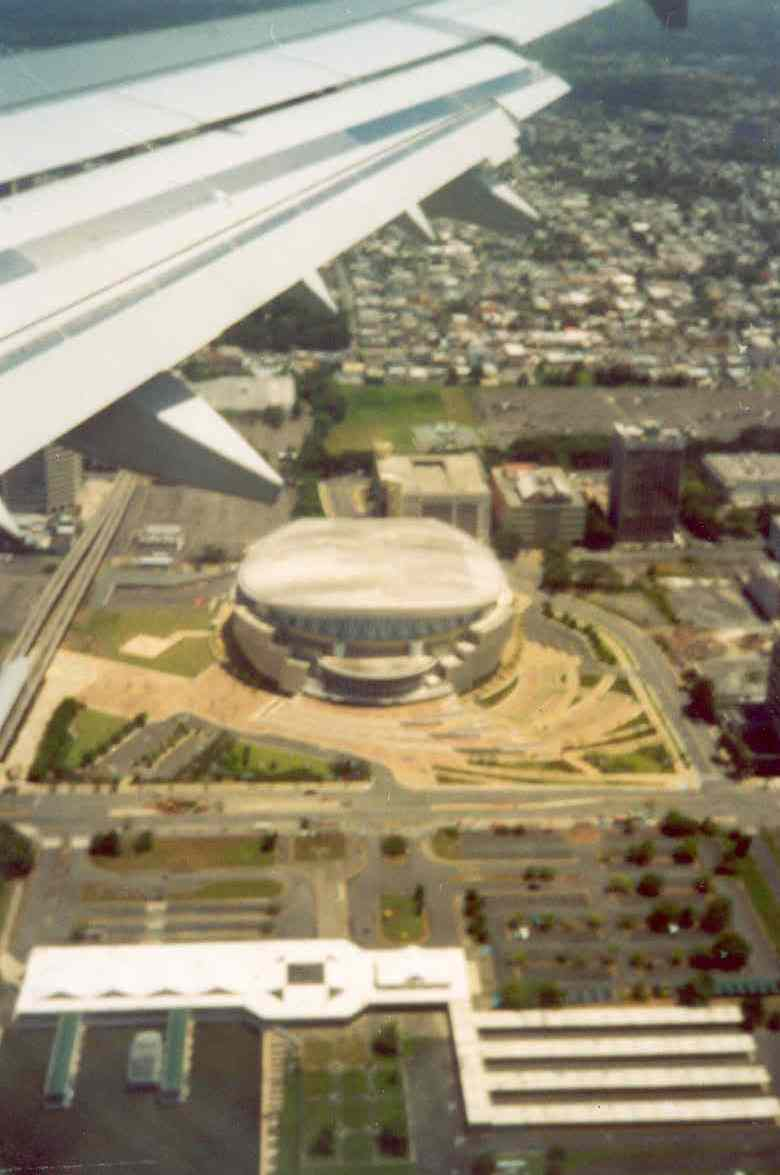
Aerial view of the Choliseo, 2005

=== Construction ===
From 1992 to 1995, the construction of the Coliseum of Puerto Rico was first introduced during the administrations of Governors Rafael Hernández Colón and Pedro Rosselló as part of the unsuccessful bid of the capital municipality of San Juan to host the 2004 Olympic Games. The facility was to be built in Hato Rey, the central business district of Puerto Rico in San Juan, in the same complex where the Roberto Clemente Coliseum and the Hiram Bithorn Stadium are located, which is about 1.75 miles (2.82 km) west from the current site of the arena.

==== Rosselló administration ====
The first construction plan for the Coliseum was introduced by the Rosselló administration in 1996. When the International Olympic Committee selected Athens to host the Olympics in 1997, the administration decided to start the construction of the Coliseum at a nearby site in the Milla de Oro financial district of Hato Rey in 1998. As the new location was adjacent to the then-planned Hato Rey Station of the Tren Urbano station, no parking facilities for the arena were initially designed to induce visitors to use public transportation.

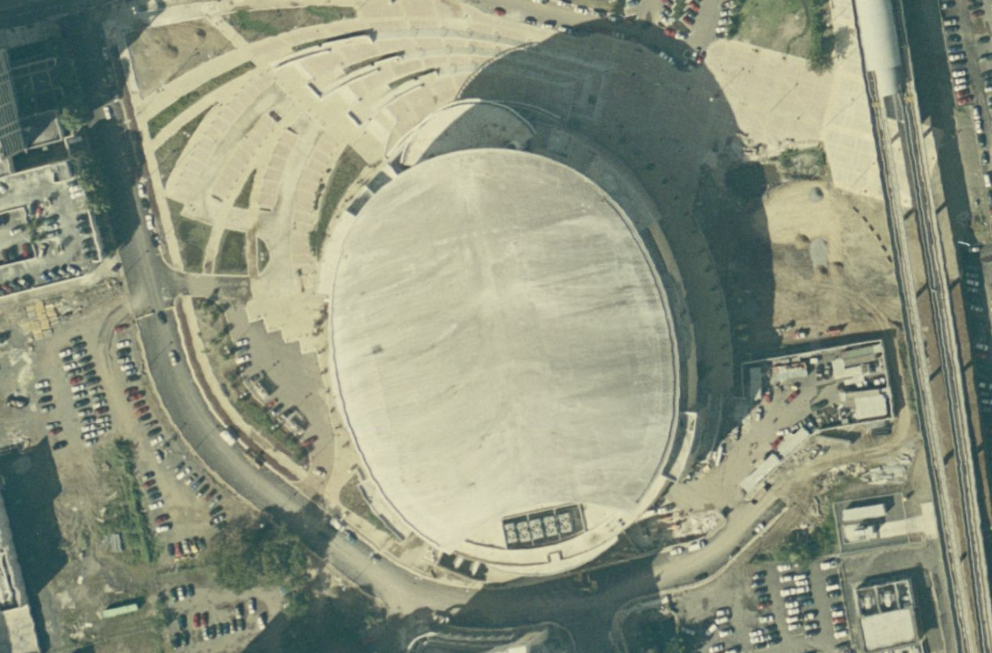
Satellite view of the Choliseo, 2007

Political opponents of the Rosselló administration raised various objections to the plan, claiming that the plot of land purchased for the construction would benefit financial contributors to his political party, the New Progressive Party (PNP). They also objected to the lack of parking space, claiming that private parking operators, supposedly also donors to the PNP, would extort high parking fees from people unable to use public transportation. At the time, the Tren Urbano was in its initial stages of construction, and by the time the Coliseum opened, it was still unfinished.

Opponents also objected to the privatization of the operations of the arena under a contract from the government of Puerto Rico that was perceived as highly expensive. The Rosselló administration countered by stating that previous experience with public facilities in Puerto Rico, which could quickly fall into disrepair at an accelerated rate due to weather, demanded that a resourceful private entity should manage the facility. The contract's expense would be justified by bringing in an operating partner with international experience managing world-class facilities, whose reputation would ensure that entertainment and sporting events unable to be staged in Puerto Rico before could now be take place in the main island.

==== Calderón administration ====
From 2001 to 2002, the construction of the Coliseum was halted during the administration of Governor Sila María Calderón, the leader of the opposition party, the Popular Democratic Party (PPD). Calderón claimed that the government of Puerto Rico had spent $242 million for a facility but only 42% of the scheduled project plan had been completed when she took office.

Part of the delay was due to the fact that the planners had overlooked a water pumping station next to the arena that had been built over unstable land, which resulted in the reconstruction of a portion of the foundations of the facility. Some called for the arena to be completely redesigned and reconstructed, which infuriated supporters of Rosselló, who dismissed the suggestion as merely an excuse to spend more government revenue to benefit the financial backers of the PPD.

=== Opening ===
Costing over $300 million, the Coliseum was inaugurated on September 4, 2004 with a maximum seating capacity of 18,500 spectators. However, the safety certification by Negociado de Bomberos de Puerto Rico (Puerto Rico Fire Department) assigned a maximum seating capacity of 19,500 spectators in 2021. The first major show was Van Halen, on September 13, 2004.

In 2004, local producer Angelo Medina spearheaded a group that unsuccessfully urged the legislature of Puerto Rico to curb the managing powers of operator SMG (merged into ASM Global since 2019), fearing that the company's relationship with non-local television companies would limit the participation of local talent in the arena. SMG officials stated that the company would only manage the arena and not produce events.

=== Major closings ===
The arena has suffered two significant closings. In September 2017, scheduled events were cancelled due to the devastating impacts caused in Puerto Rico by Hurricane Maria. It was used as a warehouse and collection center by the Government of Puerto Rico to prepare and distribute emergency supplies, before it resumed hosting events in March 2018. During the COVID-19 pandemic, events at the venue were cancelled or postponed from March 2020 until June 2021, when events were resumed with attendance modifications.

== Structural security ==
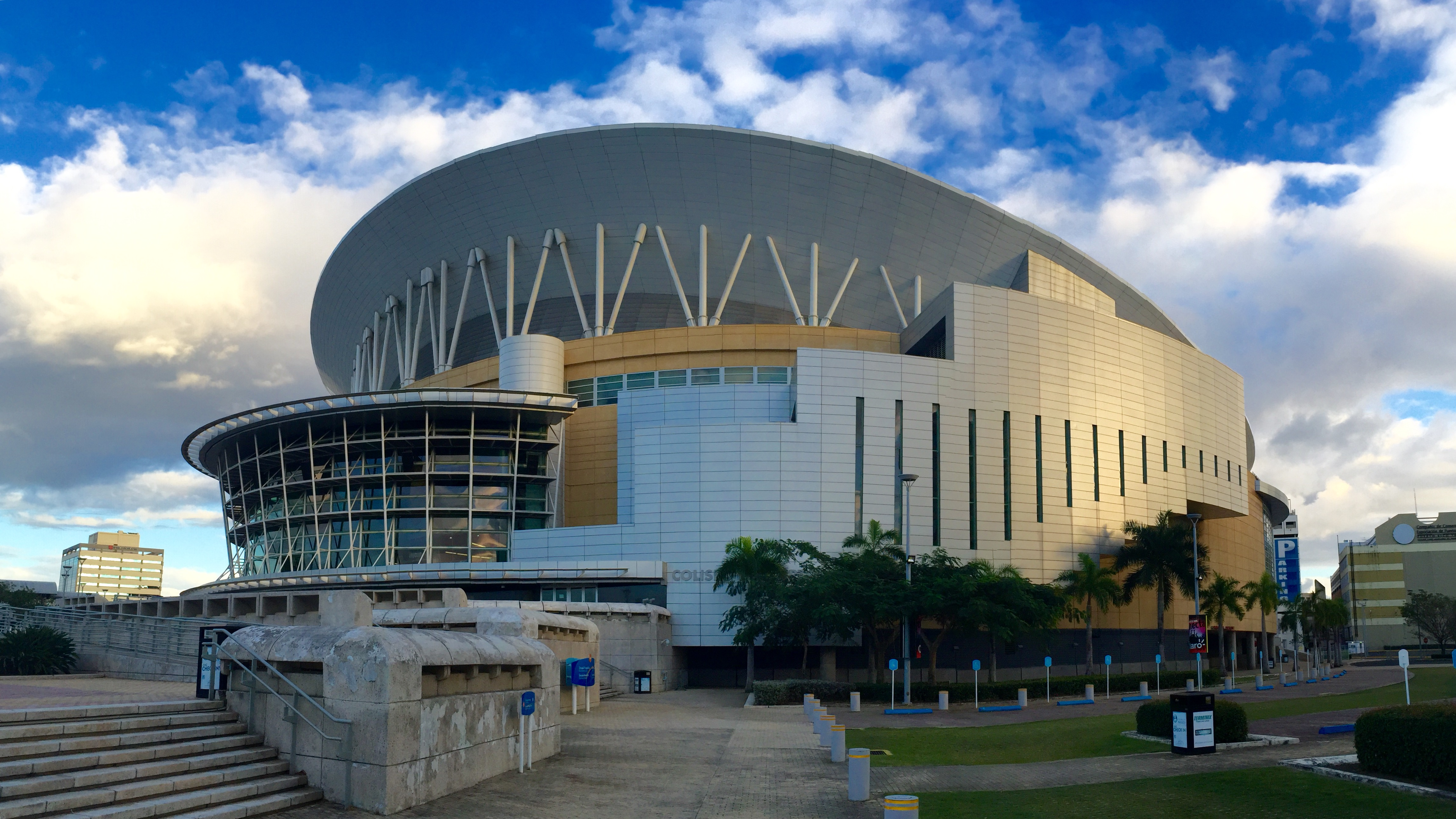
Side view (west) of the Choliseo, 2017

In 2010, an audit conducted by the Oficina del Contralor (Comptroller Office) regarding the physical condition of the Choliseo had revealed that the edifice exhibited construction defects related to cracks and exposed reinforcing steel in slabs, columns, and beams. The Puerto Rico Convention District Authority, owner of the arena, indicated that all observations arising from the report were duly addressed in a timely manner, adding that inspections and certification processes are carried out annually.

As of 2023, there was an investment of $8.3 million in 19 ongoing projects, mainly involving repairs and maintenance that are vital for the optimal functioning of the arena and aim to enhance the experience of spectators when attending events. Mariela Vallines, executive director of the Puerto Rico Convention District Authority, indicated that from 2018 to 2023, $6.8 million had been invested in the arena, amounting to 42 completed improvement projects.

In 2025, ASM Global, operational manager of the arena, explained that the arena has an advanced intelligent and continuous monitoring system supervising the structural behavior of the edifice in real time during earthquakes, hurricane-force winds, and the natural aging of the structure. This system integrates digital accelerometers, recording stations, specialized piping and wiring, as well as computerized data analysis and visualization programs, allowing for instant visual alerts regarding the condition of the edifice ("safe", "alert", or "danger"), which facilitate critical decisions such as evacuations. The arena also utilizes the services of structural engineer David McCloskey, who has been the structural engineer of the venue since its inauguration, to ensure that production designs adhere to accepted safety standards and do not compromise the structural capacity of the edifice.

== Parking and transportation ==
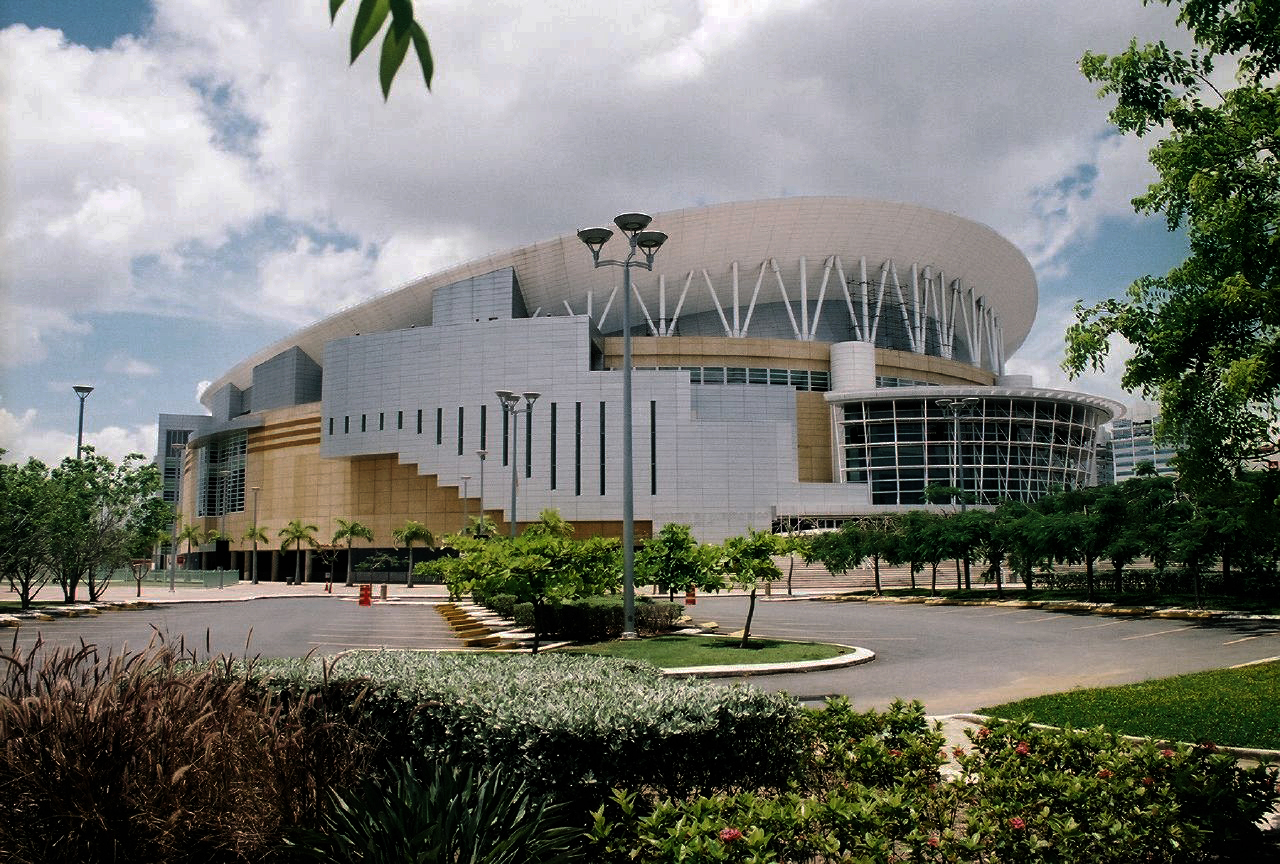
The Choliseo from the parking lot in the northeast, 2007

There are privately owned parking lots around the Coliseum of Puerto Rico, including a large parking garage. Originally, a public parking garage was not included in the construction for the arena. Instead, only three small parking lots were built: one for the backstage entrance in the south reserved for authorized talent, production, equipment, and props., one in the western side entrance mostly for handicapped individuals, and another in the northeast directly across from the box office, which is situated next to the main entrance in the north.

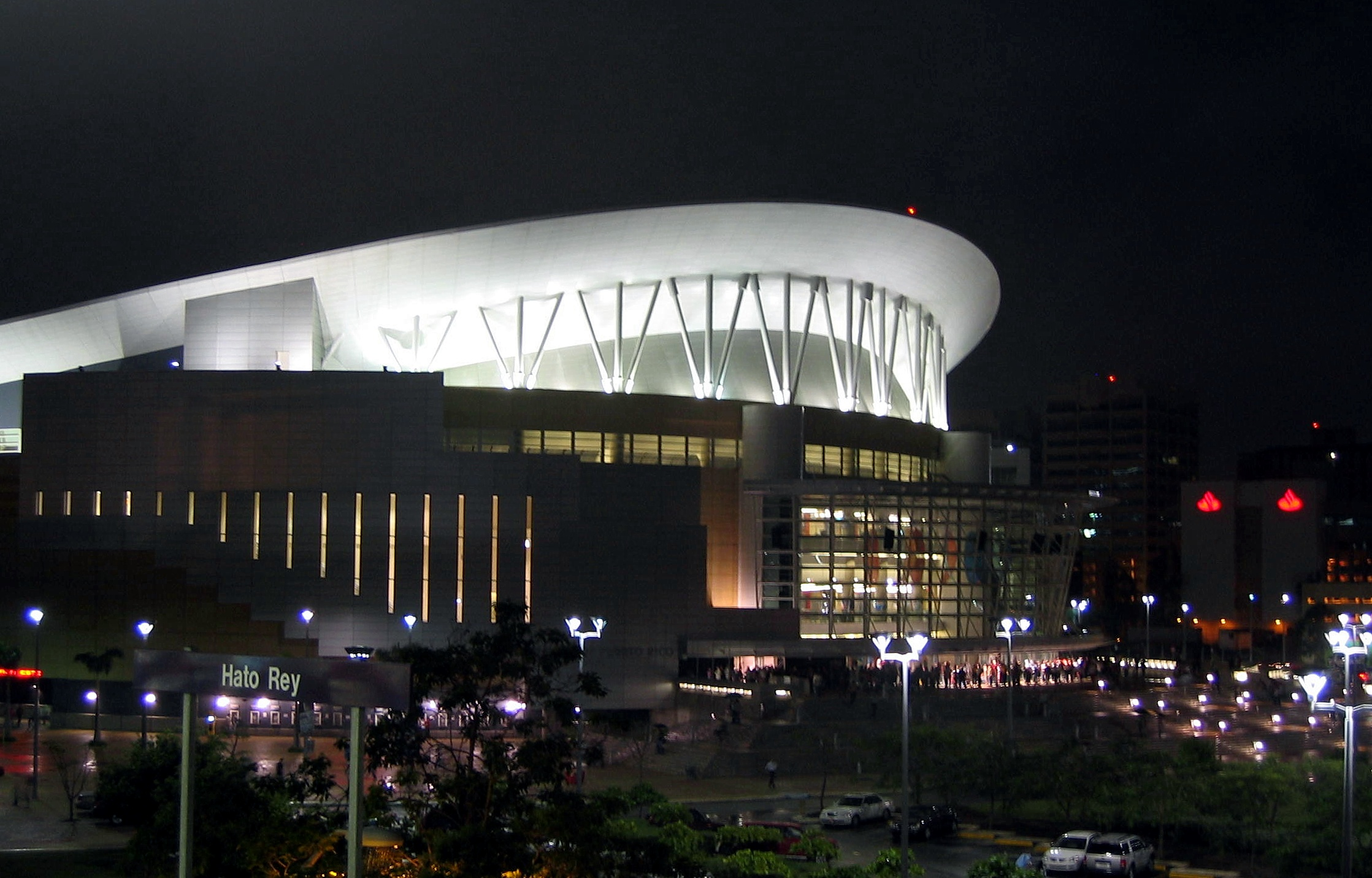
Night view of the Choliseo from the Hato Rey Station of the Tren Urbano, 2005

The Tren Urbano is a widely used method of transportation to and from the Choliseo, as the Hato Rey Station, located immediately next to the arena, is the only station to extend operating hours after nighttime events end until all passengers using the system have exited at the station of their respective destinations.

== Ticketing service ==
The current booking and ticketing service provider for the Coliseum of Puerto Rico is Ticketera.

Ticketpop, established in San Juan in 1999, remained the sole ticketing distributor from the opening day of the arena until August 28, 2019, when rising competitor Ticketera, established in San Juan in 2016, was given the exclusive contract. In April 2021, the entire subsidiary operations of Ticketpop were sold by its owner, the electronic transaction company Evertec, to Ticketera, whose founder also created Ticketpop.

With the opening of the Coliseum in 2004, an exclusive contract was awarded to Ticketpop, ignoring the bid presented by its competitor, TicketCenter. The original ticket vendor bidding controversy almost went to trial, as both parties argued over who would receive the contract, but the government of Puerto Rico stood by their original contract with Ticketpop.

== Notable events ==
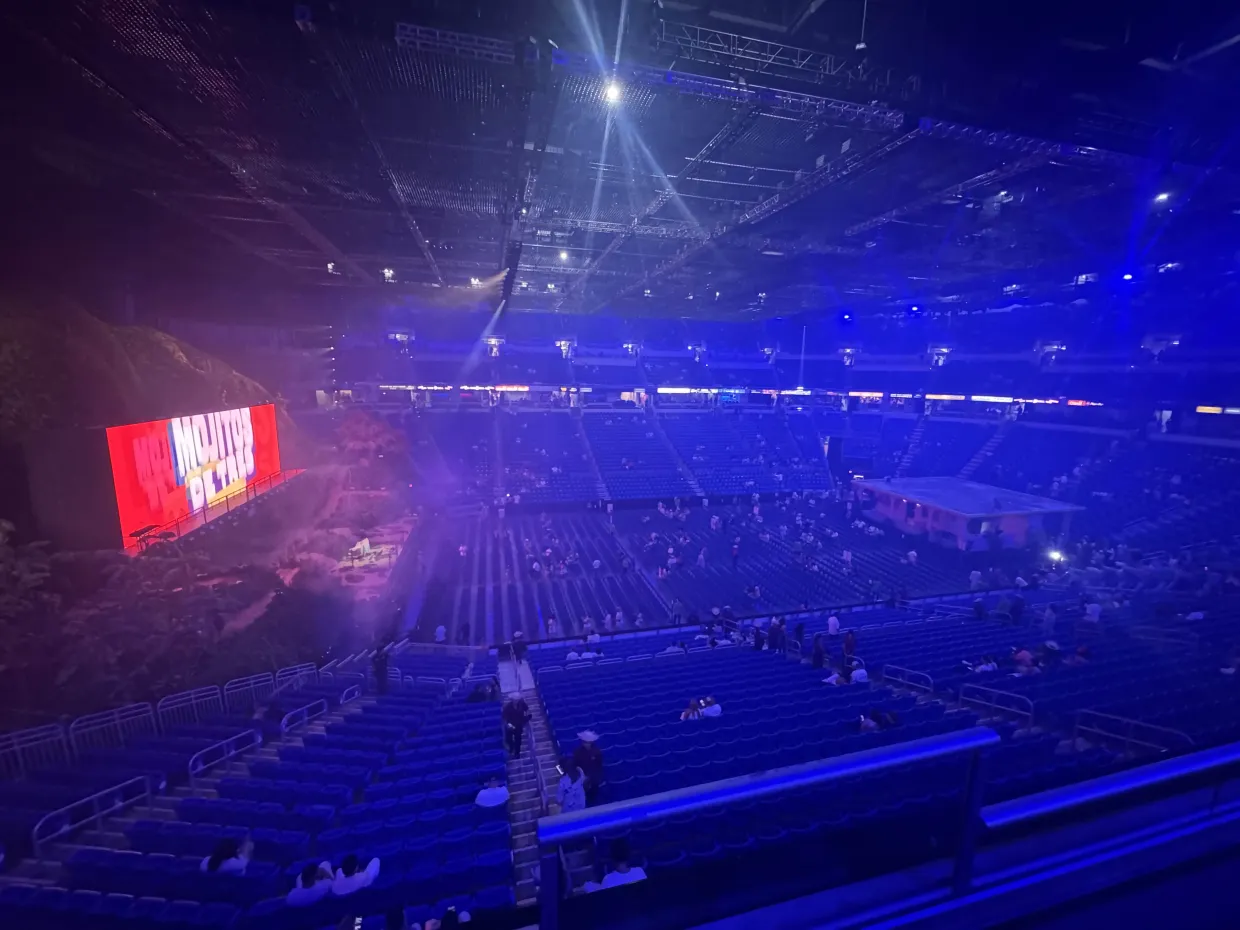
Inside the Choliseo during Bad Bunny’s No Me Quiero Ir de Aquí residency, 2025

The largest attendance record for the Choliseo was achieved on July 28, 2022, with Bad Bunny's World's Hottest Tour in support of the singer's 2023 album Un Verano Sin Ti. The event established an all-time record of 18,749 spectators on the first night of his three-night performances, breaking a previous record established by him in 2019. This was the first time a concert was fully broadcast live on national television in Puerto Rico, which was exclusively through the airwaves of Telemundo Puerto Rico.

Wisin & Yandel hold various records, some of which they have previously broken as well, including most performances at the Choliseo, by any performing artist, duo or group, increasing it to 39 and largest number of shows sold out in 24 hours.

The Choliseo hosted Bad Bunny's first concert residency, No Me Quiero Ir de Aquí, the first one at the arena, as well as in Puerto Rico, in support of his 2025 album Debí Tirar Más Fotos. The 30-date residency lasted from July 11 to September 13, 2025, with a concert taking place every Friday, Saturday, and Sunday. On September 15, 2025, one day after the original 30-date run of the residency ended, Bad Bunny announced a thirty-first show, dubbed Una Más (transl. One more), which took place on September 20.

On September 23, 2025, the Government of Puerto Rico and the Miss Universe organization announced that the Choliseo would be the venue for Miss Universe 2026, which is scheduled to take place in November 2026. This marks the first time that the arena hosts the pageant, and the fourth time that Puerto Rico hosts the pageant, with the others being in 1972, 2001, and 2002.

== See also ==
- Coliseo Rubén Rodríguez
- Puerto Rico Convention Center
- Roberto Clemente Coliseum
