= Sagrado Corazón station =

Rail station of the Tren Urbano system in Puerto Rico

Sagrado Corazón
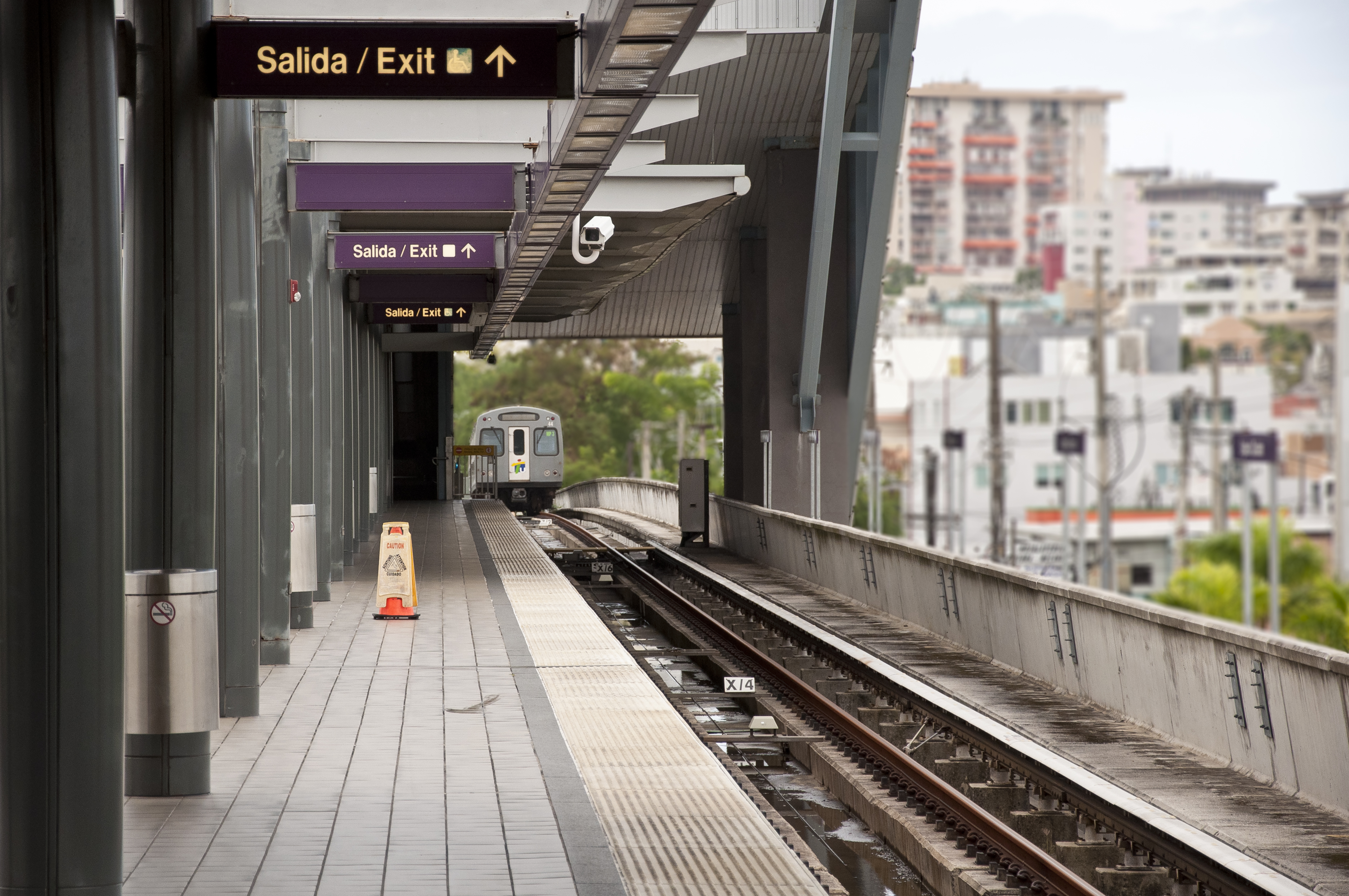

General information
- Location: Fernández Juncos Avenue; San Juan, Puerto Rico
- Coordinates: 18.436711°N 66.060724°W
- Owner: Puerto Rico Department of Transportation and Public Works
- Operator: Alternate Concepts
- Platforms: 1 island platform
- Tracks: 2

Construction
- Structure type: Elevated
- Accessible: Yes

History
- Opened: December 17, 2004; 21 years ago

Services
| Preceding station | Tren Urbano | Following station |
|---|---|---|
| Hato Rey toward Bayamón | Tren Urbano | Terminus |
Location

Sagrado Corazón station is a rapid transit station in San Juan, Puerto Rico. Located the Martín Peña neighborhood at the southern edge of Santurce. The station is named after the district and the university of the same name. Opening on December 17, 2004, this is the northern terminus of the Tren Urbano line. The station features a stained glass display of public art display entitled Vitral by Luis Hernández Cruz.

== Nearby ==
- Sagrado Corazón University
- Sagrado Corazón and Monteflores historic zone
- San Juan YMCA

=== Bus terminal ===
Bus terminal is located at the south entrance of the station:

- E10 express route: Sagrado Corazón – Old San Juan Covadonga Terminal
- T2: Sagrado Corazón – Hato Rey – Plaza Las Américas – Hiram Bithorn Stadium – Roberto Clemente Coliseum – San Patricio – Caparra – Bayamón Station
- T3: Sagrado Corazón – Santurce – Miramar – Old San Juan Covadonga Terminal
- T9: Old San Juan Covadonga Terminal – Miramar – Santurce – Sagrado Corazón – Barrio Obrero – Hato Rey (through Barbosa Ave.) – Río Piedras – Cupey Station
- T21: Sagrado Corazón – Santurce – Museum of Art of Puerto Rico – Condado – Old San Juan Covadonga Terminal
- C1: Sagrado Corazón – Hato Rey (through Ponce de León Ave. & PR-1) – Río Piedras
- C22: Sagrado Corazón – Hato Rey – Plaza Las Américas – Hiram Bithorn Stadium – Roberto Clemente Coliseum
- C35: Sagrado Corazón – Central Park – Puerto Rico Convention Center
- C36: Sagrado Corazón – Residencial Luis Lloréns Torres – Punta Las Marías
- D15: Sagrado Corazón – Hato Rey – Residencial Manuel A. Pérez – Río Piedras – Cupey Station
- D45: Sagrado Corazón – Isla Verde – Piñones – Loíza

== Gallery ==
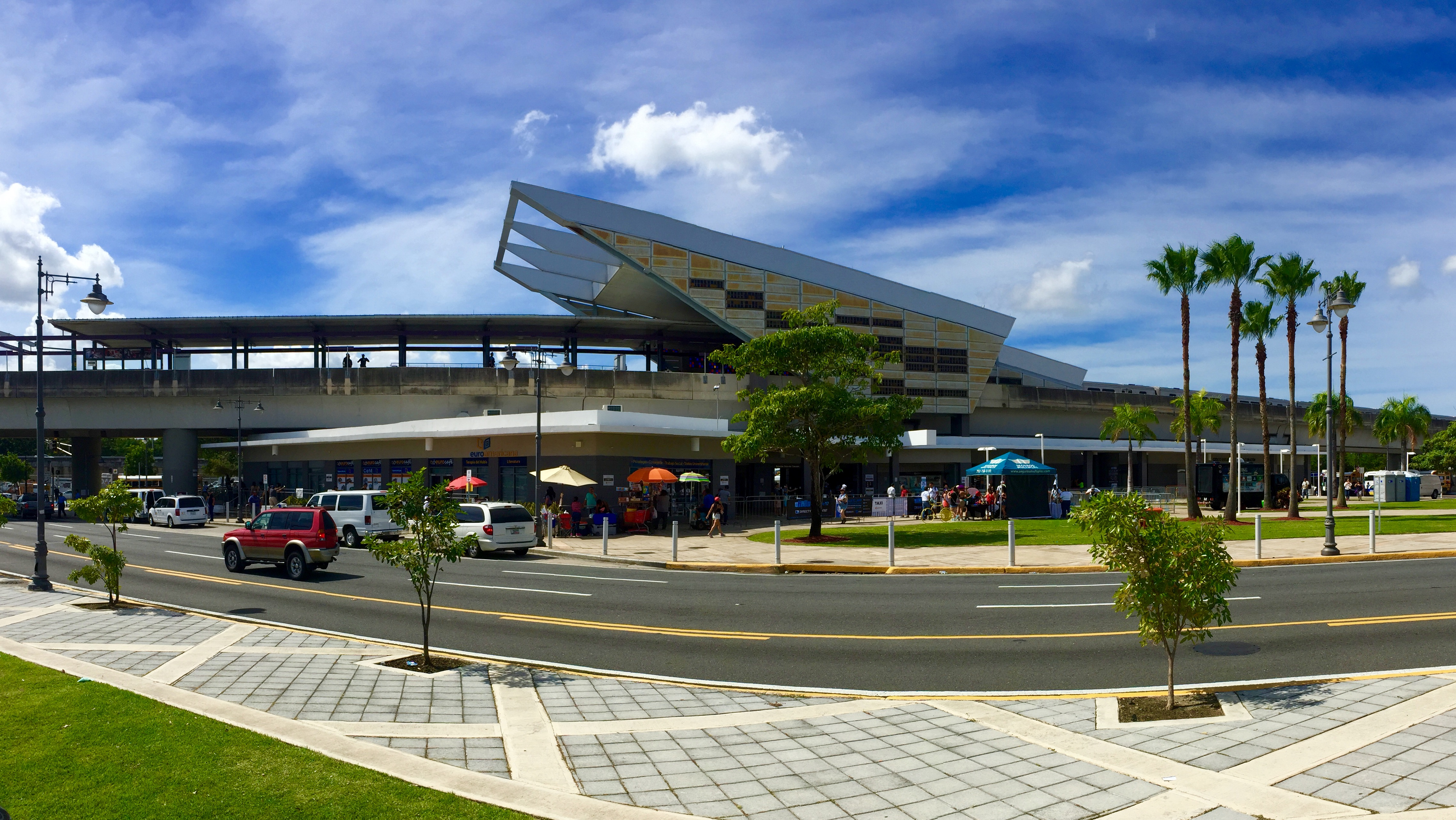
The station seen from Manuel Fernández Juncos Avenue

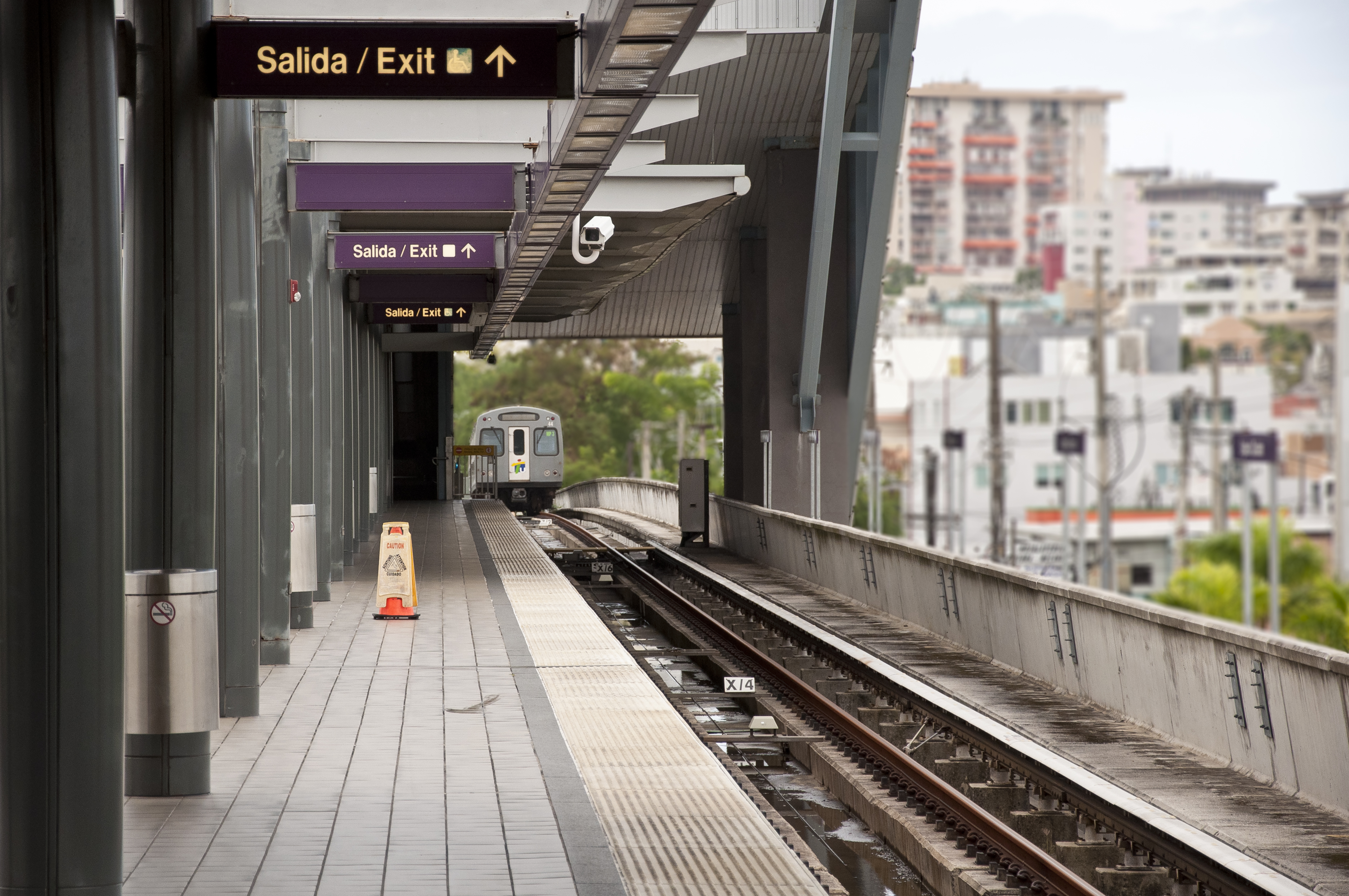
View of Santurce from the station platform

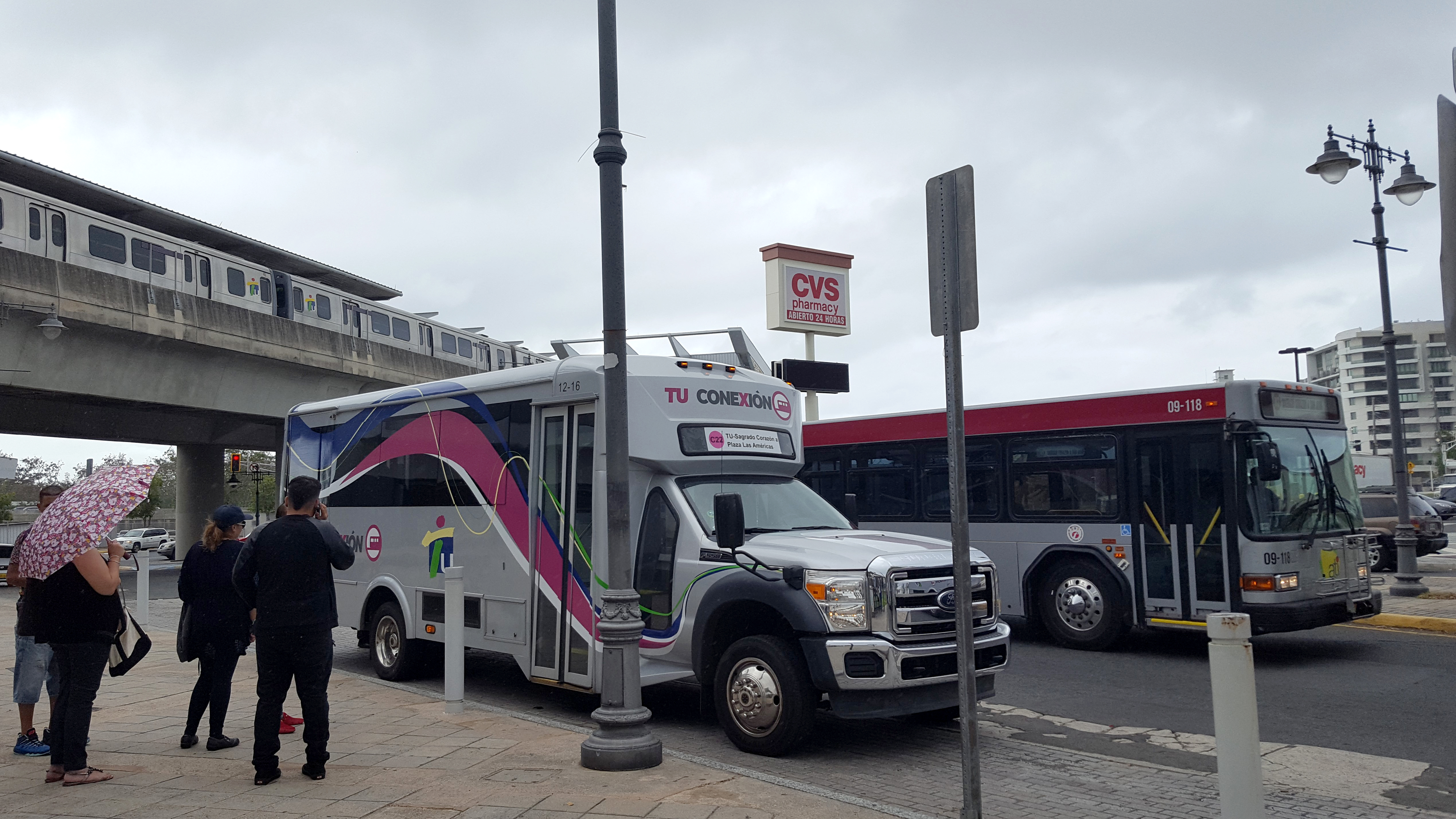
Bus station located next to the station

== See also ==
- List of Tren Urbano stations
- Tren Urbano Phase 1A
