= Bayamón station =

Rail station of the Tren Urbano system in San Juan, Puerto Rico

Bayamón
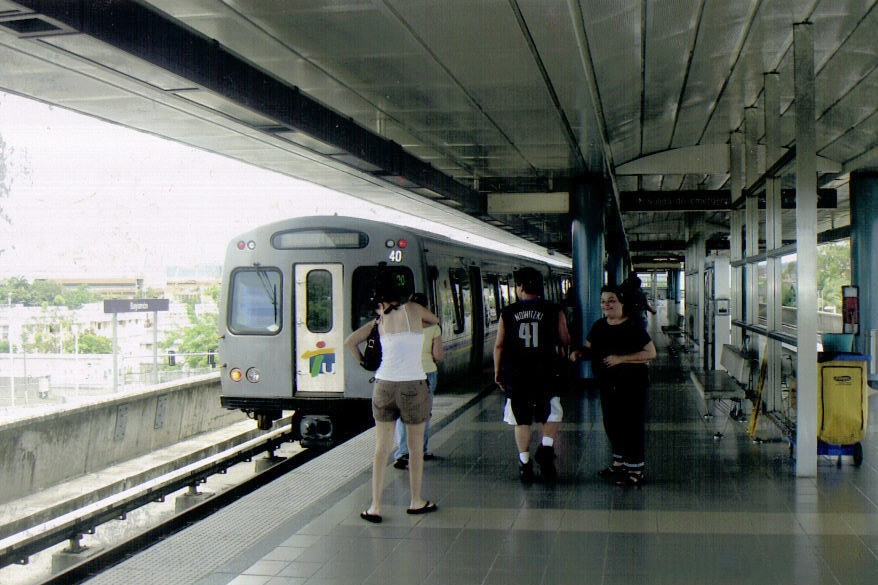
- The platform

General information
- Coordinates: 18°24′00″N 66°09′14″W
- Owner: Puerto Rico Department of Transportation and Public Works
- Operator: Alternate Concepts
- Platforms: 1 island platform
- Tracks: 2

Construction
- Structure type: Elevated

History
- Opened: December 17, 2004; 21 years ago

Services
| Preceding station | Tren Urbano | Following station |
|---|---|---|
| Terminus | Tren Urbano | Deportivo toward Sagrado Corazón |
Location

Bayamón is a rapid transit station in the San Juan agglomeration, Puerto Rico. It is the western terminus of the Tren Urbano system, located after Deportivo station. The station is located in Bayamón, just outside of its downtown (Bayamón Pueblo). The trial service ran in 2004, however, the regular service only started on 6 June 2005.

== Bus terminal ==
The bus terminal is located at the west entrance of the station.

- E20 (MU): Bayamón TU station – Campanilla park-and-ride
- T2: Bayamón TU station (through Juan Ponce de León Ave) – Sagrado Corazón TU station
- T3 (M3): Bayamón TU station (through Juan Ponce de León Ave) – Sagrado Corazón TU station
- 37: Bayamón TU station – Cataño Ferry Terminal
- 91: Bayamón TU station – UPR Bayamón – Santa Juanita
- 92: Bayamón TU station – Magnolia Gardens

In addition to AMA services, the bus terminal also has connections to municipal buses, carros públicos and the Interamerican University of Puerto Rico Bayamón trolley system.

== Nearby ==
- Casa Alcaldía de Bayamón
- Bayamón Health Center
- Bayamón Pueblo
  - Bayamón Marketplace
  - Casa Dr. Agustín Stahl Stamm
  - Casa Natal Dr. José Celso Barbosa
  - Invención de la Santa Cruz parish church and the town's main plaza
  - Francisco Oller Museum at the former city hall
- Bayamón River Park Trail, La Cambija trailhead by Río Hondo
- El Cantón Mall
- Estrella del Norte Park
- Historic Marqués de la Serna Bridge
- Parque de las Ciencias Luis A. Ferré
- Plaza del Sol
- Puerto Rico National Cemetery
- Universidad Metropolitana (UMET) de Bayamón
