= William B. Fasig =

American horseman and auctioneer (1845–1902)

- Born: William Benjamin Fasig; September 27, 1845; Ashland, Ohio, U.S.
- Died: February 19, 1902; Brewster, New York, U.S.
- Resting place: Lake View Cemetery, Cleveland, Ohio, U.S.
- Occupations: Horseman, auctioneer, racing official
- Known for: Co-founder of Fasig-Tipton

William Benjamin Fasig (September 27, 1845 – February 19, 1902) was an American horseman, harness racing official, racetrack manager, and horse auctioneer. He served as secretary of the Cleveland Driving Park Association and became a prominent figure in American harness racing during the late 19th century. He entered the horse-sales business and later co-founded Fasig-Tipton with Edward A. Tipton in 1898.

== Early life ==
William Benjamin Fasig was born in Ashland, Ohio, United States in 1845. He was a son of Samuel and Lucinda Greenland Fasig.

At the age of 16, he left school and enlisted in the Union Army's 42nd Ohio Infantry Regiment, commanded by James A. Garfield, and served during the American Civil War.

== Career ==
Fasig moved to Cleveland around the late 1870s following the war. Before entering the horse business full-time, the Cleveland city directory in 1877 listed him as a cashier for Jennings & Higgins.

=== Harness racing career ===
Fasig became involved in harness racing, initially as a driver and later as a horse owner and racing official. He became closely associated with the development of the Cleveland Driving Park. He was named racing secretary of the Cleveland Driving Park Association in 1882. Fasig worked alongside Col. William Edwards in developing the Cleveland track into a major racing venue.

While living in Cleveland, Fasig owned several prominent trotters, including Eloise, Rifle, Wyando, and Marguerite. Eloise won the Cleveland Challenge Cup for trotters in 1896. He generally favored trotters over pacers and reportedly owned only one pacer, Wyreka, which was double-gaited.

He was also involved in the development of racetrack design. In 1887, while secretary of the Cleveland Driving Park Association, Fasig proposed the use of a kite-shaped track consisting of two long straightaways connected by a broad turn. The design was intended to reduce the amount of time horses spent negotiating curves and was subsequently used at several prominent harness racing tracks.

During the 1890s, Fasig's activities extended beyond Cleveland. After Charter Oak Park in Hartford, Connecticut was acquired by Andrew J. Welch, Fasig was appointed manager of the track. Harness racing and Grand Circuit competition returned to Charter Oak Park in 1897 under the new management.

=== Horse sales ===
Fasig later left racetrack administration to enter the horse-sales business. He began conducting combination sales of trotters during the 1880s. As his auction business expanded, he became associated with the English auction house Tattersalls. When the New York branch of Tattersalls was established, Fasig was appointed manager of its trotting department. Fasig's Cleveland sales repository was incorporated into the company. He resigned from Tattersalls in 1896.

He later established his own sales firm, William B. Fasig & Co., and moved increasingly into the New York horse-sales business. In 1898, Fasig entered into partnership with Kentucky horseman Edward A. Tipton. Their firm, Fasig-Tipton, was headquartered at Madison Square Garden in New York City. After Fasig's death, the Fasig-Tipton company continued under Tipton and later Enoch James Tranter. It subsequently became particularly associated with Thoroughbred sales and developed into North America's oldest operating Thoroughbred auction company.

== Death ==
W. B. Fasig died on February 19, 1902, in Brewster, New York, United States, at age 56. He was buried at Lake View Cemetery in Cleveland.

== Legacy ==
A collection of his writings and a memoir of his career were published posthumously in 1903 by racing writer William H. Gocher as Fasig's Tales of the Turf.

W. G. Pollock, vice president of the Cleveland Driving Park Association, described Fasig as one of the earliest prominent track secretaries in harness racing.

He introduced higher standards to horse auctions and established himself as one of the leading salesmen in the American trotting industry. Fasig's name continued through the Fasig-Tipton company after his death. The firm later became particularly prominent for its Thoroughbred yearling and breeding-stock auctions.

== Gallery ==
William B. Fasig (1845-1902)
