= Puerto Rico Metropolitan Bus Authority =

Government-owned corporation of Puerto Rico

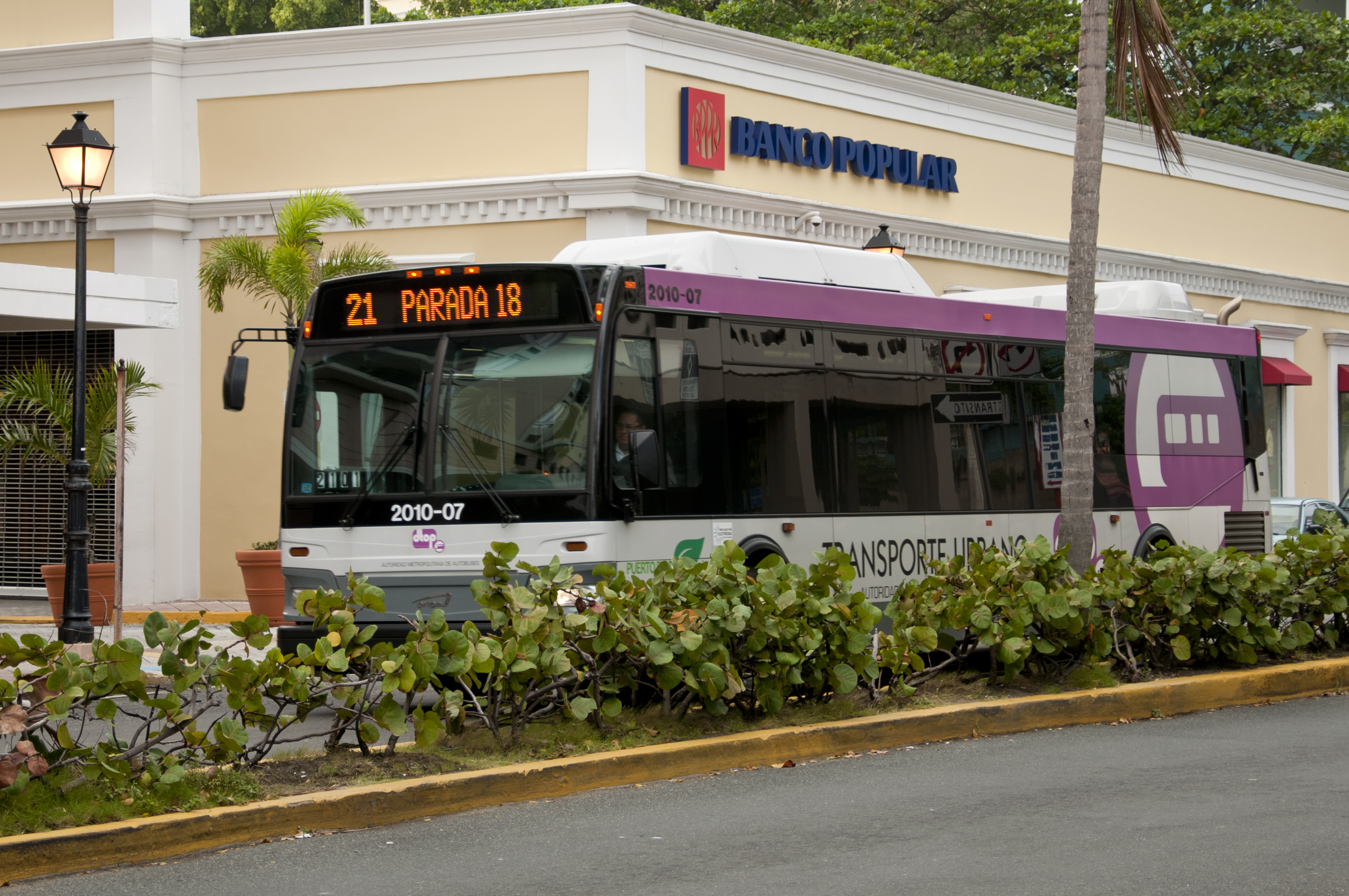
- Puerto Rico Metropolitan Bus Authority (AMA) bus
- Founded: May 11, 1959; 67 years ago
- Headquarters: 37 De Diego Ave; San Juan, Puerto Rico
- Service area: San Juan, Puerto Rico metropolitan area
- Service type: Public transport
- Alliance: Tren Urbano and Cataño Ferry
- Routes: 32
- Daily ridership: 9,900 (weekdays, Q2 2026)
- Annual ridership: 2,029,400 (2025)
- Fuel type: Diesel, hybrid electric
- Website: dtop.pr.gov

Autoridad Metropolitana de Autobuses (AMA, English: Puerto Rico Metropolitan Bus Authority) is a government-owned corporation and public transport bus service based in the San Juan metropolitan area. It is part of the Puerto Rico Department of Transportation and Public Works and the Puerto Rico Integrated Transit Authority (ATI). In 2025, the system had a ridership of 2,029,400, or about 9,900 per weekday as of the second quarter of 2026.

== Background ==
Autoridad Metropolitana de Autobuses was created as a public corporation on May 11, 1959. The operations would later be integrated into the Department of Transportation and Public Works in 1973 and the Integrated Transit Authority in 2014. It is the second oldest public transport authority in America, behind New York's Metropolitan Transportation Authority.

AMA is one of three major public transportation systems serving the San Juan metropolitan area, along with Tren Urbano and the Cataño Ferry.

== Service ==
AMA provides bus transportation in the San Juan metropolitan area—which includes the municipalities of San Juan, Guaynabo, Bayamón, Trujillo Alto, Cataño, Toa Baja, Carolina, and Loíza—through a network of 32 fixed bus routes.

Most routes operate Monday through Friday from 5AM to 9PM; and Saturdays and holidays from 6:00AM to 8:00PM. Only routes E30, E40, and T3 offer Sunday service, along with Tren Urbano and the Cataño Ferry.

Most bus stops are identified with a "Parada" (English: stop) green sign.

== Fares ==
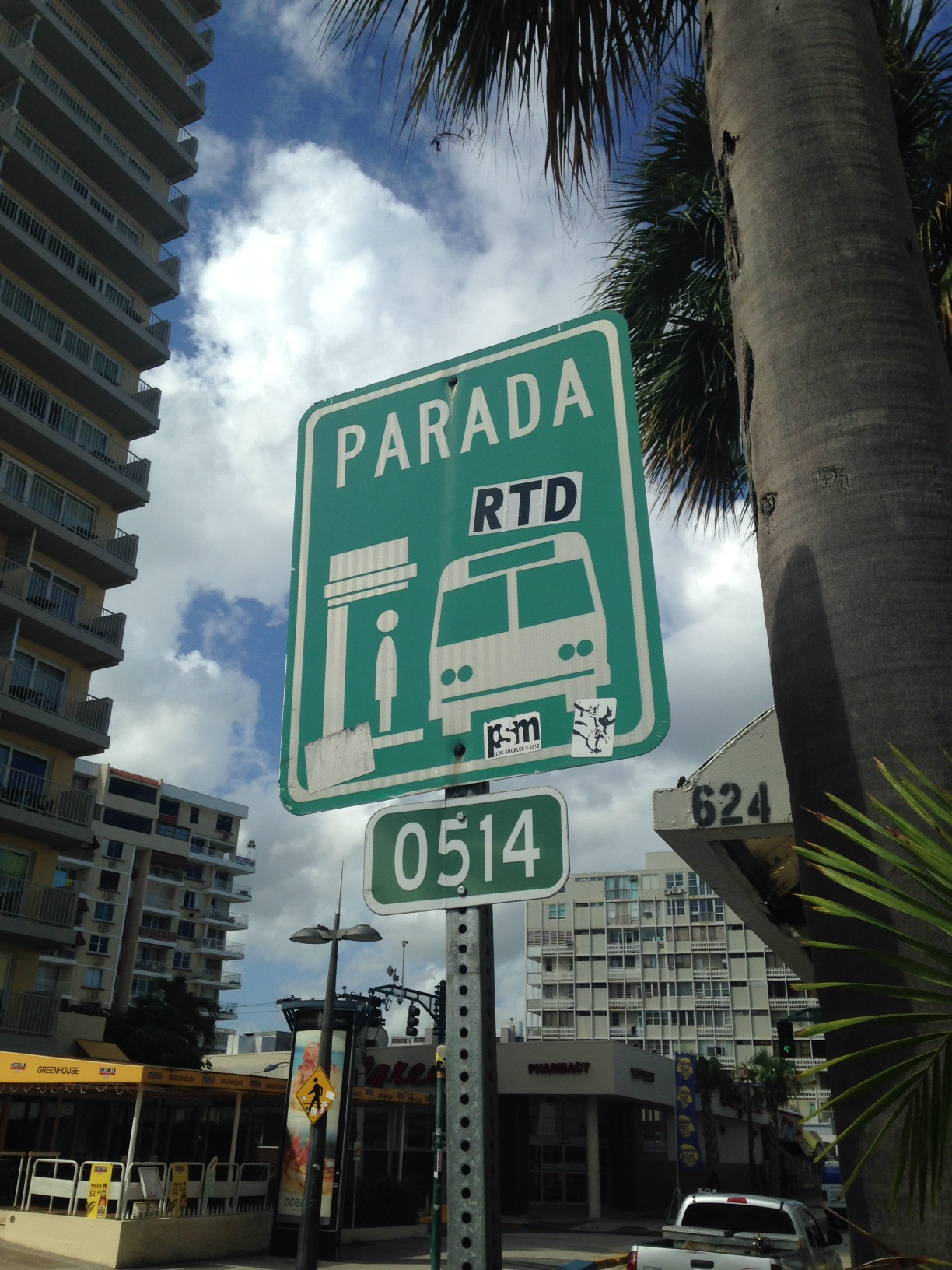
Bus stop on Avenida Ashford across from the Best Western Plus in Condado

The regular service fare is $0.75 per ride. The only bus routes with a different fare are Routes E20 and E30 with a $2.00 cost per ride. Reduced fares are available for students, seniors, and people with disabilities.

All buses require exact change in coins or the use of a contactless card or tap to pay mobile phone or watch.

Service	Regular service	Route E20/E30 (MU)
Full Fare (ages 3 and up)	$0.75	$2.00
Children 2 and under	Free	Free
Student Discount Program	$0.60	$1.00
Golden Program	Free	Free
Half Fare Program	$0.75	$1.00
Llame y Viaje (Paratransit)	$1.50	
Unlimited passes TU/AMA
1-Day	$5.00	
7-Day	$15.00	
30-Day	$50.00	
90-Day	$90.00	

== Routes ==
ATI manages the operation of thirty-two bus routes in the San Juan metropolitan area; twenty-four operated by AMA and eight by First Transit. The design of the bus network includes four service categories to guide the customers and improve the coordination between buses, ferry, públicos, municipal buses, and Tren Urbano.

Route	Terminals			Major streets traveled	Notes
EXPRESS ROUTES				Limited number of stops and route mostly on exclusive lanes or expressways.	
E10 (ME)	Sagrado Corazón; TU station	↔	Old San Juan; Covadonga Terminal	Luis Muñoz Rivera Expressway (PR-1), Calle del Tren	Weekday service only until 8:00pm; 15-minute peak period service frequency; Branded as Metrobús Expreso
E20 (MU)	Bayamón; TU station	↔	Campanilla; Park-and-ride	Río Hondo Expressway (PR-5), José de Diego Expressway (PR-22)	Weekday service only until 7:00pm; 15-minute peak period service frequency; Branded as Metro Urbano
E30 (MU)	Cupey; TU station	↔	Caguas; Bus terminal	Luis A Ferré Expressway (PR-52)	Daily service until 7:00pm; Branded as Metro Urbano
E40	Piñero; TU station	↔	LMM International Airport (SJU)	Jesús T. Piñero Hwy (PR-17), The Mall of San Juan	Daily service until 8:00pm; Bus stops at the airport located on the upper level; TU CONEXIÓN shuttle
TRUNK ROUTES				Primary routes connecting Tren Urbano stations and transit terminals with headways between 10 and 25 minutes in peak periods.	
T2	Sagrado Corazón; TU station	↔	Bayamón; TU station	FD Roosevelt Ave, PR-2	Formerly known as Metrobús II
T3 (M3)	Sagrado Corazón; TU station	↔	Old San Juan; Covadonga Terminal	Juan Ponce de León Ave	Daily service until 11:00pm; 10-minute peak period service frequency; Branded as Metrobús
T4	Piñero; TU station	↔	Cataño; Ferry Terminal	Juan Ponce de León Ave, Luis Muñoz Rivera Ave, Chardón Ave, Calaf St, FD Roosevelt Ave, PR-165, PR-24	
T5	Old San Juan; Covadonga Terminal	↔	Iturregui; Bus Terminal	Juan Ponce de León Ave, José de Diego Ave, Loíza St, Isla Verde Ave, LMM International Airport (SJU), Marginal Los Angeles	
T7	Cupey; TU station	↔	Carolina; Bus Terminal	65 de Infanteria Ave (PR-3)	
T9	Cupey; TU station	↔	Old San Juan; Covadonga Terminal	Barbosa Ave, Borinquen Ave, Manuel Fernández Juncos Ave	
T21	Plaza Las Américas	↔	Old San Juan; Covadonga Terminal	Juan Ponce de León Ave, José de Diego Ave, Ashford Ave, Magdalena St	
T41	Piñero; TU station	↔	Iturregui; Bus Terminal	Mayagüez St, Barbosa Ave, 65 de Infantería Ave, Simón Madera St, Ramal 8, Campo Rico Ave	
CIRCULATION ROUTES				Short length routes around Tren Urbano stations or transit terminals operating at headways between 20 and 30 minutes in peak periods.	
1	Sagrado Corazón; TU station	↔	65 de Infanteria Ave	Juan Ponce de León Ave, Luis Muñoz Rivera Ave, Gándara Ave, Barbosa Ave	Weekday service only until 8:00pm
C22	Sagrado Corazón; TU station	↔	Plaza Las Américas	Chardón St, Hostos Ave, Arterial B Ave	Weekday service only until 8:00pm; TU CONEXIÓN shuttle
C35	Sagrado Corazón; TU station	↻	Puerto Rico Convention Center	Manuel Fernández Juncos Ave, Cerra St, Hoare St, Juan Ponce de León Ave	Weekday service only until 8:00pm; TU CONEXIÓN shuttle
C36	Sagrado Corazón; TU station	↻	Lloréns Torres	Borinquen Ave, Eduardo Conde Ave, Degetau St, Marginal Baldorioty de Castro, Isla Verde Ave, Loíza St, Tapia St, Juan Ponce de León Ave	Weekday service only until 8:00pm; TU CONEXIÓN shuttle
43	Iturregui; Bus Terminal	↻	Plaza Escorial	Pontezuela Ave, Galicia Ave, Campo Rico Ave, PR-190, Monserrate Ave, Fidalgo Díaz Ave, Jesús M. Fragoso Ave, PR-3, El Comandante Ave	
44	Carolina; Bus Terminal	↻	Campo Rico Avenue	Dr. Sánchez Castaño Ave, Eloy Hernández St, Inocencio Cruz St, Calderón Ave, Monserrate Ave, Roberto Clemente Ave, 419 St, Campo Rico Ave, Fidalgo Díaz Ave	
DISTRIBUTION ROUTES				Connection routes between Tren Urbano or transit terminals to sub-urban or rural areas with frequencies between 30 and 90 minutes in peak periods.	
6	Carolina; Bus Terminal	↔	Iturregui; Bus Terminal	Campo Rico Ave, Sánchez Osorio Ave, Jesús M. Fragoso Ave	
8	Piñero; TU station	↔	Martínez Nadal; TU station	Jesús T. Piñero Ave	
15	Cupey; TU station	↔	Sagrado Corazón; TU station	Quisqueya St, Barbosa Ave, Trujillo Alto Expressway (PR-181), José de Diego St	
17	Cupey; TU station	↔	Piñero; TU station	Centro Médico Station, San Patricio Ave, Jesús T. Piñero Ave, Andalucía Ave, FD Roosevelt Ave, Domenech Ave	
18	Cupey; TU station	↔	Alturas de Cupey	Paraná St, Winston Churchill Ave, Las Cumbres Ave	
19	Martínez Nadal; TU station	↔	Centro Médico; TU station	San Patricio Ave, FD Roosevelt Ave, De Diego Ave, Américo Miranda Ave	
26	Piñero; TU station	↔	Trujillo Alto Plaza	Gándara Ave, José de Diego St, Trujillo Alto Expressway, Park Gardens Ave, Frontera Ave, PR-846, Ave A, Venus Ave, PR-199	
27	Martínez Nadal; TU station	↔	Guaynabo	Francisco Paz Granela Ave, Lomas Verdes Ave, Camino Alejandrino, Esmeralda Ave, Carazo St, PR-886	
31	Cupey; TU station	↔	Emiliano Pol Ave	Paraná Ave, Lomas Verdes Ave, Las Cumbres Ave, Emiliano Pol Ave	
37	Bayamón; TU station	↔	Cataño; Ferry Terminal	PR-167, Sabana Seca Ave, CDT Toa Baja, Dr. Diego Álvarez Chanca St, Boulevard Levittown, PR-165, Las Nereidas Ave	
45	Sagrado Corazón; TU station	↔	Loíza	Sagrado Corazón St, Tapia St, Isla Verde Ave, PR-187	
53	Old San Juan; Covadonga Terminal	↔	LMM International Airport (SJU)	Ashford Ave, Magdalena St, McLeary St, Isla Verde Ave	
55	Carolina; Bus Terminal	↔	Loíza	65 de Infanteria Ave (PR-3), The Outlet 66 Mall, PR-188	
91	Bayamón; TU station	↔	Santa Juanita	Bobby Capó Ave, Main Ave, PR-174, UPR Bayamón, Laurel Ave, Santa Juanita Ave, Hostos Ave, Minillas Ave	
92	Bayamón; TU station	↔	Magnolia Gardens	PR-174, Lomas Verdes Ave, Santa Juanita Ave, Magnolia Ave	

Notes
Operated by First Transit

^{1}Effective October 30, 2023
^{2}Peak period service: 6:00am-9:00am and 3:00pm-6:00pm

== Transit hubs ==
- Bo. Campanilla Terminal: E20, municipal buses
- Carolina Terminal: T6, T7, 44, municipal buses
- Cataño Terminal: T4, 37, municipal buses, públicos
- Hato Rey Transfer Center: TU Roosevelt, T2, T4, 1
- Iturregui Terminal: T5, T6, T41, 43, municipal buses
- Río Piedras (Capetillo) Transfer Center: T7, T9, T41, 1, 15, 26, municipal buses, públicos
- TU Bayamón Bus Terminal: E20, T2, 37, 91, 92, municipal buses, públicos, Inter American University Bayamón trolley
- TU Centro Médico Transfer Center: 17, 19
- TU Cupey Bus Terminal: E30, T7, T9, 15, 17, 18, 31, Inter American University Metro trolley
- TU Martínez Nadal Bus Terminal: T8, 19, 27, municipal buses
- TU Piñero Bus Terminal: E40, T4, T8, T41, 26
- TU Sagrado Corazón Bus Terminal: E10, T2, T3, T9, T21, 1, 15, 22, 35, 36, 45, municipal buses, públicos, Dolphy-Universidad del Sagrado Corazón
- Viejo San Juan (Covadonga) Terminal: E10, T3, T5, T9, T21, 53, municipal buses, públicos

== Active bus fleet ==
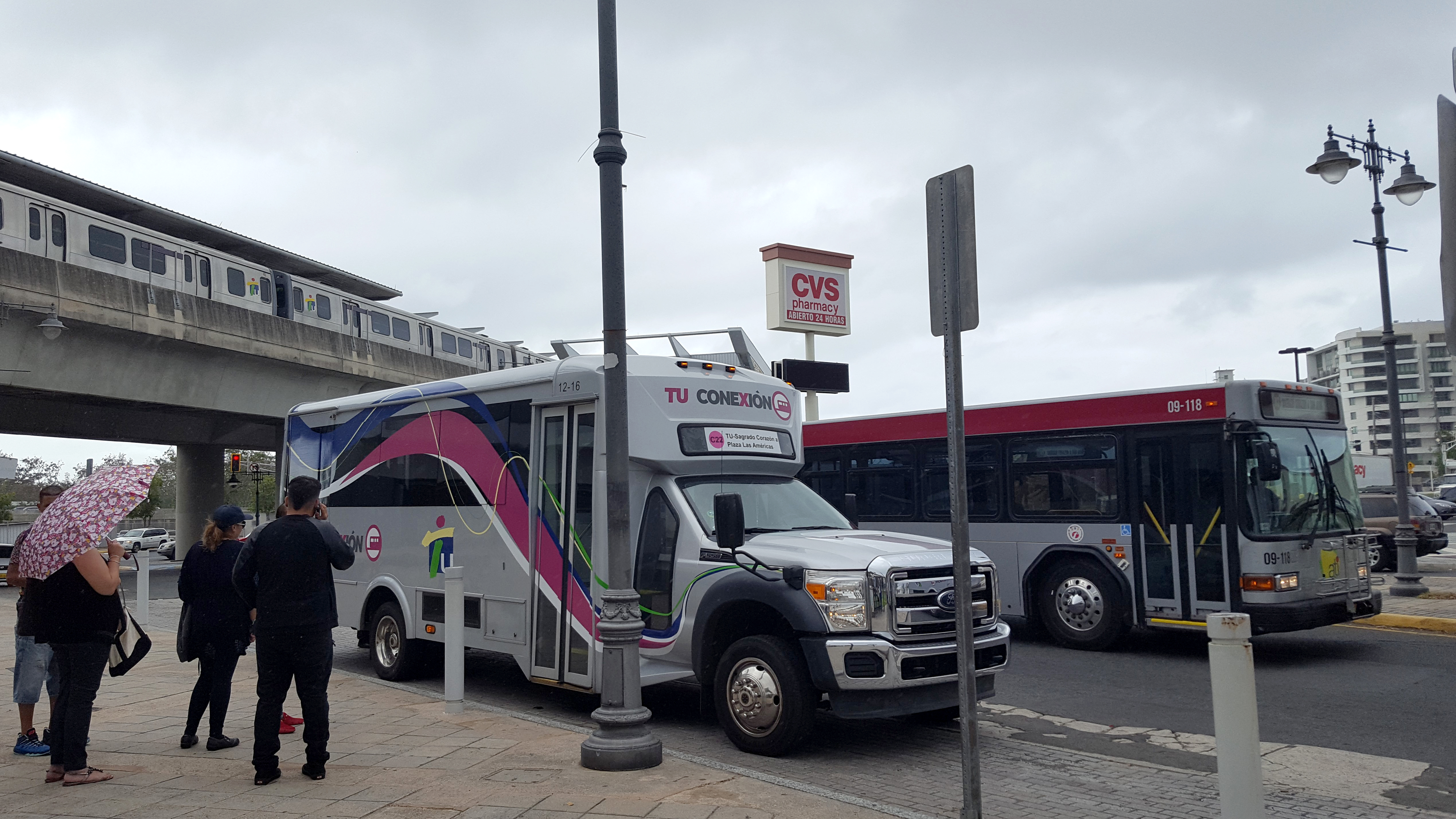
Sagrado Corazón Station

AMA has a total of around 100 buses in its active fleet, with the oldest active fleet model being Orion V built in 2004–2005 and 2007, and the newest being the NovaBus Smart LFS built in 2013. In addition, AMA also operates a large fleet of Orion VII NG built in 2010 and a subfleet of New Flyer DE35LF built in 2005 and 2007.

First Transit, which operates seven routes under contract, works with a fleet of Gillig Low Floors built in 2009, and NABI 42-BRT and 60-BRT for Metro Urbano (E20 route) built in 2012. The 60-BRT will be AMA's first low-floor articulated bus. This will mark only the second-time articulated buses have been used on the island; in 1984 AMA receive their first fleet of articulated buses, the MAN SG-310.

In 2015, AMA introduced the first suburban bus fleet with 33 Ford Super Duty Glaval buses.

TYPE	YEAR	LENGTH
Gillig Low Floor	2009	40'
Orion VII Next Generation	2010	40
NABI 42-BRT	2012	42'
NABI 60-BRT	2012	60'
Ford Super Duty Glaval Suburban Bus	2012	25'
NovaBus Smart LFS	2013–2014, 2019–2020, 2021, 2022, 2024	40'

== Inactive bus fleet ==
TYPE	YEAR	LENGTH
Flxible Twincoach Old Look	1946	35'
GMC Old Look	1953–1954	40'
Mack Trucks Old Look	1955	40'
Mack Trucks New Look	1960	40'
GMC New Look	1962–1963	35'
GMC New Look	1966–1968	35'
Flxible New Look	1970,1972	35'
GMC New Look	1976	35'
GMC RTS II	1980,1983	35'
MAN SG-310	1984	60'
Grumman 870 ADB	1987	40'
Flxible Metro	1988	40'
Flxible Metro	1990	30'
Flxible Metro	1991	35'
TMC Methanol Powered RTS	1992	40'
Flxible Metro	1995	40'
Nova Bus RTS	1997–2000	40'
Nova Bus LFS	1999	40'
Nova Bus RTS	2002	30'
Orion V	2004–2005, 2007	35'
New Flyer DE35LF	2005, 2007	35'

== See also ==
- Tren Urbano
- Cataño Ferry
- Transportation in Puerto Rico
