= North Memphis Driving Park =

Former harness racetrack in Tennessee, U.S.

- Location: Memphis, Shelby County, Tennessee, U.S.
- Owned by: C. K. G. Billings & Frank Graham Jones
- Date opened: October 21, 1901
- Date closed: 1905
- Course type: Harness racing 1 mile clay oval
- Notable races: Memphis Gold Cup

North Memphis Driving Park was an American harness racing track located in Memphis, Shelby County, Tennessee, in the United States.

== History ==
=== Early years ===
The North Memphis Driving Park originated in 1901 when C. K. G. Billings and Frank Graham Jones expanded and replaced Billings Park in Memphis, Tennessee. The park was largely developed by C. K. G. Billings, the son of Albert Merritt Billings, a wealthy Chicago businessman who invested heavily in Memphis's streetcar operation during the 1890s. After the death of his father, Billings inherited a considerable fortune and control of the Memphis Street Railway Company before he expanded into other holdings. In Memphis, Billings' business interests were managed by Frank G. Jones, who had previously been a successful amateur driver and owner of Standardbred horses in Iowa. Growing interest in harness racing led Billings and Jones to establish their own track in 1892, replacing the use of Montgomery Park Race Track, which primarily hosted thoroughbred racing. Known as Billings Park, the half-mile track occupied 27 acres between Dunlap and Manassas streets, south of White Street (now Firestone Boulevard) and north of Marble Street (now Wells Avenue). The property later included the site of Manassas High School. The track was operated by the Memphis Fair and Exposition Company, later known as the Memphis Fair and Trotters Association, with F. G. Jones serving as president. The company failed and later reorganized.

The Memphis Driving Park Club was organized as a social club in connection with the new trotting track, modeled after the Country Club at Montgomery Park Race Track. The club was established in 1901 with A. S. Caldwell as president, J. S. Dunscomb as vice president, J. P. Edrington as secretary, and C. H. Raine as treasurer.

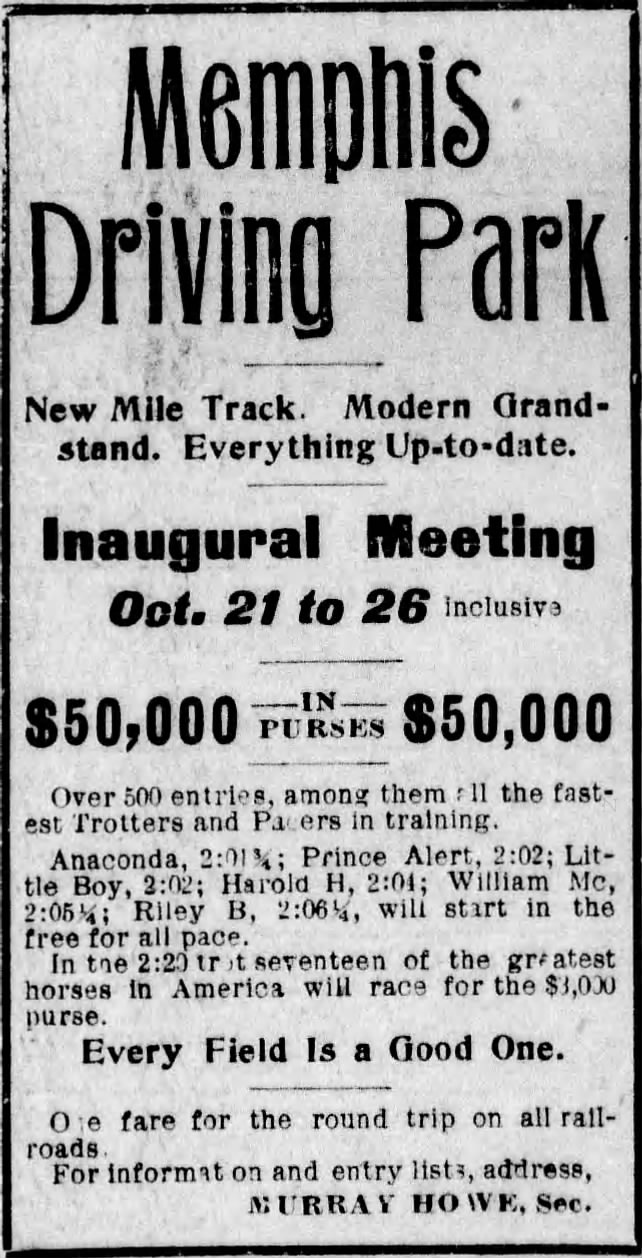
Advertisement for the inaugural meeting of North Memphis Driving Park, October 1901

The original Memphis Driving Club held its first races at the Billings Park half-mile track before moving to the North Memphis Driving Park. The driving park was situated near the junction of Thomas Street and Firestone Boulevard. It had a one-mile course designed for harness racing. It was built by Seth Griffin, a track builder known as the "father of fast raceways". The track was officially opened on October 21, 1901. Murray Howe, a writer for Horse Review, served as racing secretary. Following its opening in 1901, North Memphis Driving Park hosted Grand Circuit racing annually through 1904.

The clay racing surface was regarded as one of the fastest on the Grand Circuit. New world records were established during the inaugural season at North Memphis Driving Park, bringing national attention to Memphis as a center for harness racing. The favorable climate also encouraged owners and trainers to winter their horses in the city. The North Memphis Driving Park hosted two world-record performances in 1903. Lou Dillon trotted a mile in 1:58½, while Dan Patch, driven by Ed Geers, later paced a mile in 1:56¼. During its short history, the oval was the site of 42 world records.

=== Memphis Gold Cup ===
Attendance and public interest increased further during the 1902 season with the introduction of the Memphis Gold Cup, offered as the world championship prize for amateur drivers. The competition soon developed into a notable rivalry between C. K. G. Billings and Elmer E. Smathers of the New York Driving Club. Billings donated the Gold Cup prize. The trophy, which stood nearly a foot high and had three handles, was designed by the Gorham Company and valued at $5,000. The driving club whose representative won the cup twice would gain permanent possession of the trophy. The first running of the Memphis Cup took place at the North Memphis Driving Park on October 27, 1902. Smathers' Lord Derby defeated Billings' The Monk. The two horsemen met again on October 20, 1903, before an estimated crowd of 12,000, a record turnout for a race in Tennessee. Billings' Lou Dillon defeated Smathers' Major Delmar in two heats. The third edition of the Memphis Gold Cup determined which club would gain permanent possession of the trophy. The Memphis Gold Cup winner was decided on October 18, 1904. Billings raced Lou Dillon in both heats despite the horse reportedly being ill before the event. Major Delmar won after Lou Dillon struggled in the second heat, securing the trophy permanently for Smathers. The result was disputed by the Memphis Trotting Association, which sued Smathers on the grounds that Lou Dillon had been incapacitated during the race. After the trial, the jury ruled in Smathers' favor.

=== Other Sports ===
The track hosted Memphis's first automobile speed trial in 1904.

When planning the North Memphis Driving Park in 1898, F. G. Jones offered the infield for use as a golf course. Between 1903 and 1904, a golf club had been established within the center of the racetrack. The makeshift nine-hole course was the foundation of the Memphis Country Club in 1905.

=== Closure ===
The entire North Memphis Driving Park season of 1905 was cancelled. In the spring of 1905, the Tennessee legislature outlawed gambling. Billings withdrew from business and horse racing in Memphis. Frank G. Jones became the racetrack's sole owner. Racing subsequently continued for several years at the Tri-State Fair under an exemption for races conducted for charitable purposes.

The level grounds of the former golf course within the infield were repurposed as a makeshift landing field. The United States Army used the North Memphis Driving Park for aviation training and flight operations in the early months of 1917. It served as a landing strip until the facilities at Millington's Park Field were completed.

An aviation school was opened at the site by the Memphis Aerial Co. on April 1, 1920. It gave Memphis the distinction of having the largest flying school in the entire South.

In November 1923, North Memphis Driving Park hosted the first polo match held in Memphis. The exhibition featured the Robinsonville Four and the Memphis Freebooters and was part of efforts to promote the sport in the Mid-South region.

The North Memphis Driving Park was used as a training ground for local horsemen and their harness horses. Its barns provided winter quarters for several trainers. By the end of 1925, Grand Circuit reinsman Lon McDonald had the largest string quartered there including world's champion trotter Peter Manning. The stables at the Driving Park continued to serve as winter quarters until 1929. The steel grandstand was moved to the Jackson fairgrounds.

In 1928, the Murray Corporation of America acquired 44 acres in the southwest corner of the North Memphis Driving Park grounds from the estate of Frank G. Jones for the construction of a proposed $2,000,000 plant.

Memphis's Driving Park Court was named after the former North Memphis Driving Park. The street runs westward from Thomas Street, north of Royal Avenue.

== Gallery ==
North Memphis Driving Park (Race Track), 1450 North Thomas Street, Memphis, Shelby County, TN
