= William H. Gocher =

Canadian-American harness racing journalist and executive (1864–1937)

- Born: William Henry Gocher; February 4, 1864; Richmond, Ontario, Canada
- Died: November 20, 1937 (aged 73); Hartford, Connecticut, U.S.
- Occupations: Journalist, author, harness racing executive
- Known for: Secretary of the National Trotting Association
- Notable work: 2:30 Book and Table of Sires; Trotalong; Pacealong; Racealong

William Henry Gocher (February 4, 1864 – November 20, 1937) was a Canadian-born American journalist, author, and harness racing executive. After working for sporting newspapers in Chicago and Cleveland, he became secretary of the National Trotting Association in 1895 and remained in the position for more than four decades. He was elected an Immortal of the United States Harness Racing Hall of Fame in 1979.

== Early life and education ==
William Henry Gocher was born on February 4, 1864, in Richmond, Ontario, Canada. He was the son of Frederick Gocher, a native of London, England, and Margaret Templeton, a native of Belfast. He attended schools in Kemptville, Ontario, and worked as a schoolteacher for several years before entering the field of journalism.

== Career ==
=== Journalism career ===
In 1881 Gocher began his journalism career as an editor of the Canadian Sportsman in Toronto, Ontario. He later moved to the United States as a young man and worked for several newspapers devoted to horse racing. In 1886, he became associate editor of the New York Sportsman, and in 1889 was appointed editor of the Chicago Horseman in Illinois. The following year, he founded the American Sportsman in Cleveland, Ohio, serving as its proprietor and editor.

=== Harness racing career ===
Gocher developed a particular interest in harness racing and began compiling records of trotters and pacers, their owners and breeders, and their racing performances. In 1894, he published 2:30 Book and Table of Sires, a compilation of trotters and pacers with records of 2:30 or faster, along with lists of sires, money winners, and world-record holders.

In 1895 Gocher was elected secretary of the National Trotting Association. He also became an American citizen that year. In December 1895, he sold his interest in The American Sportsman and moved to Hartford, Connecticut, early the following year.

As secretary of the National Trotting Association, Gocher distributed a periodical newsletter that supplied newspapers and magazines throughout the United States and Canada with news from the harness racing industry.

Gocher was active in Hartford's local horsemen's organizations. During the early 1900s, he was serving as president of the Road Drivers' Club of Hartford.

Gocher was also involved in civic affairs in Hartford. In 1909, he served with former Connecticut governor Morgan G. Bulkeley on the committee overseeing celebrations for the opening of the Connecticut River Bridge, where he was responsible for seating part of the large crowd. He also served for many years as secretary of the Connecticut Fair Association and was involved with the Blue Hills Improvement Association.

He was named treasurer of the National Trotting Association in 1915 and remained in his secretary role until 1937. He took part in developing and overseeing the association's racing policies. He also became active in the Grand Circuit and the sale of Standardbred horses.

Gocher continued to write on harness racing alongside his administrative work, contributing numerous articles to the Hartford Courant over the following decades.

=== Writing career ===
In 1903 Gocher published Fasig's Tales of the Turf, based on the writings and recollections of horseman and auctioneer William B. Fasig. The volume included a memoir of Fasig as well as accounts of the Cleveland Driving Park, the Grand Circuit, and the development of Fasig's horse sales. A second volume, Wet Sundays, was also published in 1903.

In 1904 Gocher wrote Wadsworth; or, The Charter Oak, a book examining the legend surrounding the hiding of Connecticut's colonial charter. He based portions of the work on papers he said had been discovered among the possessions of descendants of the Wadsworth family.

Gocher's Trotalong, published in 1928, traced the history of trotting in the United States, while the companion volume Pacealong focused on pacing. He followed the two volumes with Racealong in 1930.

== Death and legacy ==
W. H. Gocher died in Hartford, Connecticut, United States, in November 1937 at the age of 73. His death was attributed to coronary thrombosis.

In 1979 Gocher was elected to the Hall of Immortals of the United States Harness Racing Hall of Fame.

== Selected works ==
- 2:30 Book and Table of Sires (1894)
- Fasig's Tales of the Turf (1903)
- Wet Sundays (1903)
- Wadsworth; or, The Charter Oak (1904)
- Trotalong (1928)
- Pacealong (1928)
- Racealong (1930)
