= Glenville Race Track =

Former harness racing track in Cleveland, Ohio

- Glenville Race Track in 1875
- Location: Glenville, Ohio, U.S.
- Date opened: 1870
- Date closed: 1908
- Race type: Harness racing
- Course type: One-mile oval

Glenville Race Track, also known as the Cleveland Driving Park, was a harness racing track in Glenville, Ohio, United States. The one-mile oval opened in 1870 and was constructed by the Northern Ohio Fair Association as part of its fairgrounds. The track became an early member of the circuit that developed into the Grand Circuit.

== History ==
The Glenville Race Track originated with the Northern Ohio Fair Association, which was incorporated in 1870 after the Ohio State Board of Agriculture rejected Cleveland's request to host the state fair that year. The Cleveland Driving Park Company constructed the track for use in connection with the Northern Ohio Fair. Among those involved as early stockholders were Frank Rockefeller, John D. Rockefeller, William Rockefeller, J. V. Painter, Warren Corning, Charles A. Brayton, Howard M. Hanna, and Sylvester T. Everett. The first president of the Cleveland Driving Park Co. was Tom Axworthy with Sam Briggs serving as its first racing secretary.

The association raised $300,000 and acquired approximately 87 acres along St. Clair Avenue between Doan Brook and the village of Glenville, Ohio. Fair buildings were constructed on the property, while the racecourse was laid out on the south side of St. Clair Avenue. The Northern Ohio Fairgrounds stood across the street and were connected with the racing grounds by a bridge. The first fair opened on October 4, 1870.

Glenville Race Track joined tracks in Buffalo, Rochester, and Utica to form the Quadrilateral Circuit in 1872. The association became part of the Grand Circuit within the following year, placing Glenville Race Track among the leading harness racing venues on the circuit. One of the track's most notable races took place in July 1876, when Smuggler competed against Goldsmith Maid. Smuggler defeated the mare in a race that was later commemorated in verse by Oliver Wendell Holmes Sr.

In 1876, Col. William "Billy" Edwards was elected president of the Cleveland Driving Park Co. Over the years, Col. Edwards also served as a starter and presiding judge at harness racing events. After operating for roughly a decade, the Northern Ohio Fair Association dissolved during the winter of 1880–81 because of financial difficulties. Although the fairgrounds were abandoned, the Cleveland Driving Park continued to draw spectators, with harness racing remaining its principal attraction. By 1882, William B. Fasig was serving as its racing secretary.

On July 30, 1885, Maud S., owned by William Henry Vanderbilt, trotted a mile in 2:08 3/4 at the track, establishing a world record. The mark stood for six years. The track commemorated the mare's performance with a replica of her head enclosed by a horseshoe showing the record time above the main gate. Other prominent trotters that appeared at Glenville included Cresceus and Lou Dillon.

Automobiles lined up at Glenville Race Track in September 1903

Amateur harness racing became another important feature of the track during the 1890s. The Gentlemen's Driving Club of Cleveland was organized in May 1895. It marked the organization of the first amateur driving club in the United States. Its members held regular competitions at Glenville Race Track, which held its first race on June 29, 1895. Members included J. H. Hoyt, Gen. D. W. Caldwell, H. K. Devereux, W. G. Pollock, O. G. Kent, D. R. Hanna, and C. A. Otis. Devereaux also served as president of the Gentlemen's Driving Club.

Glenville became an early venue for automobile racing and vehicle testing. Locally manufactured Winton and Baker Electric automobiles were among the vehicles run at the track. A three-day automobile meeting in September 1903 drew competitors including Barney Oldfield, who won several events while driving a Winton.

== Decline and closure ==
Before Glenville's annexation to the City of Cleveland, Frederick H. Goff had campaigned for mayor on a platform of suppressing gambling at the track in Glenville. After he was elected, the Glenville village council subsequently authorized the appointment of 50 special police officers to enforce the anti-betting campaign. The Glenville mayor first brought proceedings to prevent betting at the track's Grand Circuit meeting in July 1903. The Cleveland Driving Park Company agreed that no gambling for profit would be allowed during the meeting. Efforts to repeal the anti-pool laws during the administration of former Ohio governor Myron T. Herrick were unsuccessful. Racing activity continued in reduced form for several years, including automobile competitions. When Glenville became part of Cleveland, the laws were enforced more strictly. Mayor Tom L. Johnson later directed Cleveland's chief of police in July 1905 to stop pool selling and other gambling activities at Glenville Race Track. After 1905, the state law against betting made the races unprofitable.

By November 1907, the Cleveland Driving Park Company had largely decided to discontinue Grand Circuit racing at Glenville after meetings held without betting resulted in financial losses. While the final racing season was in 1908, amateur contests continued until 1916. The operators of Glenville Race Track had announced in April 1908 that the course would be abandoned in favor of a new racing facility at North Randall, Ohio. In 1909, the Cleveland Driving Park Company conveyed the former race track property to real estate dealer W. J. Crawford for residential development. The site was to be divided into building lots, and by then the grandstand and seating had already been demolished, leaving little trace of the old course.

The former racecourse property was later redeveloped. Miles Standish Elementary School, opened in 1921, and Empire Junior High School were constructed on portions of the former grounds.
