= Edward A. Tipton =

American harness racing executive and horse auctioneer (1856–1930)

- Born: 1856; Mount Sterling, Kentucky, U.S.
- Died: October 13, 1930 (aged 73–74); Lexington, Kentucky, U.S.
- Occupations: Horseman, racing executive, horse auctioneer
- Known for: Fasig-Tipton

Edward A. Tipton (1856 – October 1930) was an American horseman, harness racing executive, and horse auctioneer. He served as secretary and later president of the Kentucky Trotting Horse Breeders' Association, established the Kentucky Futurity and Transylvania Trot, and became a partner in the horse-sales firm Fasig-Tipton.

== Early life and education ==
Edward A. Tipton was born in Montgomery County, near Mount Sterling, Kentucky, United States, in 1856. He was the son of Samuel E. and Louise Wilkerson Tipton.

During Tipton's childhood, his father relocated the family to Paris, Kentucky, where he was employed as a cutter at Allen Bashford's tailor shop. From an early age, he developed an extensive knowledge of the breeding and pedigrees of trotting horses and assembled a large library on the subject. His early interest in pedigrees was encouraged by Bashford, himself a breeder, who had Tipton compile breeding records for horsemen in Bourbon County.

He was educated at the private school of W. L. Yerkes in Paris, Kentucky, before graduating with honors from Transylvania College.

== Career ==
=== Harness racing career ===
When the Kentucky Trotting Horse Breeders' Association was reorganized in 1887, Tipton became its racing secretary. In that position he helped revive the association's racing meetings at Lexington, Kentucky. He was also involved in establishing the Transylvania Trot and Kentucky Futurity stakes, first known as the Stallion Representative Stakes. Tipton inaugurated the Transylvania in 1889 as a feature race for older trotters with fast records, naming the event after his alma mater. He later framed the rules and conditions for the inaugural Kentucky Futurity in 1891. Although the event was initially projected to be worth $15,000, his efforts to secure nominations increased its value to over $26,000.

Tipton resigned as secretary of the Kentucky Trotting Horse Breeders' association in 1895 to work for businessman and horse breeder Marcus Daly. He managed Daly's Bitter Root Stud in Anaconda, Montana and remained associated with the operation until Daly's death in the early 1900s. He was commissioned to select and purchase trotting-bred horses. Among the notable horses he selected was Willy Wilkes, a son of George Wilkes, drawing on his knowledge of pedigrees and breeding values. While superintendent of the breeding establishment, he served as secretary of the Anaconda Racing Association.

In February 1896, Tipton was appointed to a National Trotting Association committee tasked with reviewing the association's racing rules and proposing changes. During this period, Tipton helped introduce a rule allowing horses to establish official records in supervised time trials without affecting their race classification.

Tipton was among the organizers of the Butte Horsemen's Association in 1897, a Montana corporation established to conduct horse breeding, training, sales, and related activities. He managed race meetings at Anaconda and Butte, two of the principal racing centers on the Montana circuit.

=== Fasig-Tipton ===
Tipton acquired an interest in William B. Fasig's horse-sales business in the late 1890s, after which the firm became known as the Fasig-Tipton Company. The firm conducted sales of Standardbreds, Thoroughbreds, and road and carriage horses, including sales at Madison Square Garden in New York City.

Tipton was elected president of Fasig-Tipton in February 1902, filling the vacancy created by the death of his late business partner, W. B. Fasig. He was succeeded as treasurer by Edward M. Stalker. He continued to lead the horse-auctioning firm and later entered into partnership with Enoch James Tranter.

During his time in New York, Tipton advised William Bradley on the establishment of Ardmaer Stud Farm.

=== K.T.H.B.A ===
When the Kentucky Trotting Horse Breeders' Association faced reorganization and proposals to sell its grounds for real estate development, he led an effort to purchase and reorganize the association. He sold his interest in Fasig-Tipton in 1911 and returned to the Kentucky Trotting Horse Breeders' Association as its president. He remained in that position until his retirement in 1926.

Upon his return to Lexington, he assisted C. K. G. Billings in the formation of his Curles Neck Farm. In 1914, Billings appointed Tipton general superintendent of his Curles Neck stock farm in Richmond, Virginia, where he was placed in charge of the farm's horse operations. He succeeded Dr. Charles Tanner. He was responsible for selecting and purchasing broodmares to be bred to the world's champion stallion The Harvester. He also served as an adviser on horse breeding to Leland Stanford.

== Death ==
Edward A. Tipton died in Lexington, Kentucky, on October 13, 1930, at the age of 75.

== Legacy ==
Tipton was inducted into the United States Harness Racing Hall of Fame as an Immortal in 1959.
