= Montgomery Park =

Montgomery Park may refer to:

- Montgomery Park (Portland, Oregon), a building in Oregon, United States
- Montgomery Park, Ontario, a community within the town of Mississippi Mills, Ontario, Canada
- Montgomery Park Race Track, a horse racing track in Memphis, Tennessee
