= Belz Enterprises =

American company

Belz Enterprises, Inc. is a major American-based developer of hotels, retail, and commercial properties, including shopping malls.

Belz owns and operates the Peabody Hotel in Memphis. Previously they operated two other Peabody Hotels, one in Little Rock, and another in Orlando, however both of these hotels were sold in 2013 becoming a Hyatt and Mariott respectively. In past years, much of its operations have been centered on the development of new factory outlet type malls, such as the Belz Factory Outlet World in Canovanas, Puerto Rico opened in 2001 which is now known as The Outlet 66 Mall, and the conversion of some its older traditional properties into such. Another Belz outlet project was the Belz Factory Outlet Mall in Allen, Texas, which opened in November 1983 through a partnership involving Belz Investment Company of Memphis and Pic Investment Corp. The project comprised roughly 346,000 sq ft of retail space and was planned for 50-60 stores. The Belz Factory Outlet Mall-Allen later declined and reportedly closed around 1987.

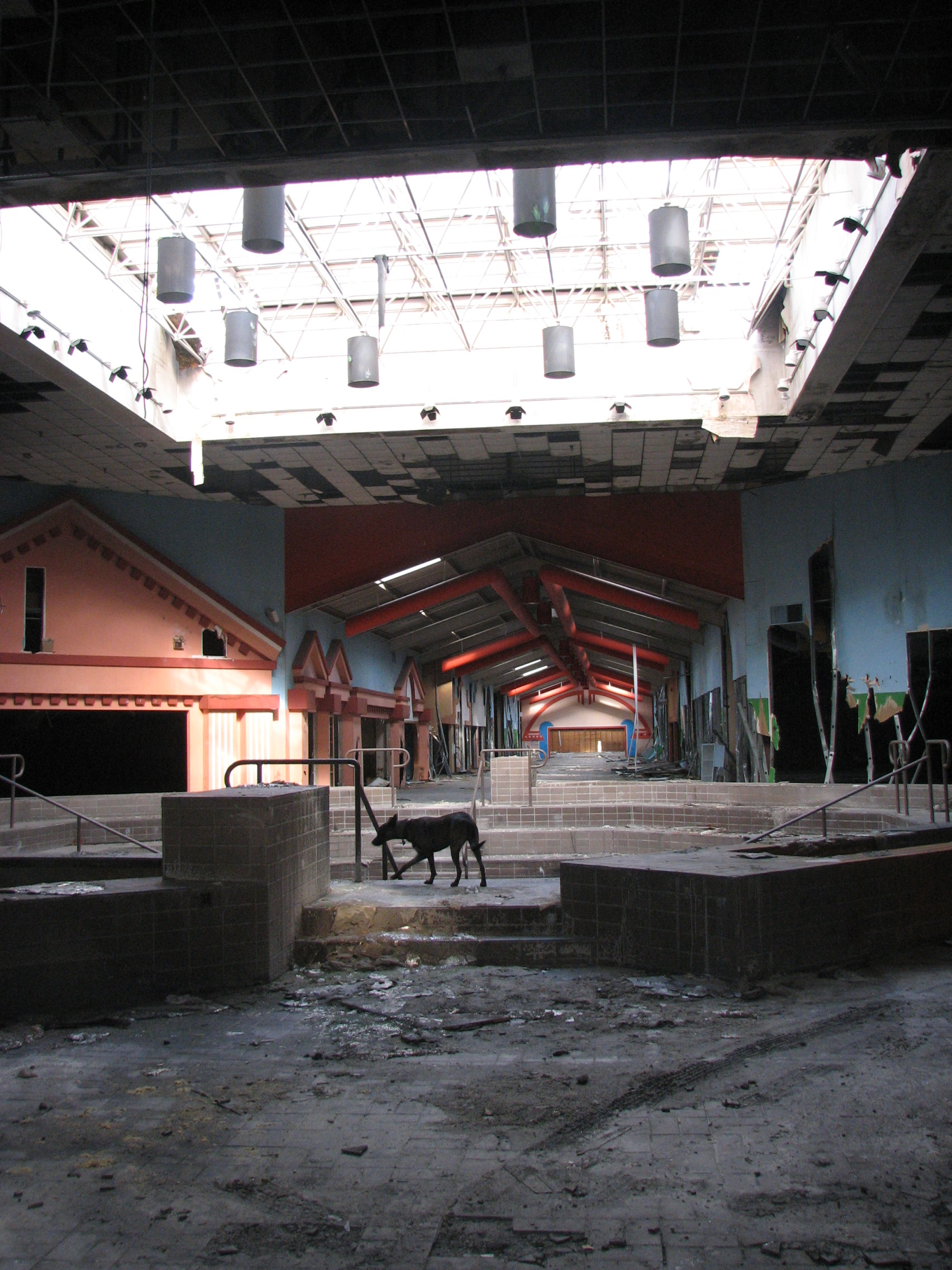
Interior atrium of the former Belz Factory Outlet Mall in Allen, Texas, photographed in 2009.

In recent years they have developed more traditional shopping centers including strip malls and Peabody Place in downtown Memphis, commercial office, and warehouses space. The firm is based in Memphis. Ronald A. Belz is Chief Operating Officer.

== History ==
North Memphis Driving Park (horse racing track), later site of early Belz Enterprises projects

The company was founded in North Memphis in 1940 by Philip Belz (1904–2000). The firm's earliest projects included small retail and residential spaces and soon expanded to industrial development, starting with a roofing materials factory on the former site of the North Memphis Driving Park (horse racing track).
