= MAN SG 220 =

German articulated bus

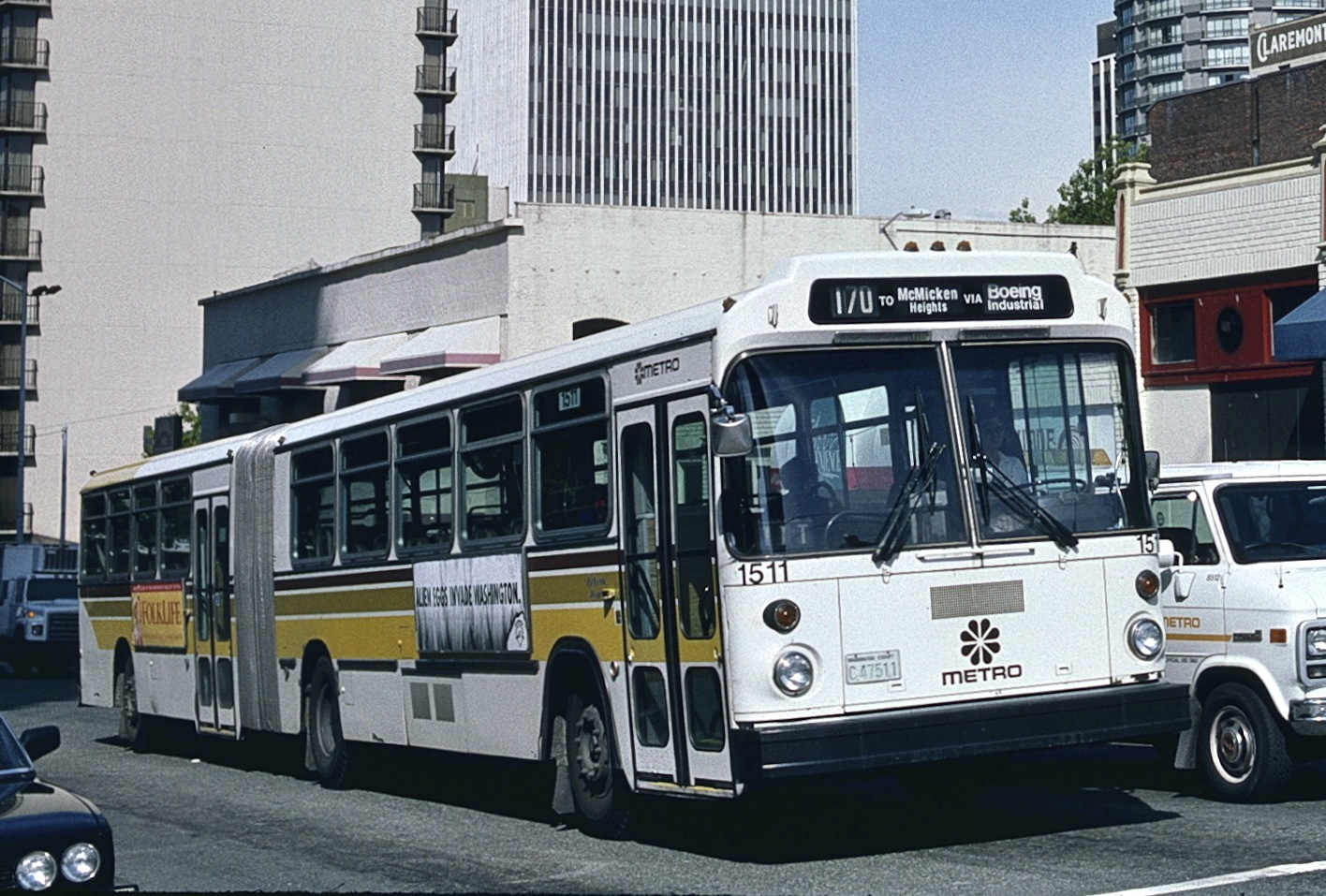
- 1979 MAN SG 220-18-2 for King County Metro in Seattle (photographed in 1994)

Overview
- Manufacturer: MAN SE
- Production: 1978-1983
- Assembly: Germany: Stuttgart; United States: Cleveland, North Carolina (final assembly)

Body and chassis
- Class: Transit bus
- Related: MAN SG 310

Powertrain
- Engine: M.A.N. D2566 MLUM/US, 696 cu in (11.4 L) I-6, 305 hp (227 kW) @ 2000 rpm
- Transmission: 4-speed automatic Renk Doromat 874A (SG 220) or 874B (SG 310)

Dimensions
- Wheelbase: 222.4 in (5.65 m) (F, SG 220); 225.5 in (5.73 m) (R, SG 220-16.5); 18 ft 6 in (5.64 m) (F, SG 310); 18 ft 8 in (5.69 m) (55' R, SG 310); 23 ft 9 in (7.24 m) (60' R, SG 310)
- Length: 54.1 or 59.1 ft (16.5 or 18 m)
- Width: 102 in (2.59 m)
- Height: 125 in (3.18 m)
- Curb weight: 37,800 lb (17,100 kg) SG 220; 52,650 lb (23,880 kg) GVWR, SG 220; 59,525 lb (27,000 kg) GAWR, SG 310

Chronology
- Predecessor: MAN SG 192
- Successor: MAN SG 240 H

The MAN SG 220 was a VöV-Standard articulated bus designed and manufactured by Maschinenfabrik Augsburg-Nürnberg (MAN) in Germany between 1978 and 1983, available with two, three, or four doors in two different lengths. The bus was also exported to different countries, built locally in France, Slovenia, Turkey, and the United States.

In the American market, in order to meet Urban Mass Transportation Administration "Buy America" requirements for federally-subsidized vehicles, the initial set of vehicles were shipped as driveable shells and finished in the United States by AM General in Texas until 1979. After the joint venture with AM General ended, MAN opened its own assembly plant in Cleveland, North Carolina to produce the SG 220 and its closely related derivative SG 310 (starting in 1981) until it abruptly withdrew from the United States transit bus market in 1988.

== Design ==
The full model number describes the type, generation, length, and number of doors:

Type	Generation	Length	Doors
SG = Stadt Gelenke ("City Joints", articulated bus)	220; 310	16.5 = 16.5 m (54 ft) long 18 = 18 m (59 ft) long	2 = 2 doors 3 = 3 doors 4 = 4 doors

Hence a SG 220-18-3 is an articulated bus 18 m (59 ft) long with three doors. Potential door locations are (from the front proceeding to the back):

1. Ahead of the front axle, behind the windshield
2. Ahead of the middle axle
3. Behind the articulation, ahead of the rear axle
4. Behind the rear axle

In the United States, the number of doors was limited to two or three, corresponding to locations 1-x-3-x or 1-2-3-x. The SG 310 was offered with two doors, in locations 1-x-3-x.

Both the SG 220 and 310 were high-floor "puller" type articulated buses, with the middle axle driven. The SG 220 and 310 were equipped with a MAN D2566 MLUM/US inline-6 turbodiesel engine, rated at 305 hp (227 kW).

== History ==
=== United States ===
The AC Transit District serving Alameda and Contra Costa counties in the San Francisco Bay Area began using an over-the-road articulated coach in Transbay service in 1966; subsequently, AC Transit was one of six transit districts to develop a "super bus" specification in the early 1970s for a higher-capacity bus. A pooled purchase was intended to reduce per-unit development costs. Two European-built articulated buses were tested by AC Transit and Seattle's Metro Transit in the summer of 1974: one based on the Volvo B58 chassis, and the MAN SG 192. Riders received the MAN bus favorably, and the specification was released for bid in 1975; the pooled purchase consortium, which by then had grown to encompass ten transit districts, awarded the order to AM General in August 1976. Deliveries of the AM General/MAN joint venture SG 220 articulated buses began in 1978.

Buses were shipped from Germany as "driveable shells" and finished by AM General according to customer specifications. AM General terminated the joint venture agreement, taking effect after the delivery of the Seattle buses, and MAN opened a manufacturing plant in Cleveland, North Carolina in October 1981, with an anticipated capacity of 400 buses per year. MAN withdrew from the US transit bus market in 1988 after an order of 40-ft buses for Chicago was blocked by an injunction. The Cleveland plant was sold in 1989 to Daimler subsidiary Freightliner Trucks.

== Operators ==
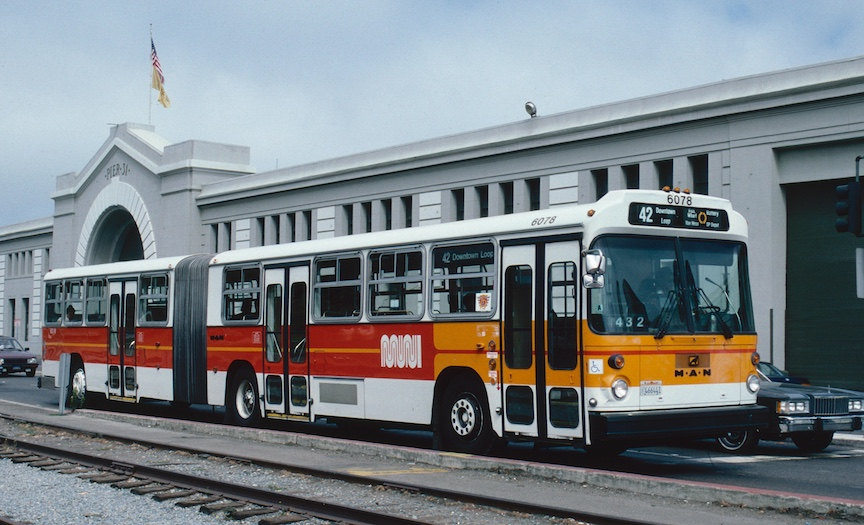
An MAN SG-310 bus of the San Francisco Municipal Railway in 1987

=== United States ===
Several operators in the United States formed a pooled purchase consortium and awarded the bid to the AM General/MAN joint venture (the sole bidder) for over two hundred buses. By March 15, 1982, 511 articulated buses from all manufacturers had been delivered in the United States; of these buses delivered, 399 were MAN/AM General buses. Orders had been placed for an additional 692 articulated buses; of those pending orders, 557 were MAN buses.

Although operating experience with the eleven initial operators showed the per-passenger labor costs of driving the articulated bus were reduced compared with conventional buses, the articulated bus cost was almost double that of a conventional bus, required maintenance was more frequent and more costly, and dwell times were increased.

United States MAN operators
City	System	Award date (Note: Ten members of the Pooled Purchase Consortium placed orders with AM General for 234 buses in 1976. This excludes the 151 buses ordered by the Municipality of Metropolitan Seattle (Metro Transit).)	Fleet Nos	Qty	Model	PPC
Atlanta, GA	MARTA	September 24, 1976	1601-1610	10 (Note: Sold to CATS in 1990.)	55' (SG 220-16.5-2A)	Yes
Chicago, IL	CTA	February 14, 1977	7000-7019	20	55' (SG 220-16.5-2A)	Yes
Chicago, IL	CTA	October 1980	7100-7224	125	55' (SG 310-16.5-2L)	No
Denver, CO	RTD	July 1981	9001-9089	89	60' (SG 310-18)	No
Indianapolis, IN	IPTC	July 1981	8401-8430	30 (Note: 8 sold to Des Moines Area Regional Transit in 1994.)	60' (SG 310-18)	No
Los Angeles, CA	SCRTD	August 27, 1976	9200-9229	30	60' (SG 220-18-3A)	Yes
Memphis, TN	MATA	July 1981	500-519	20	60' (SG 310-18)	No
Minneapolis, MN	MTC	August 30, 1976	1001-1020	20	60' (SG 220-18-2A)	Yes
Minneapolis, MN	MTC	August 1981	1021-1082	62	60' (SG 310-18-2L)	No
Nashville, TN	KTRANS	July 1981	101-115	15	55' (SG 310-16.5-2A)	No
Oakland, CA	AC Transit	September 7, 1976	1600-1629	30	60' (SG 220-18-2A)	Yes
Phoenix, AZ	PTS	October 12, 1976	7001-7020	20	60' (SG 220-18-2A)	Yes
Phoenix, AZ	PTS	1983	7021-7056	36	55' (SG 310-16.5-2A)	No
Pittsburgh, PA	PA Transit	February 28, 1977	3000-3019	30	55' (SG 220-16.5-2A)	Yes
Pittsburgh, PA	PA Transit	July 1981	3050-3079	30	55' (SG 310-16.5-2L)	No
Rochester, NY	RGRTA	1984	301-317	17	60' (SG 310-18-2A)	No
San Diego, CA	SDTC	August 30, 1976	1001-1045	45	60' (SG 220-18-2A)	Yes
San Francisco, CA	Muni	1983	6000-6099	100	60' (SG 310-18)	No
San Jose, CA	SCCTD	July 1981	2401-2415	15 (Note: Sold to AC Transit in 1988.)	60' (SG 310-18)	No
San Juan, PR	AMA	1984	84801-84812	12	60' (SG 310-18-?)	No
San Rafael, CA	GGBHTD	September 8, 1976	451-460	10 (Note: Sold to SCRTD in 1984.)	60' (SG 220-18-2A)	Yes
Seattle, WA	Metro	August 30, 1976	1400-1550	151	60' (SG 220-18-2A)	Yes
Seattle, WA	Metro	May 1980	2000-2201	202 (Note: 114 sold to CTA in 2000.) (Note: 14 sold to Rutgers University in 2001.)	60' (SG 310-18-2L)	No
Seattle, WA	Metro	1983	4000-4045	46 (Note: Metro was the only operator of MAN trolleybuses in the US.)	60' (SG T310-18)	No
Spokane, WA	STA	1986	210-219	10	60' (SG 310-18-?)	No
Washington, DC	WMATA	August 30, 1976	5001-5043	43	55' (SG 220-16.5-2A)	Yes
Washington, DC	WMATA	July 1981	5101-5133	32	60' (SG 310-18)	No
Westchester County, NY	RTD	August 1981	600-661	62	60' (SG 310-18)	No

== Competition ==
- Crown-Ikarus 286 — In 1982, the only other manufacturer that had delivered an articulated transit bus to a United States transit district was Crown-Ikarus.
