= Charter Oak Park =

Harness racing track in Hartford, Connecticut, US

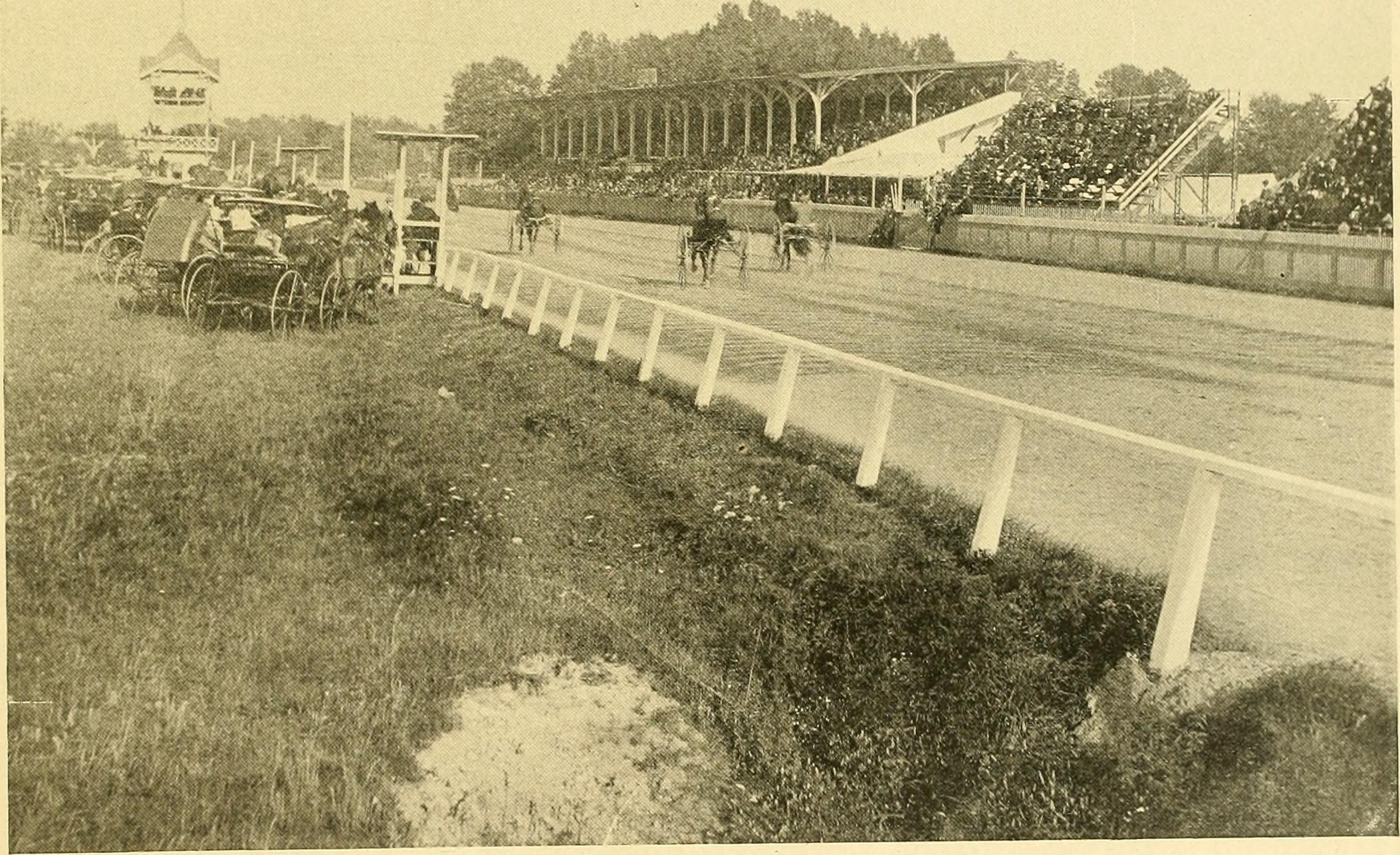
- Charter Oak Park c. 1895
- Interactive map of Charter Oak Park
- Location: Hartford, Connecticut
- Coordinates: 41°44′28″N 72°43′31″W
- Date opened: 1874, 1897
- Date closed: 1893, 1931
- Race type: Harness racing

Charter Oak Park was an American harness racing track in Hartford, Connecticut, that was open from 1874 to 1893, when an anti-gambling bill resulted in its closure. It reopened in 1897 and remained in operation until 1931.

== Early years ==
Charter Oak Park was constructed by the Connecticut Stock Breeders' Association at a cost of around $100,000. The one-mile oval was located on a 143 acre parcel of land located two-miles from Hartford's business district. The grandstand had a seating capacity of 4,000 and room for an extra 2,000 patrons. The area under the stands was fitted for use by agricultural fairs. The park opened on August 25, 1874. Goldsmith Maid won the final race of the first meet.

Ebenzer Roberts, Burdett Loomis, and William H. Peck each served as track president during its early years. Alexander Harbison was president from 1878 until 1885, when Morgan Bulkeley won a proxy battle to become president of the Connecticut Stock Breeders' Association. Charter Oak Park was a member of the Grand Circuit from 1876 to 1894.

In addition to holding harness races, Charter Oak Park also hosted college track and field events and bicycle races. From 1874 to 1881 the Connecticut Agricultural Society used the park to host the Connecticut State Fair.

== First closure ==
In 1893, the passed an Anti-Pool bill. This ended both horse racing and bicycle racing at Charter Oak Park, as the bill prohibited leasing the property for racing purposes for prizes.

== Reopening ==
On April 4, 1896, the track was purchased at auction by Henry Kennedy for $20,810. Shortly thereafter, the park was acquired by Andrew J. Welch, who hired William B. Fasig as manager. Welch brought horse racing, including Grand Circuit races, back to Charter Oak Park in 1897.

On June 16–17, 1905, the track hosted an automobile meet, which included AAA championship race won by Barney Oldfield. The park hosted many other motor races, including a 1911 race between an automobile and a biplane.

In 1906, 12 acres of the Charter Oak property were sold to the Chatford Company for the construction of Luna Park. The amusement park attracted controversy by operating on Sundays in defiance of the law. Although illegal, the $50 fine was much less than what the park would bring in on a Sunday. In 1908, the park was acquired by the Connecticut Fair Association, which ran it until its closure in 1910.

In 1908, the first Connecticut Fair was held at the park. In 1910, Welch sold Charter Oak Park for $175,000 in order to fund a more elaborate fair. The 1911 fair saw President William Howard Taft attend some of the day's Grand Circuit races and deliver a speech. The following year presidential candidates Woodrow Wilson and Theodore Roosevelt and Governor Simeon E. Baldwin spoke at the fair. In 1929, the Connecticut State Fair, which had never been financially successful, was canceled. The Grand Circuit races were held that August instead of during Labor Day week when the fair was held.

== Closure and demolition ==
In 1931, Chase National Bank took possession of the property. In 1937, Pratt & Whitney purchased Charter Oak Park in order to construct a new factory there. The track buildings were torn down that year and Pratt & Whitney moved into their new factory in 1939.
