= William Edwards (harness racing) =

Businessman and Racing Enthusiast

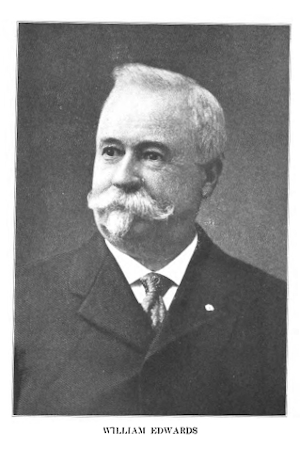

William ("Col. Billy") Edwards (Springfield, Massachusetts, June 6, 1831 – September 21, 1898) was an American businessman in Cleveland, Ohio and horseman. He is noted as being one of the founders of harness racing's Grand Circuit.

== Career ==
Edwards was born in Springfield, the son of Elisha Edwards and Eunice Lombard, who ran a drug store there. He moved to Cleveland in 1852 where he went to work for a wholesale grocer. After a year he went into partnership in a jobbing grocery business that eventually became William Edwards & Company until his death. He was "ranked among the foremost wholesale merchants of the middle west."

During the American Civil War he was a strong Union supporter, and was given the honorary title of "colonel" for his activities in organizing military units. He was a member of the Loyal Legion.

Edwards was active in civic and political affairs in Cleveland, and was one of the commissioners of the World's Columbian Exposition in Chicago, Illinois in 1893.

== Harness racing ==
Edwards was avid horseman. He was president and organizer of the Cleveland Driving Park Association. As president of the Glenville Race Track "a horse has never started but Edwards gave the word." He was "an active member of the Board of Review of the National Trotting Association," and a steward of the Grand Circuit races.

"He is credited with introducing the pacer to Grand Circuit racing in 1878."

He is a member of the Harness Racing Hall of Fame.
