= Sagrado Corazón / Monteflores (Santurce) =

Subbarrios of Santurce in San Juan, Puerto Rico

- Subbarrio
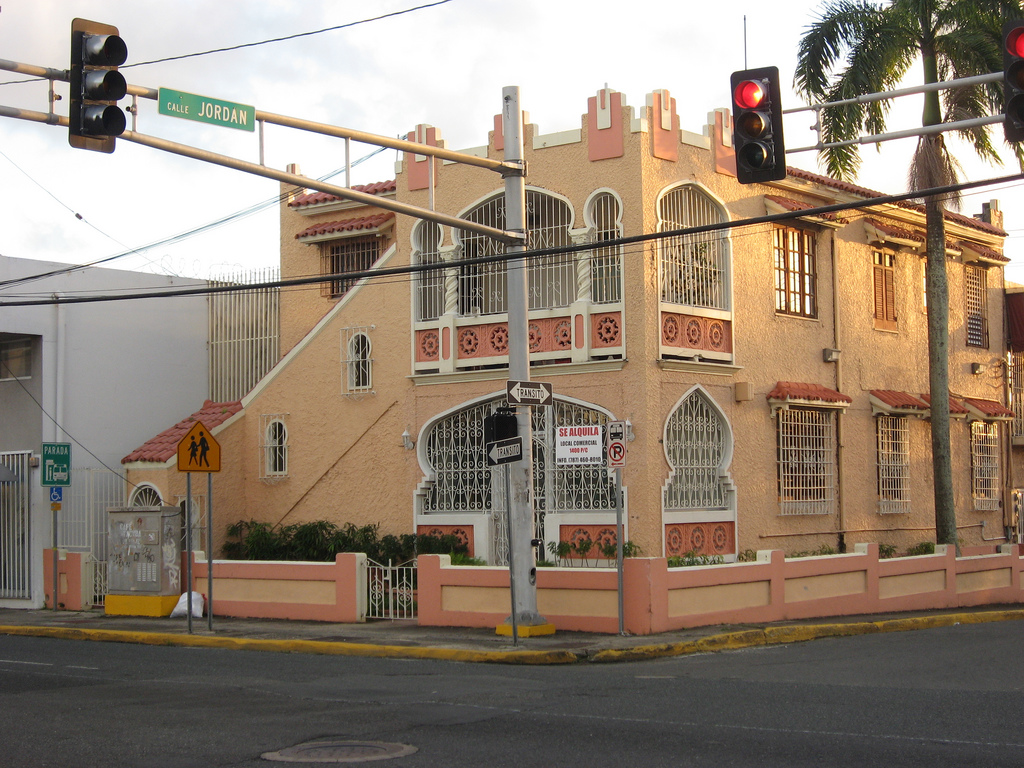
- Orange house at intersection of Calle Jordan and Ave Manuel Fernandez Juncos in Sagrado Corazon

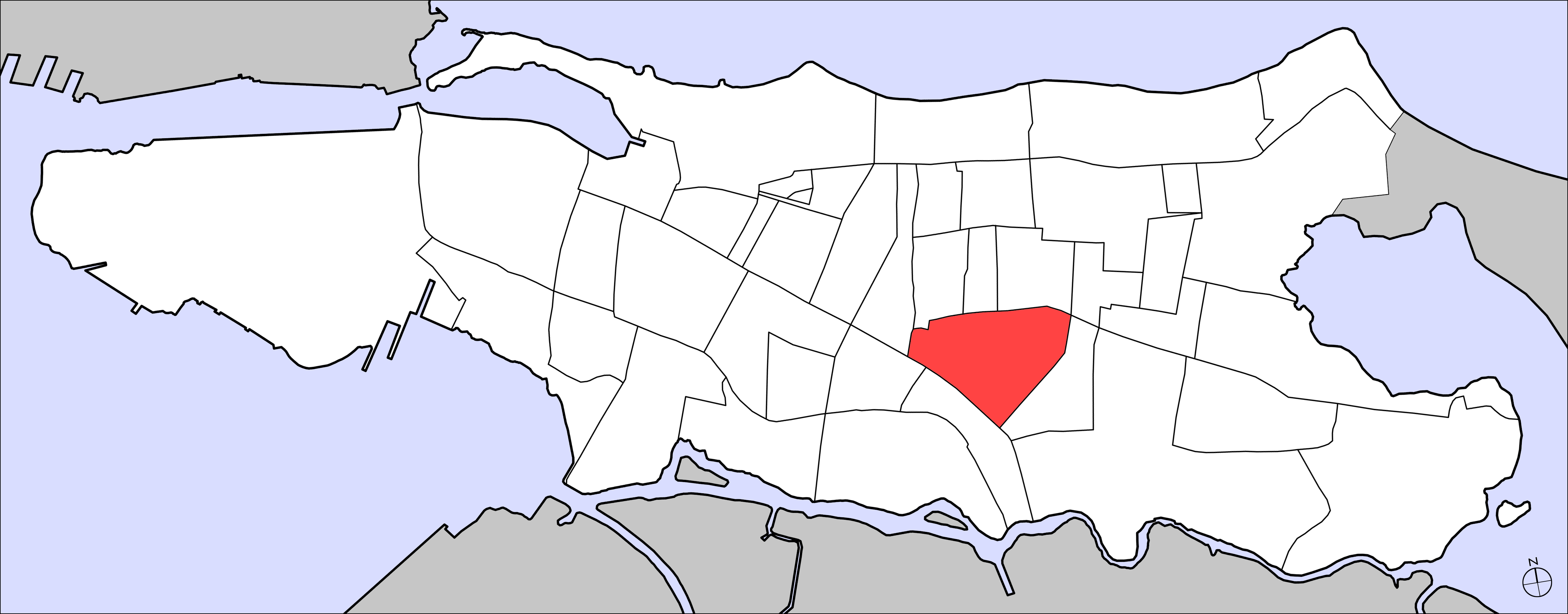
- Location of Sagrado Corazón within the District of Santurce

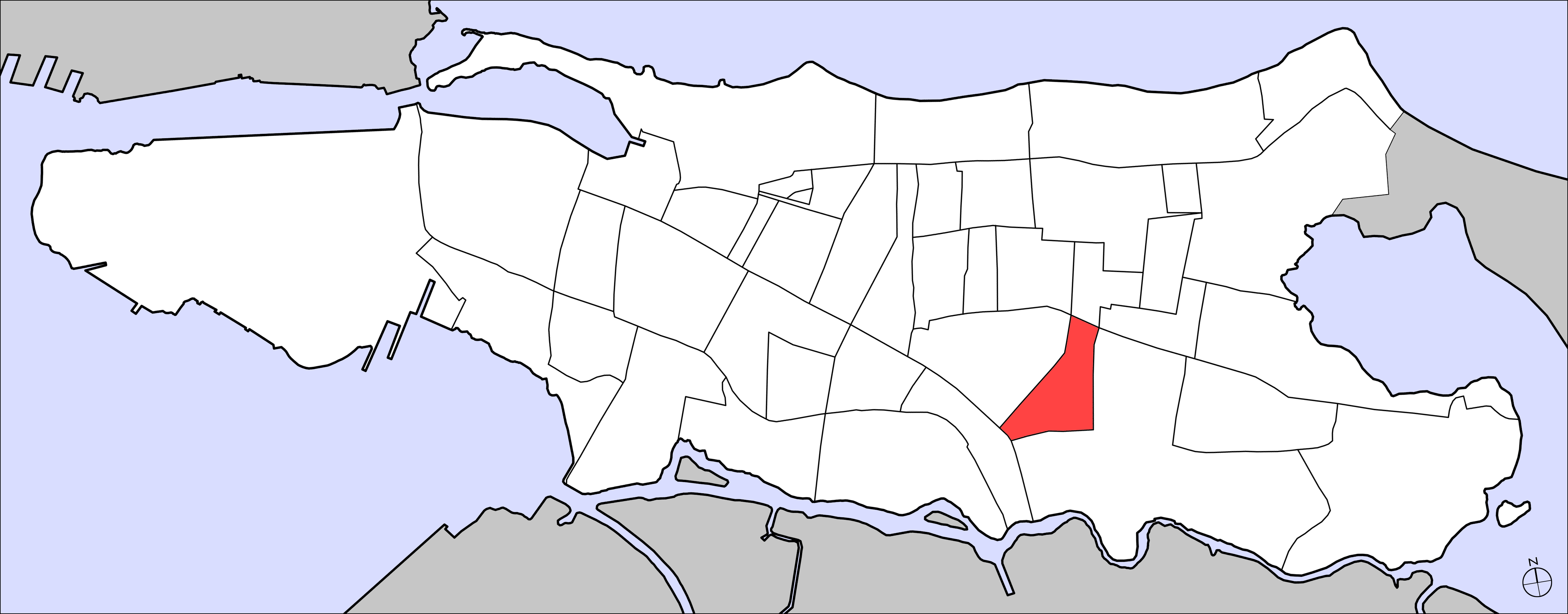
- Location of Monteflores within the Barrio of Santurce
- Commonwealth: Puerto Rico
- Municipality: San Juan
- Barrio: Santurce

Population
  - Total: 3,303 (combined)
- Source: 2000 United States census

Sagrado Corazón and Monteflores are two contiguous neighborhoods with similar characteristics formerly known as the Alto de Ubarri and part of Santurce's 40 subbarrios. Sagrado Corazón measures 0.34 km^{2} (345,472 m^{2}), with a resident population of 1,646 while Monteflores measures 0.17 km^{2} (172,397 m^{2}), with a resident population of 1,657, both as of the 2000 United States census.

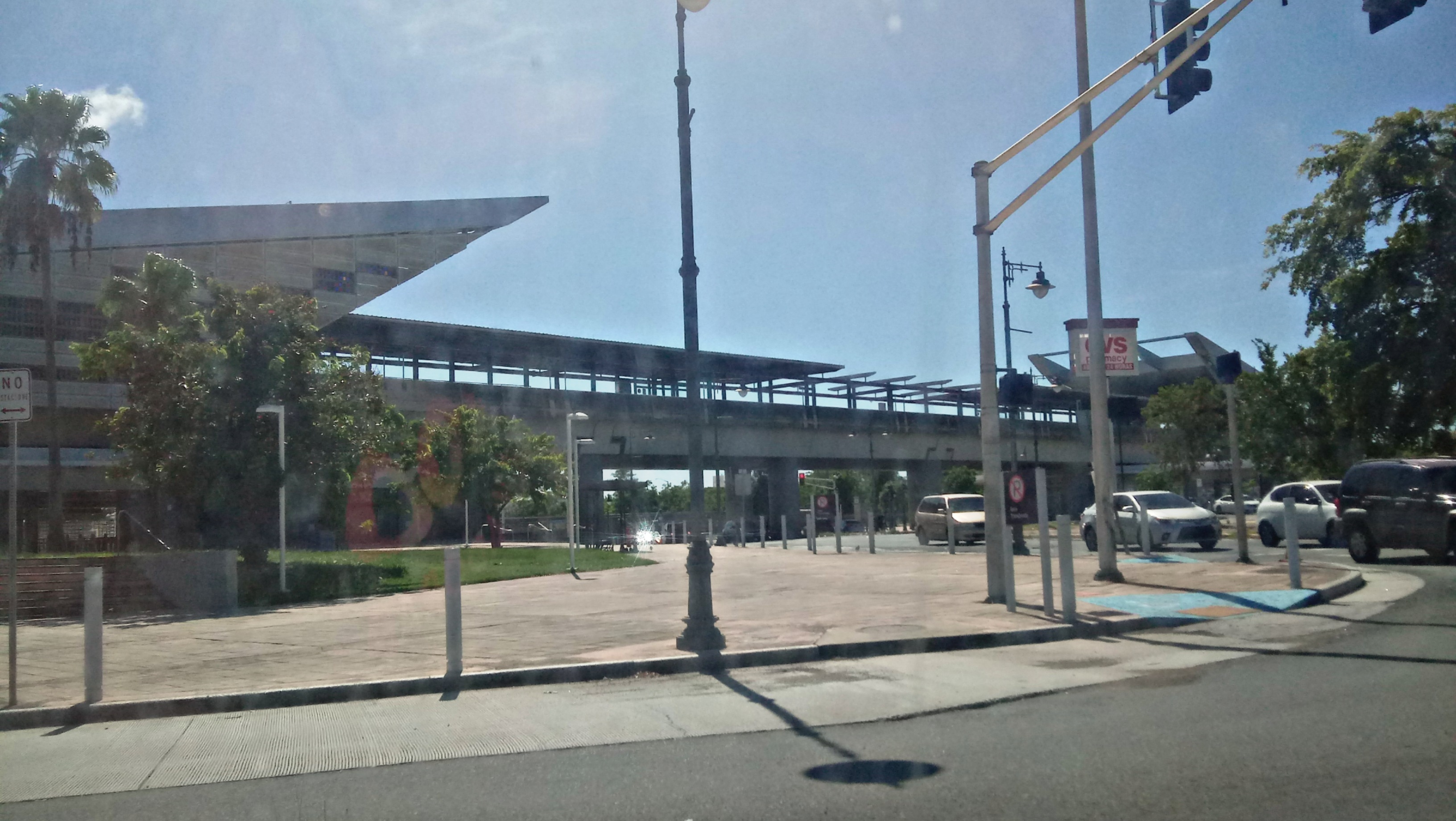
Sagrado Corazón train station

== History ==
This area was urbanized in the first decades of the 20th century with residences that belonged to the privileged families of the time and is varied in architectural styles. The architect Antonín Nechodoma located his residence in Monteflores and some residences designed by him are still in the area.

In 1940, Monteflores and Sagrado Corazón had a population of 1,229 and 1,638, respectively.

== Description ==
Sagrado Corazón and Monteflores are situated on the highest of Santurces' 5 hills, Monteflores, which reaches a height of 23 meters (75 feet), its borders are Borinquen Avenue to the south, Ponce of León Avenue and San Jorge Street to the west, Tapia Street to the east and to the north San Mateo Street and Eduardo Conde Avenue (Old Seboruco Road) bordering the Villa Palmeras subbarrio.

French-style neoclassic architectural characteristics of the University of the Sacred Heart (Universidad del Sagrado Corazón) where the residence of Pablo Ubarri, Count of Santurce, was located also abound along with Puerto Rican adaptations of Victorian architecture, there are also homes in the "tropical" U.S. influenced Mission Revival, French-gothic, Spanish Colonial Revival, Prairie School, and several apartment structures of the "Art Deco" periods in Bouret street. The Sagrado Corazón neighborhood was added to the Puerto Rico Register of Historic Sites and Zones in 2016 for its architectural value.

Nowadays, modern high rise apartment buildings dot the area. Sagrado Corazón station is the starting point of the "Tren Urbano" (Urban Train). Various bus lines (guaguas) operate in the area as well.

== Gallery ==
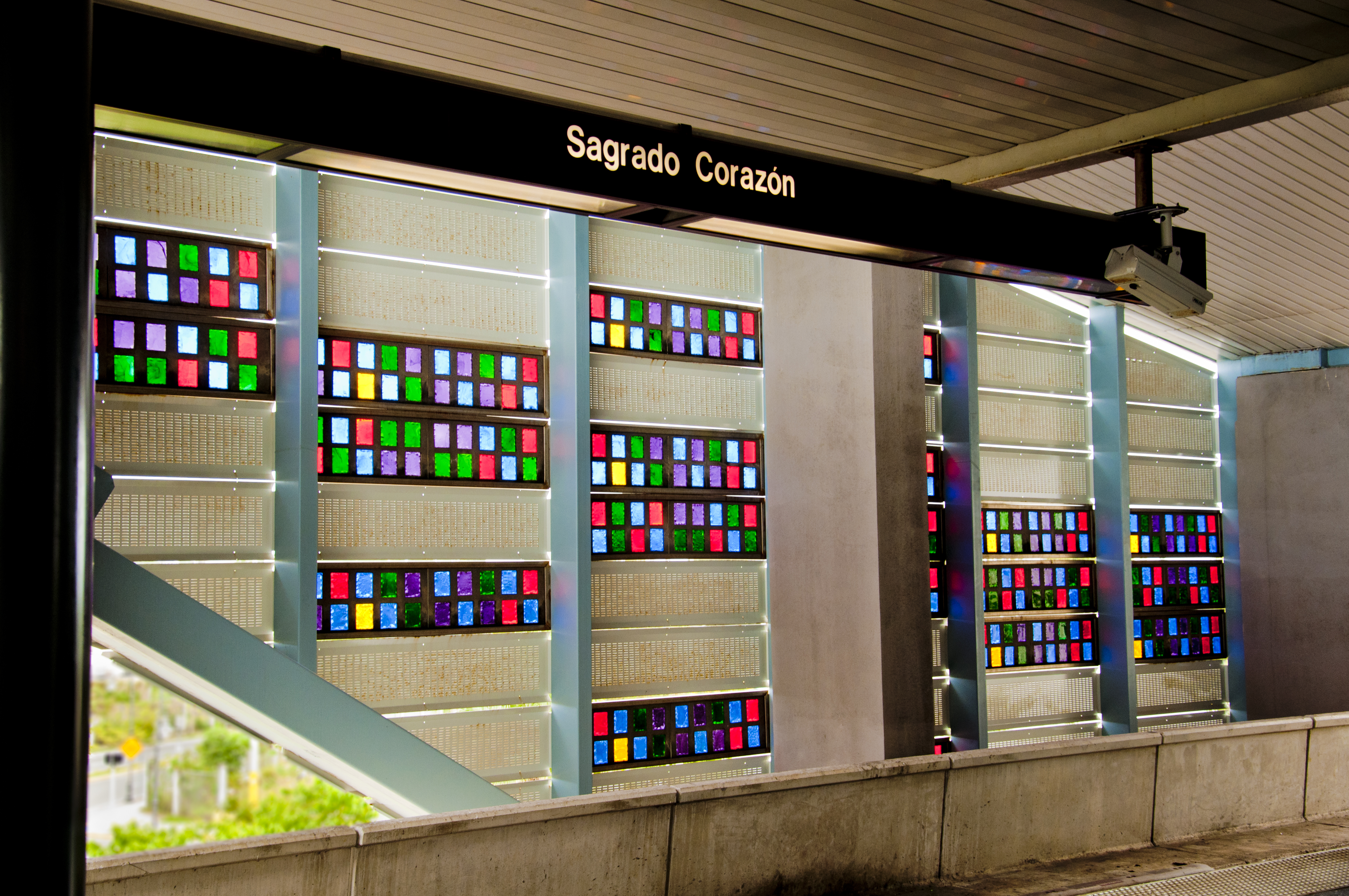
Tren Urbano station in Sagrado Corazon

== See also ==
- List of communities in Puerto Rico

== Bibliography ==
- Puerto Rican Houses in Sociohistorical Perspective Author; Carol F. Jopling - (1988)The University of Tennessee, Knoxville. ISBN 0-87049-543-7 / ISBN 0-87049-763-4
