= The Outlet 66 Mall =

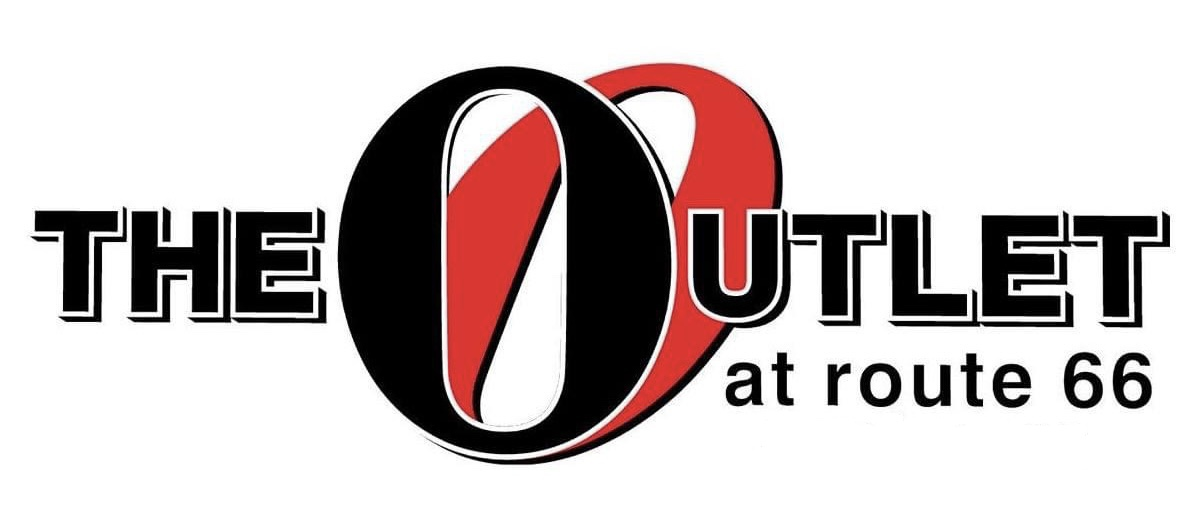
- Location: Canovanas, Puerto Rico
- Coordinates: 18°22′26″N 65°53′7″W
- Address: 18400 Autop. Roberto Sánchez Vilella, Canóvanas, Canóvanas 00729
- Opened: 16 August 2001
- Developer: Belz Enterprises
- Owner: Justin Tirri
- Architect: Soltero Muñoz Architects and Jerde Partnership
- Num. of stores: 80+
- Num. of anchor tenants: 1
- Floor area: 512,000 sq ft (47,600 m^{2})
- Floors: 1
- Website: https://www.theoutletmall66.com/

The Outlet 66 Mall, originally known as the Belz Factory Outlet World and subsequently as The Outlet at Route 66, is an enclosed shopping mall in Canóvanas, Puerto Rico. The main anchor store for the mall is a Burlington Coat Factory, accompanied by a Caribbean Cinemas location.

== History ==
=== Development ===
In June 1998, Memphis-based Belz Enterprises reported that it had broken ground for Puerto Rico's first enclosed factory outlet mall at a site in Canóvanas, 15 miles east of San Juan along Highway PR-3. The project was to be conceptualized by local firm Soltero Munoz Architects, with Jerde Partnership in California as design architects. Combining outlet shopping with restaurants and entertainment components, the mall would consist of five connected buildings with different streetscapes depicting Old San Juan. Phase I of the outlet would have approximately 350,000 sq. ft. of space with more than 80 tenants.

In spring 2000, Belz reported that more than 65 percent of the planned space had been pre-leased. In addition to factory outlet stores, Belz Factory Outlet World in Canóvanas would feature a multiplex movie theater. The planned opening date was in the spring of 2001.

=== Opening and first years of operations: 2000s ===
On August 9, 2001, it was reported that a soft opening was scheduled for August 16, with 25 to 30 stores initially opening for business. By October of that year, 85% of Belz’ 70 stores were expected to be ready. Andrew Groveman, president of Belz's Factory Outlet Division in Tennessee described the new mall as bringing "convenience" and "comfort", and being "easy to reach" and "widely visible". Designed to emulate the vibrantly colored houses of Old San Juan, the mall also featured an exterior designed to resemble the fort of El Morro.

Belz announced that the available space would be occupied by a range of well-known brands. Stores would offer products directly from the factory to make their merchandise more affordable. On August 11, 2001, Belz reported excellent sales at the Canóvanas mall, and announced the opening of more stores and new spaces in the food court. On March 13, 2003, the Caribbean Cinemas' new seven-screen movie theater opened.

On October 13, 2005, Belz reported the sale of the mall to locally owned Caribbean Airport Facilities (CAF) for an undisclosed amount. The deal, in which CAF was to acquire the remaining 51% of the property it didn't own already, was expected to close on December 1. Among CAF's plans for the outlet center was the development of out-parcels next to the mall, and an investment of almost $70 million to build a Holiday Inn hotel and a recreational park. Having started out with only 70 stores, the mall now had more than 100, and a total of 470,000 square feet of space. “We used to own the land where Belz is," development manager Justin Tirri explained, adding that as of the first day of December, the land plus the mall would become 100% CAF's property. Tirri expected the future expansion to bring more traffic and sales to the property. General manager Guillermo Cray stated that the U.S. Postal Office was operating from a temporary space while it built a new 8,000 square foot area where it would employ up to 100 people. Also to be developed were freestanding locations for four different banks.

=== Expansion: 2010s ===
On September 23, 2010, national retailer Burlington Coat Factory (Burlington) was set to inaugurate its third store in Puerto Rico at The Outlet 66 Mall, as the center was now called, creating approximately 150 new jobs. The mall experienced the positive effects of the recent addition to PR-66, or the Roberto Sanchez Vilella Expressway, a 3.8-mile extension from Canóvanas to Río Grande, which was inaugurated in October 2012. The mall at this point hosted 73 stores and 53 corridor modules (kiosks), climbing to No. 268 on the Caribbean Business's list of Top 400 Locally Owned Companies, and was among the top 15 largest shopping centers in Puerto Rico.

In September 2017, Hurricane María dealt a severe blow to the mall. The owners responded with a $62 million renovation to turn the shopping center into a “retailtainment” destination. Outlet 66 Mall president Justin Tirri said the mall had suffered $66 million in damages from the hurricane’s wrath, crippling about 80 percent of the shopping center. Rather than closing permanently, however, it was decided that the mall would rebuild and reopen. Before the hurricane struck, the mall had 84 stores, including kiosks. Post-storm, approximately 14 tenants chose to leave, giving mall operators the opportunity to rethink the concept. Aside from removing the Old San Juan facades, the mall received new floors, new entrances, and a permanent exhibit of sculptures made out of car parts.

Implementing a plan a few years in the making, the company initiated negotiations with tenants and was able to make space for what would be 85,000 square feet of entertainment options. This included the new K1 Speed & CXC Simulator Experience, an indoor electric carting complex for children and adults which was a first in Puerto Rico and the Caribbean; an eight-lane bowling alley; an arcade; and a new restaurant with capacity for 380 customers. The entertainment component of the mall was under the management of Powerhouse Entertainment, which planned to create 160 direct and indirect jobs.

=== 2020s ===
In March 2022, Atlanta-based fast-food burger chain Krystal announced the opening in Puerto Rico of its first international franchise-owned restaurant, planned for November 22 of that year. The first location outside the US mainland would be at The Outlet 66 Mall, with plans to grow and increase the brand’s footprint in Puerto Rico. Caribbean Cattle LLC was selected as the franchise operator.
