= Goldsmith Maid =

American Standardbred racehorse

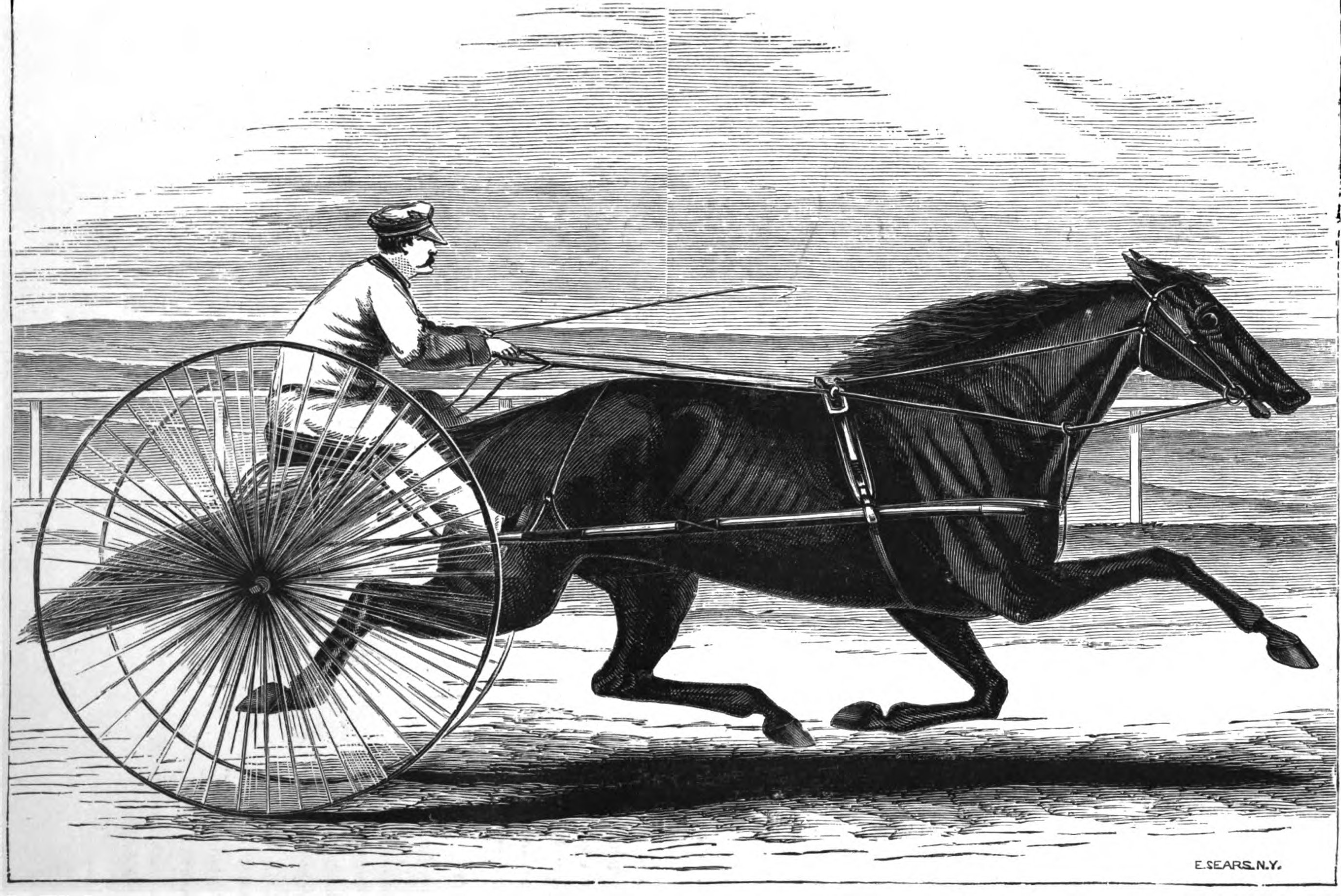
- 1877 drawing by J. McAuliffe
- Breed: Standardbred
- Discipline: Harness racing
- Sire: Alexander's Abdallah
- Grandsire: Hambletonian 10
- Dam: Old Ab
- Maternal grandsire: Abdallah
- Sex: Mare
- Foaled: 1857
- Country: United States
- Color: Bay
- Breeder: John B. Decker
- Owner: 1. John B. Decker (1857–1864); 2. John H. Decker; 3. William Tompkins; 4. Alden Goldsmith (1865–1868); 5. Budd Doble and Barney Jackson (1868–1874); 6. Henry N. Smith (1874–1885)

Record
- 123: 97-16-7

Earnings
- $364,200

Honors
- Harness Racing Hall of Fame inductee (1953); World Trotters Mile Record (7 times)

Goldsmith Maid (1857 – September 23, 1885) was a prominent Standardbred racemare in the 1870s that was called the "Queen of the Trotters" and had a harness racing career that spanned 13 years. Her last race was won at the age of 20 against a much younger horse named Rarus. She was inducted into the Harness Racing Hall of Fame in 1953.

== Bloodlines and early life ==
Goldsmith Maid was originally named Maid and was foaled in the spring of 1857 at the Deckertown, New Jersey farm of John B. Decker. Decker had purchased Maid's dam Old Ab (sired by Abdallah, the sire of Hambletonian 10) in 1853 from a hat peddler and, taken with the mare's even temperament, had bred her to Alexander's Abdallah (formerly known as Edsell's Hambeletonian) in the hopes of producing a fine farm colt. Alexander's Abdallah was also a grandson of Abdallah, which meant that Maid was very inbred in her male lineage. While Old Ab may have been gentle and even tempered, her first foal was a wild, fiery-tempered filly that jumped and crashed through Decker's fences and ran through the corn fields of his neighbors.

Maid was not able to be trained as a harness horse or for any other occupation that would be of use on a farm due to her refusal to be hitched to a cart or pull a plow. Yet Decker, taken with the horse's lively spirit, kept her on his farm for seven years. Though she was untamed, one of Decker's hired hands secretly rode Maid in several local horse races, and she became known as a fast, albeit ill-tempered, runner. In November 1864, Mrs. Decker, tired of the horse's infamous reputation as "Decker's worthless mare", persuaded her reluctant husband to sell Maid to his nephew John H. Decker for $260. Decker in turn sold Maid to William Tompkins, a harness racer, a few days later for $400 while en route to his home in Newburgh, New York. Tompkins was also unable to race Maid successfully, with the horse refusing to adopt an even gait that would not endanger both sulky and driver. He sold the horse in the early months of 1865 to Alden Goldsmith for $650 and a second-hand buggy. Goldsmith changed the horse's name to Goldsmith Maid and put her under the training of William Bodine.

== Racing record ==
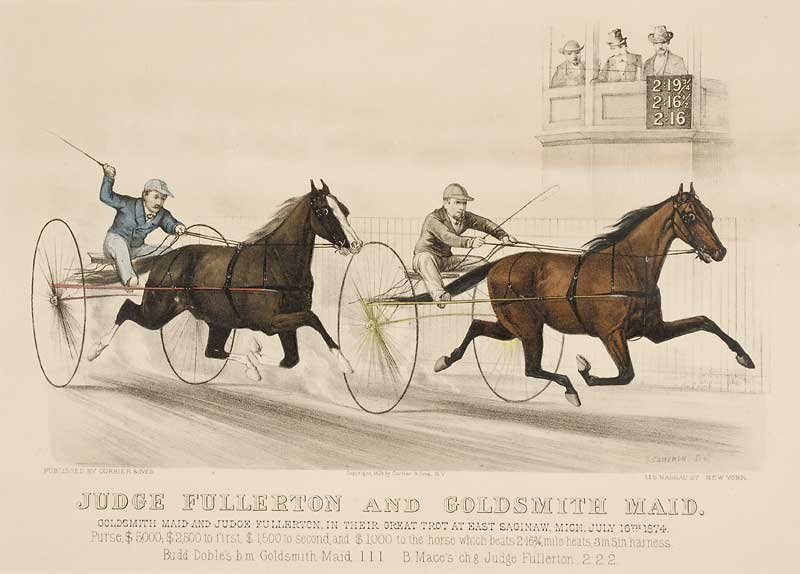
Goldsmith Maid beating Judge Fullerton on July 16, 1874 in East Saginaw, Michigan where she ran one mile in 2 minutes 16 seconds.

In the spring of 1865, Goldsmith Maid was 8 years old, was unbroken, and had a persistent upper respiratory infection that lasted throughout her maiden season. Bodine and Goldsmith decided not to use check reins, a martingale, blinders, or a whip with her, instead treating her with kindness and allowing her to set her own pace. She trotted her first race in August 1865 and won several local races. She set track records at Goshen, (with a best time of running a mile in 2 minutes, 26 seconds in three heats) in 1865 and Mystic Park racetrack in Boston, in 1868 at a time of 2:21½.

Goldsmith, believing that the 11-year-old mare was nearing the end of her career, sold her to Budd Doble, a popular harness racer and trainer, in 1868 for $20,000. Goldsmith Maid raced for another six years for Doble, notably winning races in Buffalo, Sacramento, and East Saginaw, Michigan, against male contenders half her age. From 1869 to 1874, Goldsmith Maid became immensely popular with the American public, attracting thousands of spectators to special match races that pitted her against the nation's top harness racers. Doble earned so much from these matches and the horse had become so popular that "The Maid" traveled to these engagements in her own private railroad car. In 1871 Goldsmith Maid first broke the trotters mile record by recording a mile of 2.17 in a match against Lucy in Milwaukee. She lowered the record again in 1872. In 1874, Doble set a harness racing world record (one mile in 2:14) in Boston with Goldsmith Maid, who was by then 17 years old after having lowered the record twice at Saginaw and at Buffalo and Rochester earlier in the year.

The mare was sold to Henry N. Smith, who owned Fashion Farm in Trenton, New Jersey, for $35,000 in 1874. The last four years of her career were spent defending her title, which she continued to match on several occasions. In 1875 she came close to her world record again trotting 2.14 1/2 at Charter Oak Park in Hartford. Her last race was in Toledo, Ohio, on September 27, 1877 against Rarus, who tried to break her record of trotting a mile in 2 minutes and 14 seconds. Rarus failed on that attempt but later succeeded in breaking the record. Goldsmith Maid won over 350 heats and won 92 out of 121 races. She earned a total of $364,200 in her career, a record that was not broken until the 1950s.

== Retirement and death ==
Goldsmith Maid was retired at age 20 after a 13-year-racing career to Smith's farm in Trenton. She produced three colts, but none of them inherited her speed on the track. In her retirement, she became a local celebrity and major tourist attraction for Trenton, attracting many visitors to Smith's farm in the summer. She died suddenly on September 23, 1885, at the age of 28 after developing pneumonia. When her body was examined after death, she was found to have an enlarged heart. Her death was widely covered by the press, and The New York Times reported that there was a period of national mourning after her death.

== See also ==
- List of historical horses
