= Fasig-Tipton =

American auction house for Thoroughbred and Standardbred horses

Fasig-Tipton logo

The Fasig-Tipton Company, Inc. is an American auction house for Thoroughbred horses. Founded in 1898, it is the oldest auction company of its kind in North America. The company has offices in Lexington, Kentucky, Elkton, Maryland, and Saratoga Springs, New York. In 2008, Fasig-Tipton Co. was purchased by Synergy Investments Ltd., a Dubai-based company headed by Abdulla Al Habbai. Of the 13 Triple Crown winners, two of the three which were offered at public auction were sold at Fasig-Tipton: 2015 winner American Pharoah, sold at the 2013 Fasig-Tipton Saratoga Sale and 1975 Seattle Slew, sold at the 1973 Fasig-Tipton July Sale in Kentucky.

== History ==
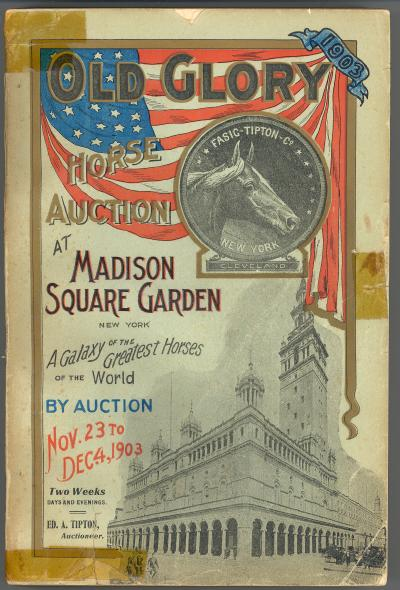
1903 "Old Glory" Sale Catalog

The Fasig-Tipton Company, Inc. is an auction house for Thoroughbred horses founded in 1898 by William B. Fasig and Edward A. Tipton. It is the oldest auction company of its kind in North America. Its first headquarters were in Madison Square Garden in New York, and Fasig-Tipton initially sold high-class road and carriage horses in addition to Thoroughbred and Standardbred racing stock.

Fasig-Tipton's main horse auction in the early 20th century was referred to as "Old Glory." Held annually in late November or early December, the Old Glory sale offered a "Grand Aggregation of Thoroughbred Stallions, Mares, Racehorses, Yearlings, and Weanlings," as well as Standardbreds. Shortly after the Old Glory sale of 1907, New York suffered a severe economic downturn, and bank closures threatened the sustainability of the horse sales business. Fasig turned the company over to his assistant, Enoch James Tranter, who brokered a deal with the banks which allowed the young company to survive the financial instability. Tranter's also made dramatic changes to the format of the sales catalogue: originally, the page for each horse offered might list up to 30 generations of pedigree with limited or no produce record, as well as subjective descriptions written by the individual consignors. Tranter changed this so emphasis was placed on the performance and production history of the horse's closest relatives, limiting the page to three to four dams with detailed information about the horse's dam's performance. Tranter also insisted on health certificates for all horses entered into his sales and pregnancy certificates for broodmares offered in foal. Fasig-Tipton was the first horse sales company to do this.

=== Saratoga ===
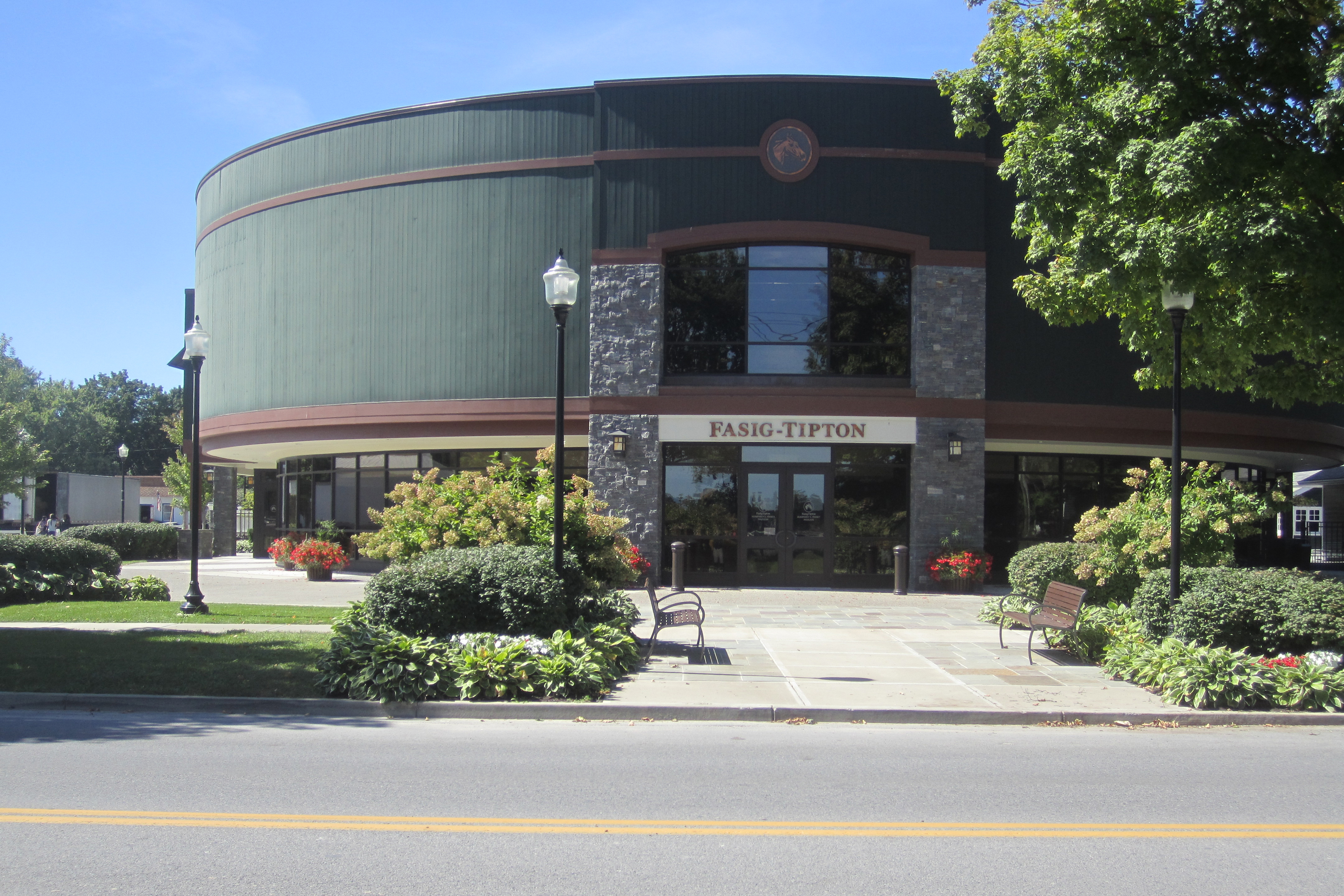
Humphrey S. Finney Pavilion

After World War I, Fasig-Tipton established a satellite office in Saratoga Springs, New York. The new pavilion was host to the Saratoga Selected Yearling Sale, which was held during the Saratoga race meet beginning in 1917. Due to cargo limitations imposed on breeders during World War II, the Saratoga Sale was suspended from 1943 through 1945. In 1959, Fasig-Tipton was honored as the Saratoga Firm of the Year.

In 1968, the Humphrey S. Finney Sales Pavilion was built, named after an individual who worked for the company from the 1930s through the 1960s. In 2010, the pavilion and sales grounds were renovated to improve amenities for buyers, sellers, and horses. It is located approximately a quarter of a mile from the Saratoga Race Course.

The Finney Pavilion, the center of the sales during the month of August, is a small auditorium with seating on the bottom in front of an oblong walking ring, where the horses are shown and the auctioneer and spokesperson sit during the sales. The balcony area contains more seating and a press box, around which is an art exhibition put on by the Cross Gate Gallery, which is not affiliated with Fasig-Tipton. The grounds also hold a restaurant, a snack bar, eight large barns, an office and tool room, and a large walking ring attached to the pavilion for warming up and viewing the horses. Two alleys that front parts of the property are named Fasig Lane and Tipton Lane.

Sales held annually in Saratoga include the Saratoga Sale (selected yearlings), the New York Bred Sale (preferred yearlings), and the Saratoga Fall Sale (horses of all ages). The Fasig-Tipton auctions in Saratoga are typically held in early August. Historically the Fasig-Tipton Saratoga Sale kicks off the summer yearling sales in North America, preceded only by their own Kentucky July yearling sale. There are two nights of Select Sales where only the top yearlings in the country are selected to be sold. During these sessions one can only sit inside the pavilion if a reservation is made in advance. The public is allowed on the grounds and inside the pavilion to view the horses and artwork inside, but cannot sit unless prior arrangements are made. The New York Bred Preferred Yearling Sale is offered annually the weekend after the Saratoga Sale. During the Preferred sessions only selected New York bred horses are shown, and the public is invited to sit where they wish. The sales grounds and seating are open to the public throughout the sale but seating is limited during the Selected sessions.

=== Kentucky ===
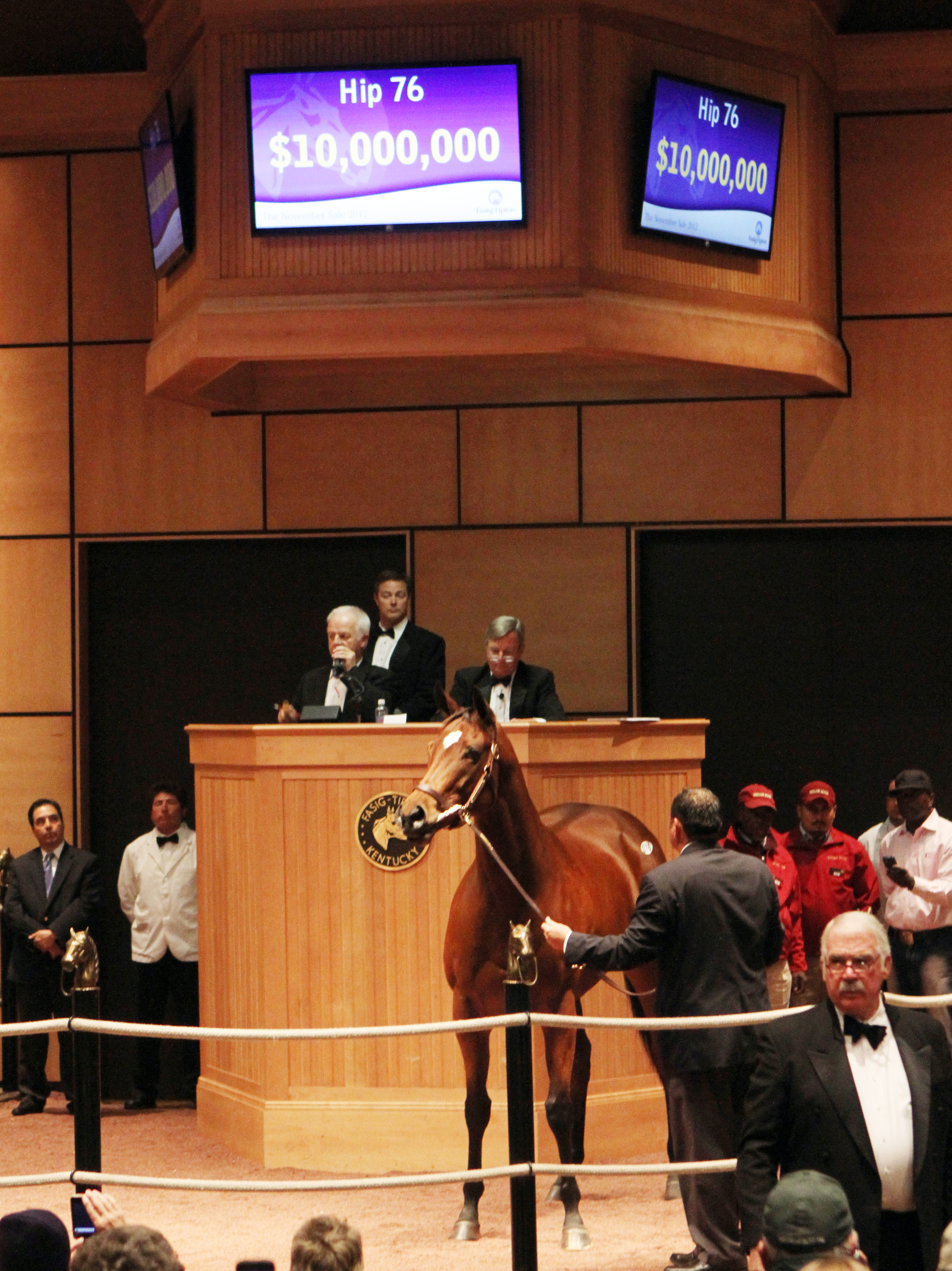
Havre de Grace selling for $10 million at the 2012 Fasig-Tipton November Sale

In 1972, Fasig-Tipton established its now-permanent headquarters in Lexington, Kentucky. The Kentucky office operates year-round, offering five sales. Sales held annually in Kentucky include the Kentucky Winter Mixed Sale (horses of all ages), the July Sale (selected yearlings), the Summer Selected Horses of Racing Age Sale, the October Sale (Kentucky fall yearlings), and the November Sale (selected weanlings, two-year-olds, racing prospects, and broodmares).

Each November, the November Sale annually produces the highest average price of any breeding stock sale worldwide. The November Sale currently holds three world records for horses offered at public auction: top-priced broodmare, Broodmare of the Year Better Than Honour, who sold for $14,000,000 in 2008; top-priced broodmare prospect, champion Havre de Grace, who sold for $10,000,000 in 2012; and top-priced juvenile filly, Breeders' Cup Juvenile Fillies (G1) winner Stardom Bound, who sold for $5,700,000 in 2008.

=== Expansion ===
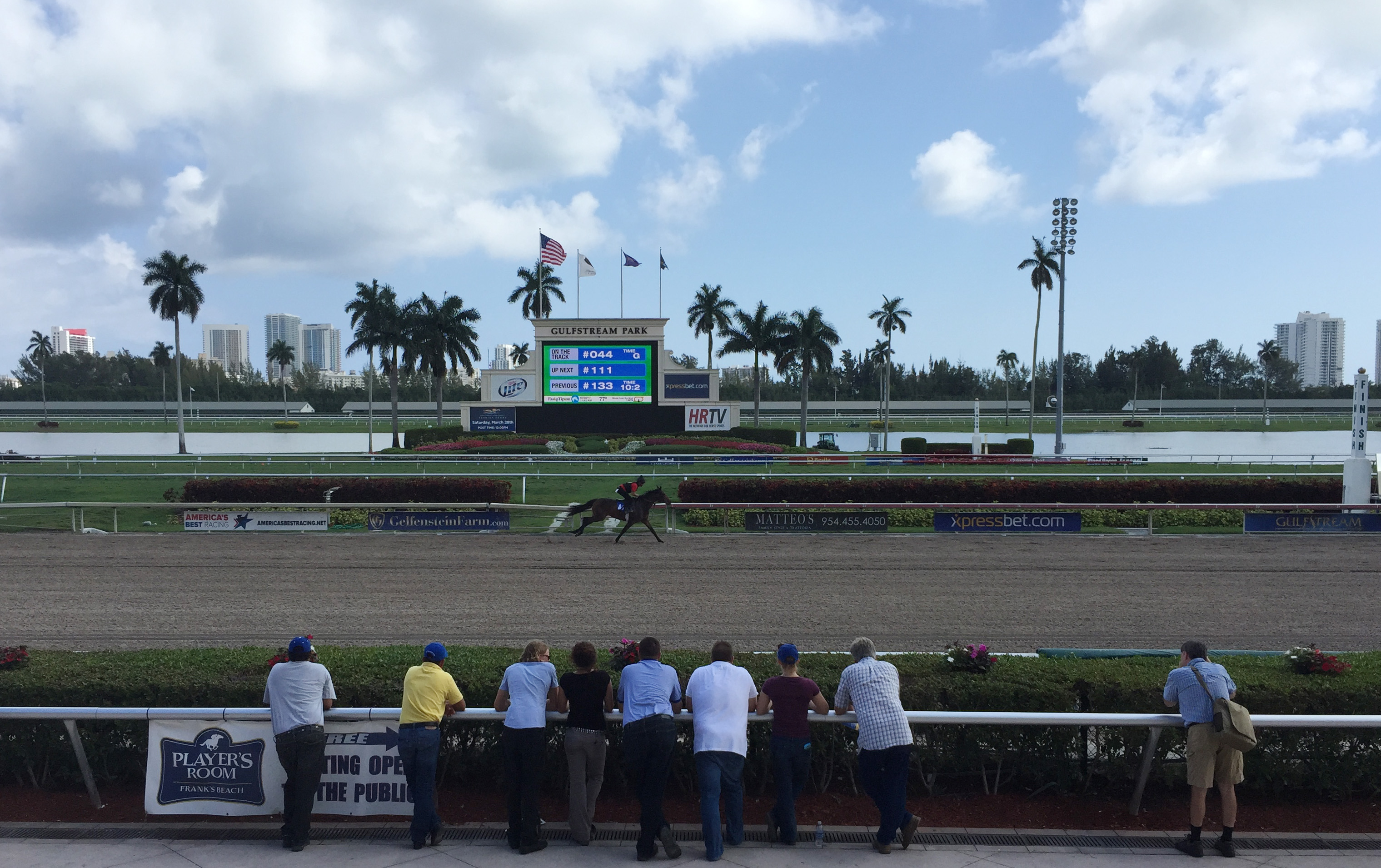
The Florida Sale, Under Tack Show

Fasig-Tipton began holding sales in Florida in the 1950s. At first, the Florida Two-Year-Olds in Training Sale alternated between Calder Racecourse and Hialeah Park. In 2015, the selected sale moved permanently to Gulfstream Park. The Florida Sale produced the most expensive Thoroughbred ever to sell at public auction, a colt which sold for $16,000,000 in 2006, later named The Green Monkey.

In 1986, Fasig-Tipton established a Midlantic division, based in Timonium, Maryland. The Midlantic Two-Year-Olds in Training Sale holds the record for most expensive Thoroughbred sold at public auction in Maryland, colt which sold for $3,550,000 in 2022.

=== 2008 acquisition ===
In 2008, Fasig-Tipton was purchased by Synergy Investments Ltd., a Dubai-based company headed by Abdulla Al Habbai. The acquisition added international representatives in Australasia, Europe, South America, and the Middle East. In addition, Fasig-Tipton modernized its sales facilities in Lexington, Saratoga, and Timonium, as well as made considerable technological upgrades.

Fasig-Tipton Digital

In March 2022, Fasig-Tipton launched its online auction platform, Fasig-Tipton Digital.

== See also ==
- Keeneland
- Thoroughbred Owners and Breeders Association
