= Lou Dillon =

American Standardbred racehorse

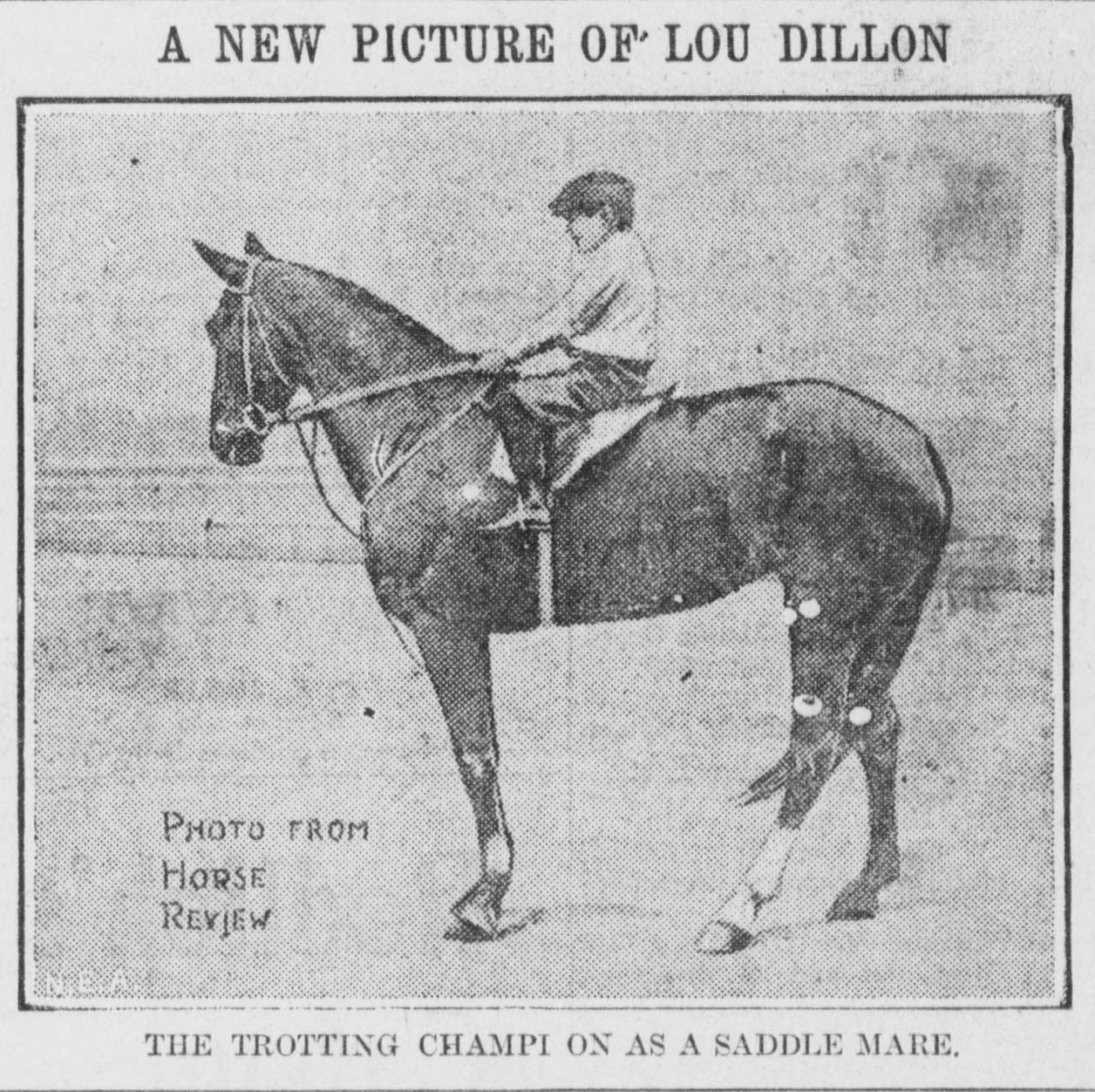

Lou Dillon (1898, near Santa Ynez, California—January 15, 1925, near Santa Barbara, California) was a Standardbred trotting horse. She was the first trotter to trot a mile in under 2:00, which she completed at Memphis in 1903.

Her owner was Henry Pierce, who never raced her professionally. She was trained initially by Charles Tanner, who drove her in many amateur events. Later her workouts under Millard Sanders (1856-1928) were fast, and she attracted a lot of attention.

Henry Pierce refused to sell her, even for the $20,000 offered him in 1903. Ten days after this offer was made, Pierce suddenly died in San Francisco. All his stock was sold at a dispersal sale in Cleveland. C.K.G. Billings bought Lou Dillon, and she again went into training with Millard Sanders. Billings, too, refused to race her professionally. She did run at track races in nearby trials.

In 1903, she became the first trotter to register 2:00 for the mile. On October 24, 1903, she bettered her mark, running 1:58½ at Memphis. Four days later in Memphis, she raced and won. With her new-found fame, she began an exhibition tour of the United States and Europe, driven by Billings and Sanders. Her stops included Berlin, Moscow and Vienna.

In 1904, she was involved in a doping scandal at the Memphis Gold Cup (innocently — a rival doped her to prevent her from winning). She was retired in 1906 and died at the age of 26 in 1925. She was buried in Santa Barbara, near where Lou Dillon Lane is found today. She was elected to the Harness Racing Hall of Fame in 1955. Her original gravestone is now on display at the Santa Barbara fairgrounds.
