= Montgomery Park Race Track =

Horse racing venue in Memphis, Tennessee

- Race day at Montgomery Park Race Track c.1900
- Interactive map of Montgomery Park Race Track
- Location: Memphis, Tennessee, United States
- Coordinates: 35.119°N 89.983°W
- Owned by: New Memphis Jockey Club
- Date opened: 1851
- Course type: Flat racing 1 mile dirt oval
- Notable races: Tennessee Derby; Tennessee Oaks; Montgomery Handicap

Montgomery Park Race Track was an American thoroughbred racetrack in Memphis, Tennessee.

== History ==
The track was originally constructed in 1851 on plantation land southeast of Memphis. In 1882, Colonel Henry A. Montgomery organized the New Memphis Jockey Club, which purchased the race track and the surrounding land. The facility was named Montgomery Park at this time.

The track ran its last race meet in 1906 due to the outlawing of gambling by the Tennessee legislature. Following the closure, the track land and facilities were first leased and then purchased by the city of Memphis and incorporated into the Mid-South Fairgrounds.

== Physical attributes ==
The track consisted of a one mile dirt oval 65 feet wide at all points.

== Track records ==
Track records for Montgomery Park at various distances.

Distance	Horse	Age	Weight	Date	Time
^{1}/2 mile	Rose; Dele Strome	3; 2	100; 101	04/09/1887; 05/07/1906	:49
4^{1}/2 furlongs	Sainrida; Montgomery	2; 2	115; 113	05/05/1906; 05/09/1906	:55 ^{1}/4
^{5}/8 mile	Horace E.	2	118	05/07/1906	1:01 ^{1}/4
5^{1}/2 furlongs	Toah; Nannie Hodge	4; 4	107 ^{1}/2; 106	04/16/1902; 04/17/1905	1:08 ^{1}/4
^{3}/4 mile	Waring	5	129	04/23/1902	1:14
^{7}/8 mile	Triaditza; The Rush	3; 3	86; 102	04/14/1900; 04/28/1900	1:27 ^{3}/4
7^{1}/2 furlongs	Elsie L.	4	105	04/18/1903	1:34 ^{1}/2
1 mile	Rapid Water	4	113	03/28/1905	1:40 ^{1}/2
1 m. & 70 yds.	Silurian	4	97	04/18/1902	1:45 ^{3}/4
1^{1}/16 miles	Ram's Horn	3	106	03/27/1905	1:47 ^{1}/2
1^{1}/8 miles	The Lady; James Reddick	5; 3	108; 105	04/21/1902; 05/09/1906	1:54 ^{1}/4
1^{3}/16 miles	Jack Young	6	101	05/03/1905	2:02 ^{1}/2
1^{1}/4 miles	Joe Lesser	6	102	06/30/1905	2:08 ^{3}/4
1^{3}/8 miles	Royal Choice	4	101	04/30/1897	2:27
1^{1}/2 miles	Jackanapes	4	105	04/27/1899	2:38 ^{1}/2
Steeplechases
Short Course (abt. 1^{1}/4 mi.)	Handsqueeze	4	125	04/22/1902	2:48
Long Course (abt. 2 mi.)	MacLaren	5	135	04/19/1902	4:37
