= Racing secretary =

A racing secretary is an occupation in American horseracing. The secretary is typically licensed by the government and is responsible for the custody and safekeeping of horse papers and ownership documents, forming races, compiling a list of entries, keeping a complete record of all races, publishing and printing an accurate race program, writing the condition book, providing records for the media, and communicating with the racing commission and/or other government oversight agencies. The secretary may also serve as the handicapper.
