= Universidad, San Juan, Puerto Rico =

Barrio of Puerto Rico

Universidad
- Barrio
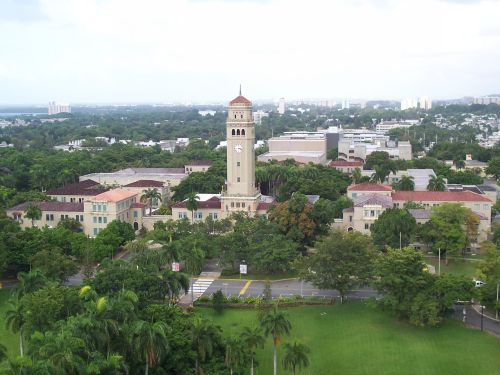
- University of Puerto Rico, Río Piedras Campus

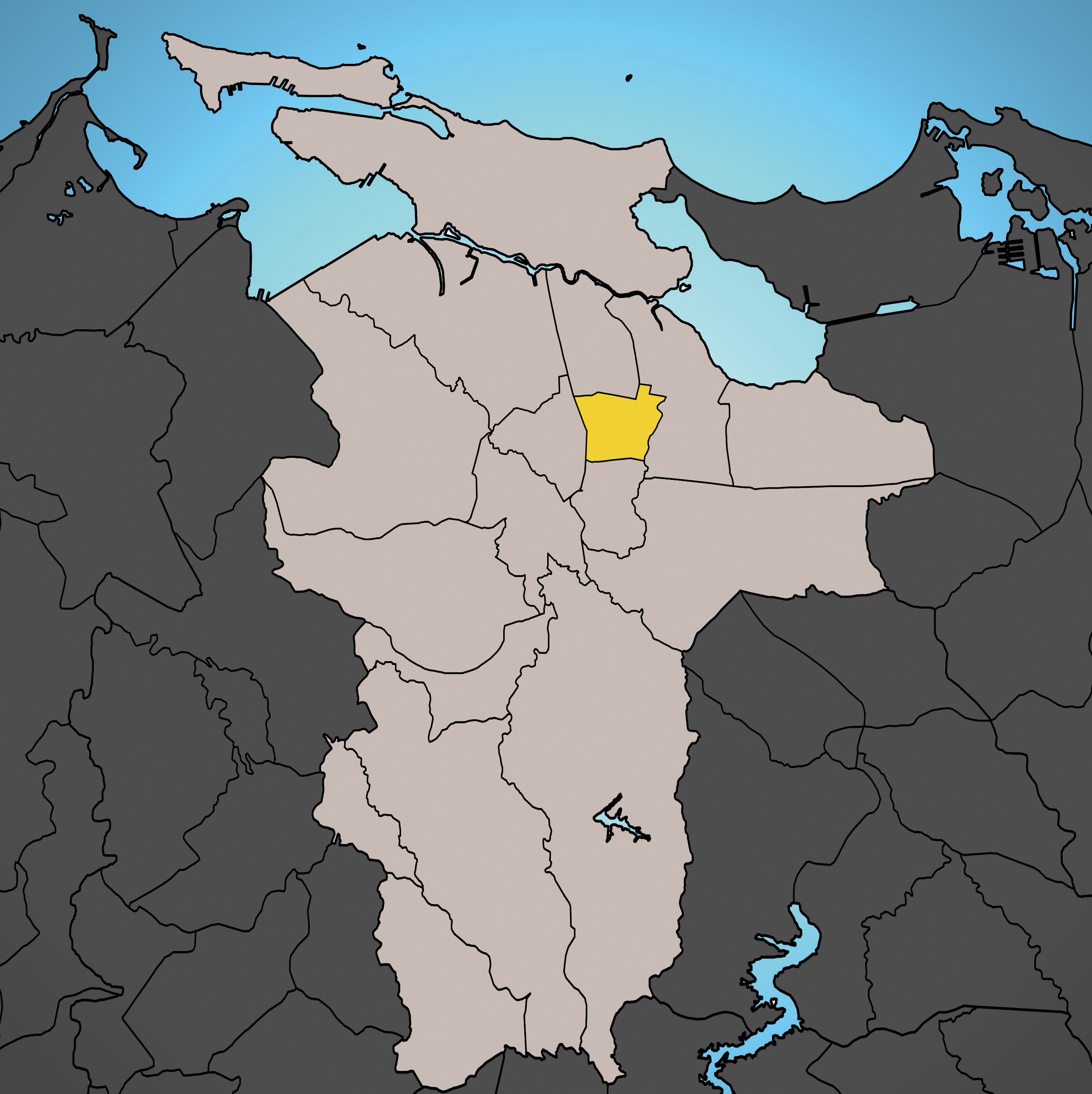
- Location of Pueblo shown in yellow
- Coordinates: 18°24′27″N 66°02′47″W
- Commonwealth: Puerto Rico
- Municipality: San Juan

Area
  - Total: 0.63 sq mi (1.6 km^{2})
  - Land: 0.63 sq mi (1.6 km^{2})
  - Water: 0 sq mi (0 km^{2})
- Elevation: 66 ft (20 m)

Population (2010)
  - Total: 2,515
  - Density: 4,056.5/sq mi (1,566.2/km^{2})
- 2010 census
- Time zone: UTC−4 (AST)

Universidad, located in Rio Piedras, is one of the 18 barrios of the municipality of San Juan, Puerto Rico.

It originally belonged to the municipality of Río Piedras. When Río Piedras was annexed to San Juan in 1951, Río Piedras's barrio Universidad became one of San Juan's barrios. Universidad is notable for being the location of the main campus of the University of Puerto Rico at Río Piedras. The underground section of the Tren Urbano with the Universidad station is located below Ponce de León Avenue, to the west of the neighborhood.

== Demographics ==
In 2010, Universidad had a population of 2,515.

Historical population
Census	Pop.	Note	%±
1950	3,740		—
1960	4,295		14.8%
1970	2,708		−36.9%
1980	2,622		−3.2%
1990	2,558		−2.4%
2000	2,501		−2.2%
2010	2,515		0.6%
U.S. Decennial Census; 1900 (N/A) 1910-1930; 1930-1950 1980-2000 2010

== Subbarrios ==
Universidad is divided into the following four subbarrios:

- Amparo
- Auxilio Mutuo
- Institución
- Valencia

== Notable event ==
On October 14, 2019, the Ernesto Ramos Antonini public housing residence (located near the university) was the scene of a mass shooting, with more than 1000 shots fired with six people dead. Puerto Rico has struggled with escalating criminality, mainly due to the illegal drug trade.

== See also ==
- List of communities in Puerto Rico
