= Amparo, Universidad =

Subbarrio in San Juan, Puerto Rico

Coordinates: 18.4068388°N 66.0508270°W

Amparo
- Subbarrio
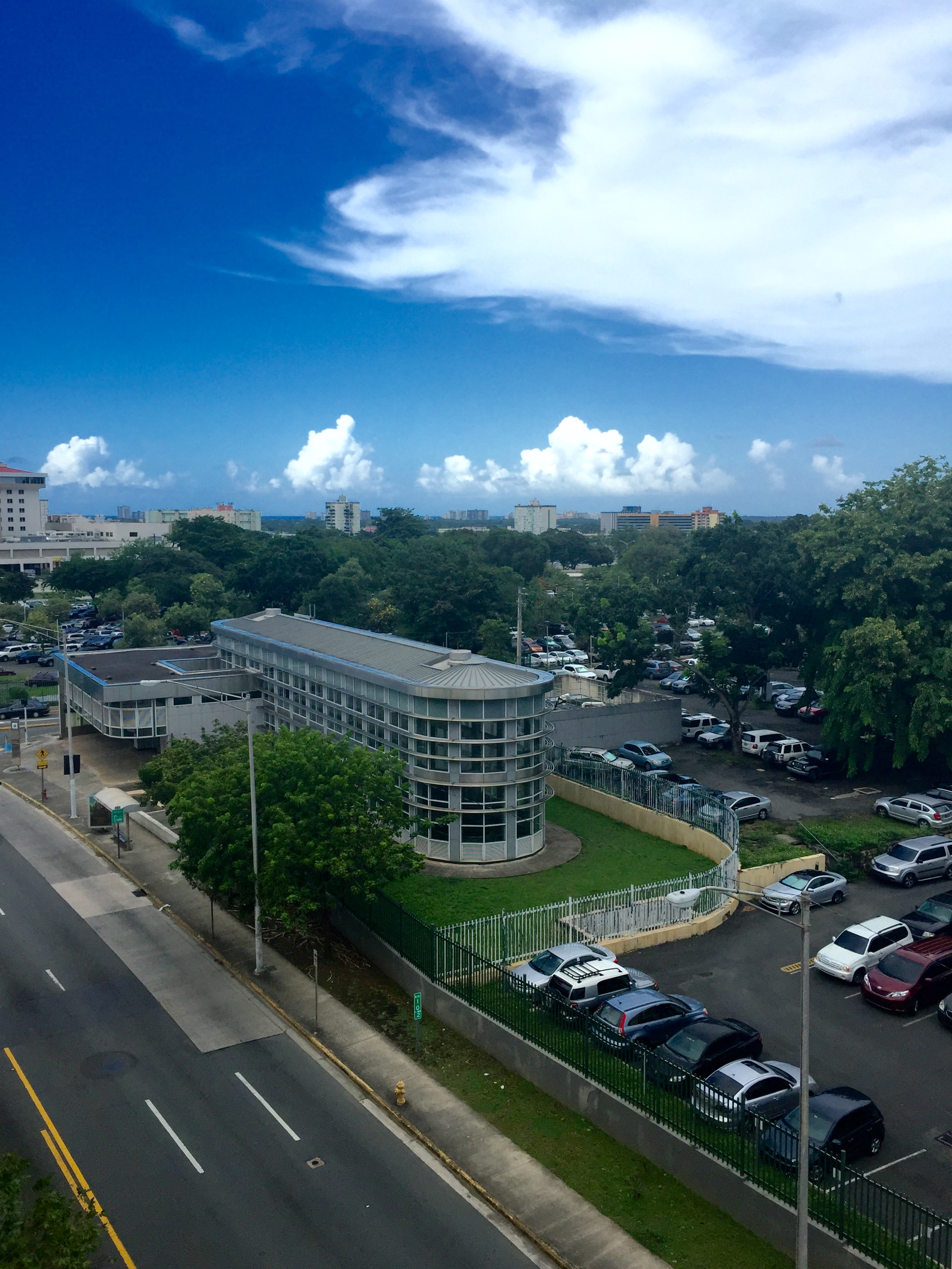
- Universidad station in Amparo
- Interactive map of Amparo
- Commonwealth: Puerto Rico
- Municipality: San Juan
- Barrio: Universidad

Population
  - Total: 0
- Source: 2000 United States census

Amparo is one of four subbarrios in barrio Universidad in the municipality of San Juan, Puerto Rico.
