= Deportivo station =

Rail station of the Tren Urbano system in San Juan, Puerto Rico

Deportivo
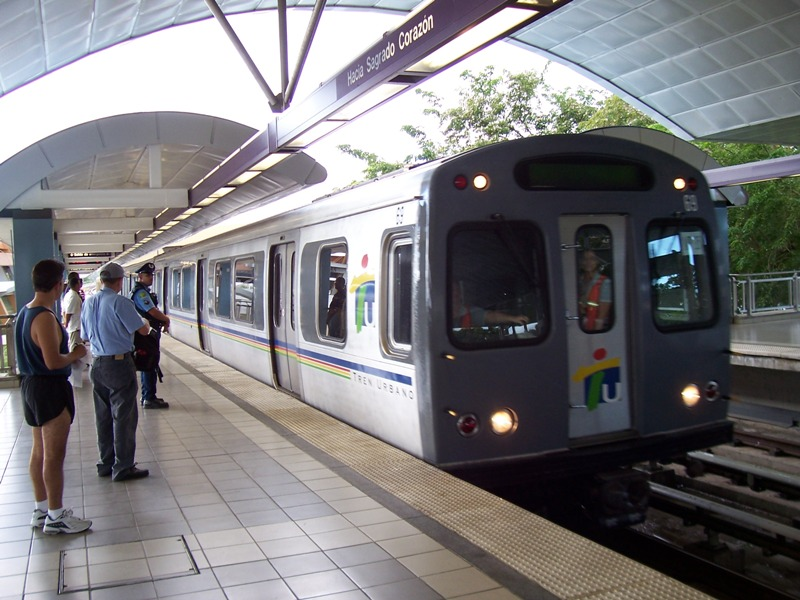

General information
- Coordinates: 18°23′40″N 66°08′57″W
- Owner: Puerto Rico Department of Transportation and Public Works
- Operator: Alternate Concepts
- Platforms: 2 side platforms
- Tracks: 2

Construction
- Structure type: Elevated

History
- Opened: December 17, 2004; 21 years ago

Services
Preceding station	Tren Urbano	Following station
Bayamón Terminus	Tren Urbano	Jardines toward Sagrado Corazón
Location

Deportivo is a rapid transit station in San Juan agglomeration, Puerto Rico. It is located between Bayamón and Jardines on the sole line of the Tren Urbano system, in Bayamón, just outside of its downtown (Bayamón Pueblo). The trial service ran in 2004, however, the regular service only started on 6 June 2005.

The station is named after the Bayamón Sports Complex (Spanish: Complejo Deportivo de Bayamón) which is located nearby.

== Bus connections ==
The bus stops are located north of the station past the Bayamón Judicial Center along PR-2.

- T2: Bayamón TU station (through Juan Ponce de León Ave) – Sagrado Corazón TU station
- T3 (M3): Bayamón TU station (through Juan Ponce de León Ave) – Sagrado Corazón TU station

In addition to AMA services, the bus terminal also has connections to municipal buses and local carros públicos.

== Nearby ==
- Complejo Deportivo de Bayamón
  - Juan Ramón Loubriel Stadium
  - Ruben Rodríguez Coliseum
  - Miguel J. Frau Gymnasium
- Casa Alcaldía de Bayamón
- Bayamón Judicial Center
- Bayamón Municipal Cemetery
- Bayamón River Park Trail, Parque Riverside entrances
- Santa Rosa Mall
