= Río Piedras station =

Rail station of the Tren Urbano system in San Juan, Puerto Rico

Río Piedras
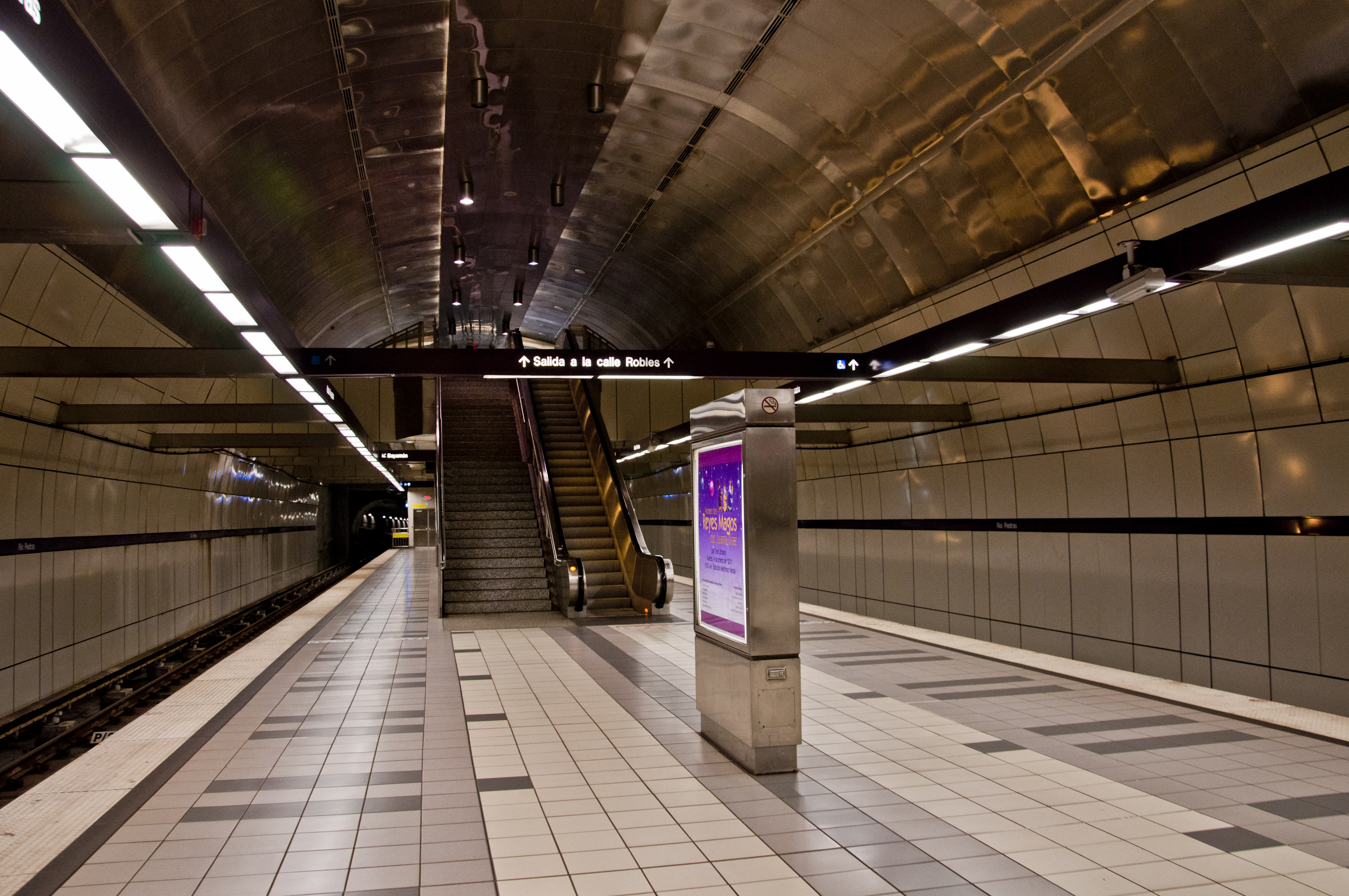
- View of the underground Río Piedras Station platform

General information
- Coordinates: 18°23′59″N 66°03′07″W
- Owner: Puerto Rico Department of Transportation and Public Works
- Operator: Alternate Concepts
- Platforms: 1 island platform
- Tracks: 2

Construction
- Structure type: Underground

History
- Opened: December 17, 2004; 21 years ago

Services
Preceding station	Tren Urbano	Following station
Cupey toward Bayamón	Tren Urbano	Universidad toward Sagrado Corazón
Location

Río Piedras is a rapid transit station in the San Juan Metropolitan Area, Puerto Rico. It is located between Cupey and Universidad stations on the only line of the Tren Urbano system, in the downtown area of Río Piedras (Río Piedras Pueblo), in the city of San Juan. The station is named after Río Piedras where it is located, itself named after the Piedras River which crosses the area. The trial service ran in 2004, however, the regular service only started on 6 June 2005.

This station is heavily influenced by underground stations on the LA Metro B line and D line.

== Nearby ==
- Río Piedras Pueblo (downtown Río Piedras)
- José de Diego pedestrian street
- Plaza del Mercado de Río Piedras (Río Piedras marketplace building)
- University of Puerto Rico, Río Piedras campus

== Gallery ==
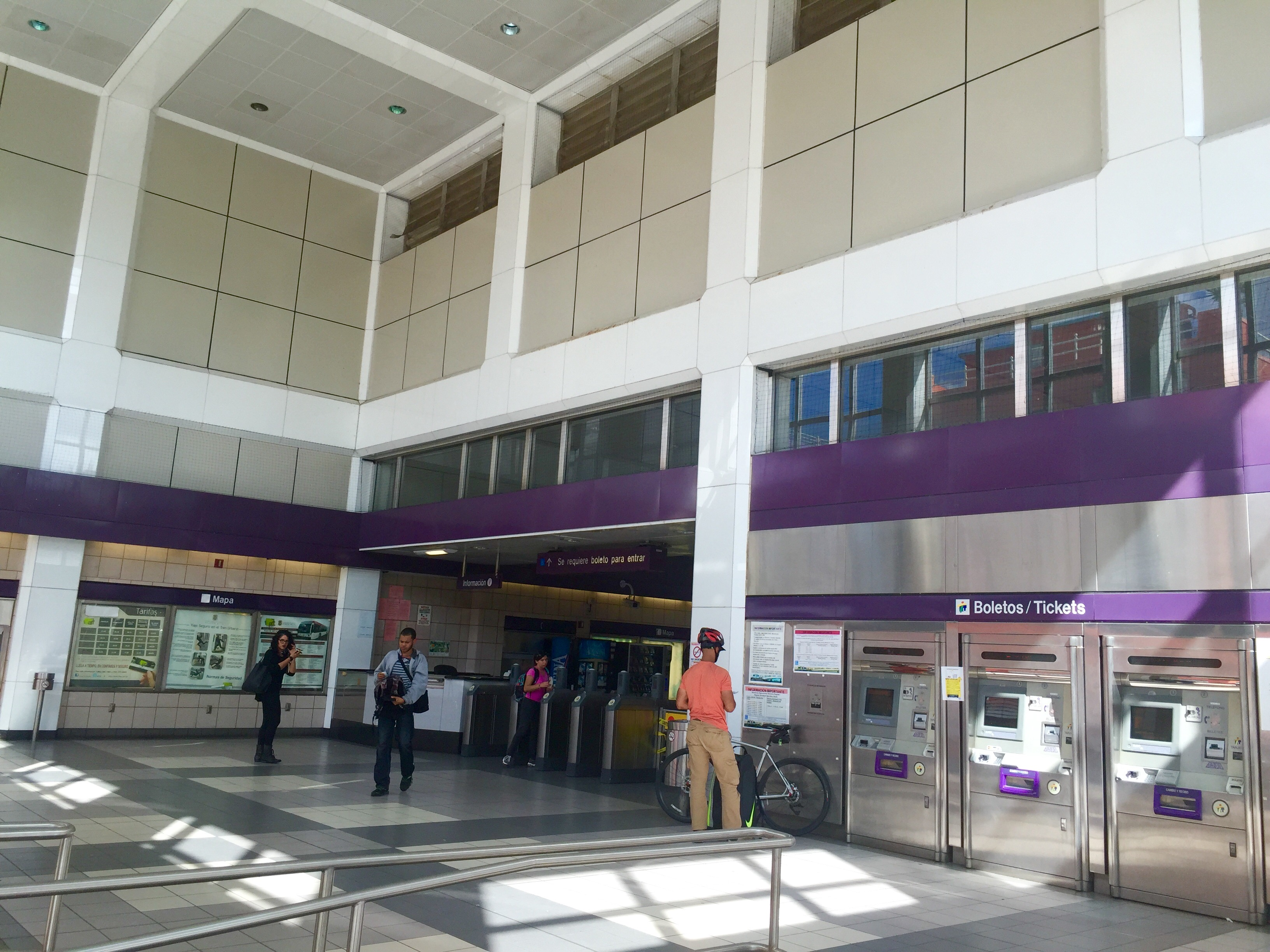
Northern entrance of the station

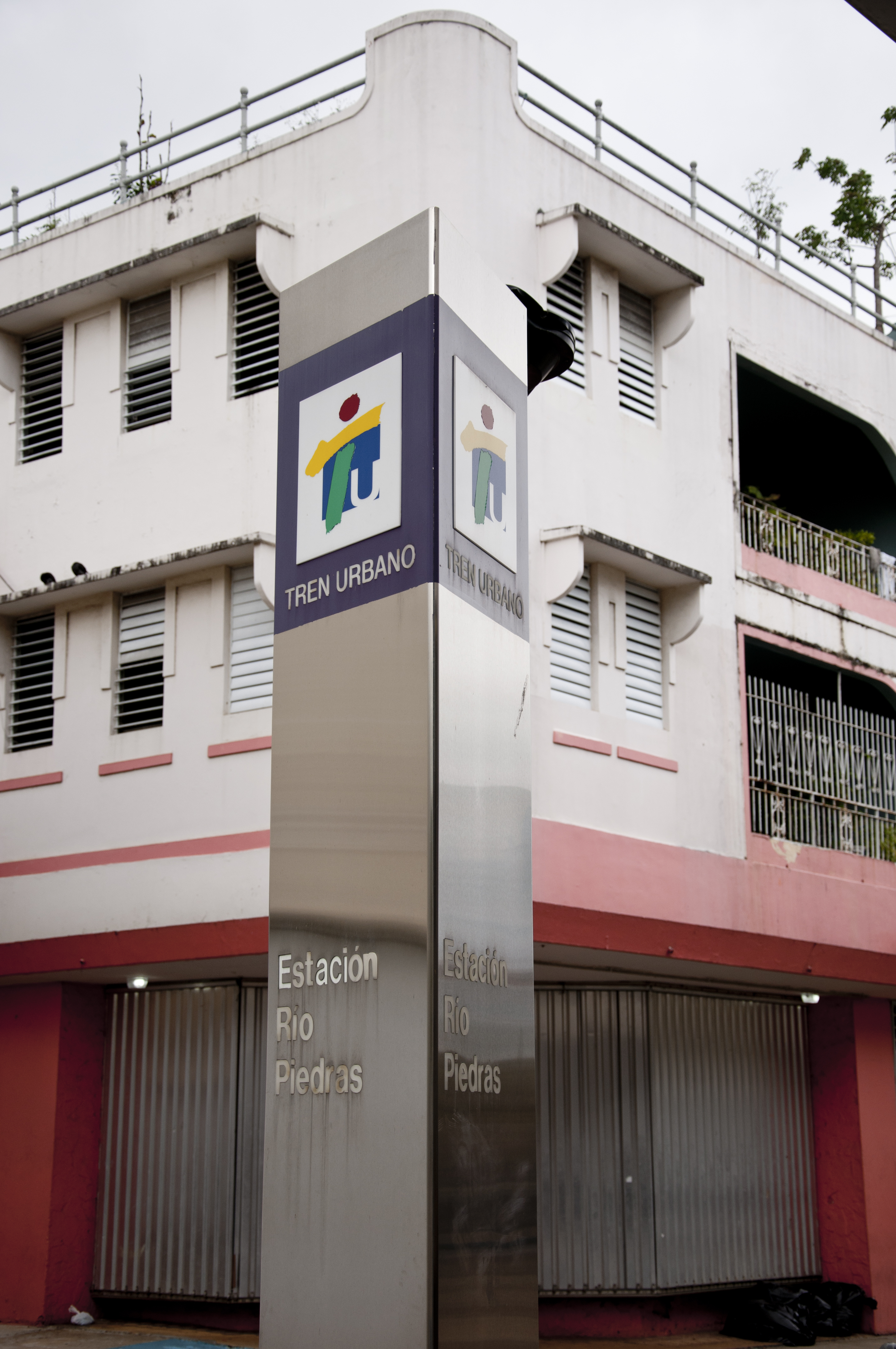
Río Piedras entrance to the station

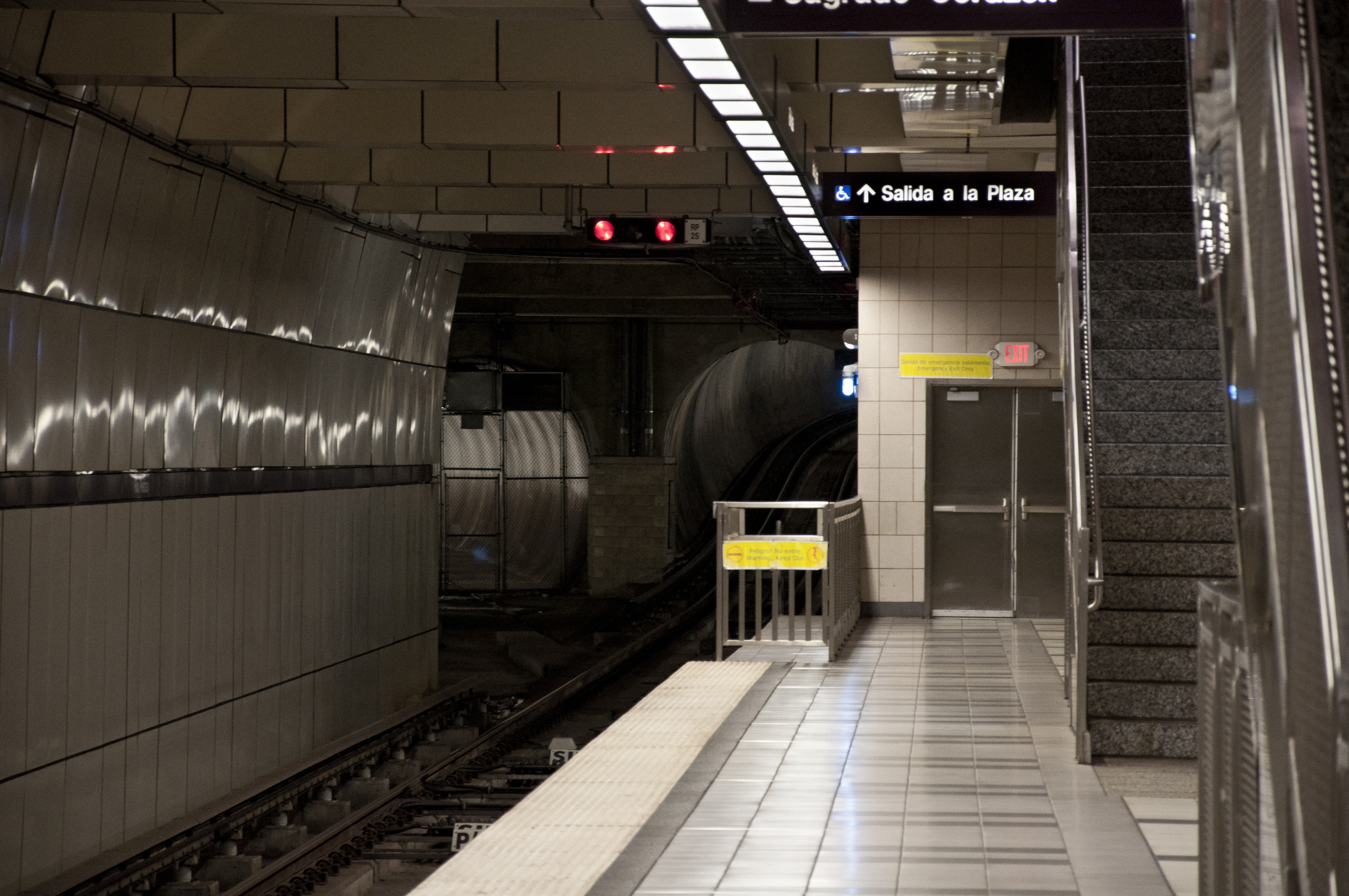
View from the platform. The unused eastward tunnel is intended for a possible future extension of the Tren Urbano system to Carolina.
