= Torrimar station =

Rail station of the Tren Urbano system in San Juan, Puerto Rico

Torrimar
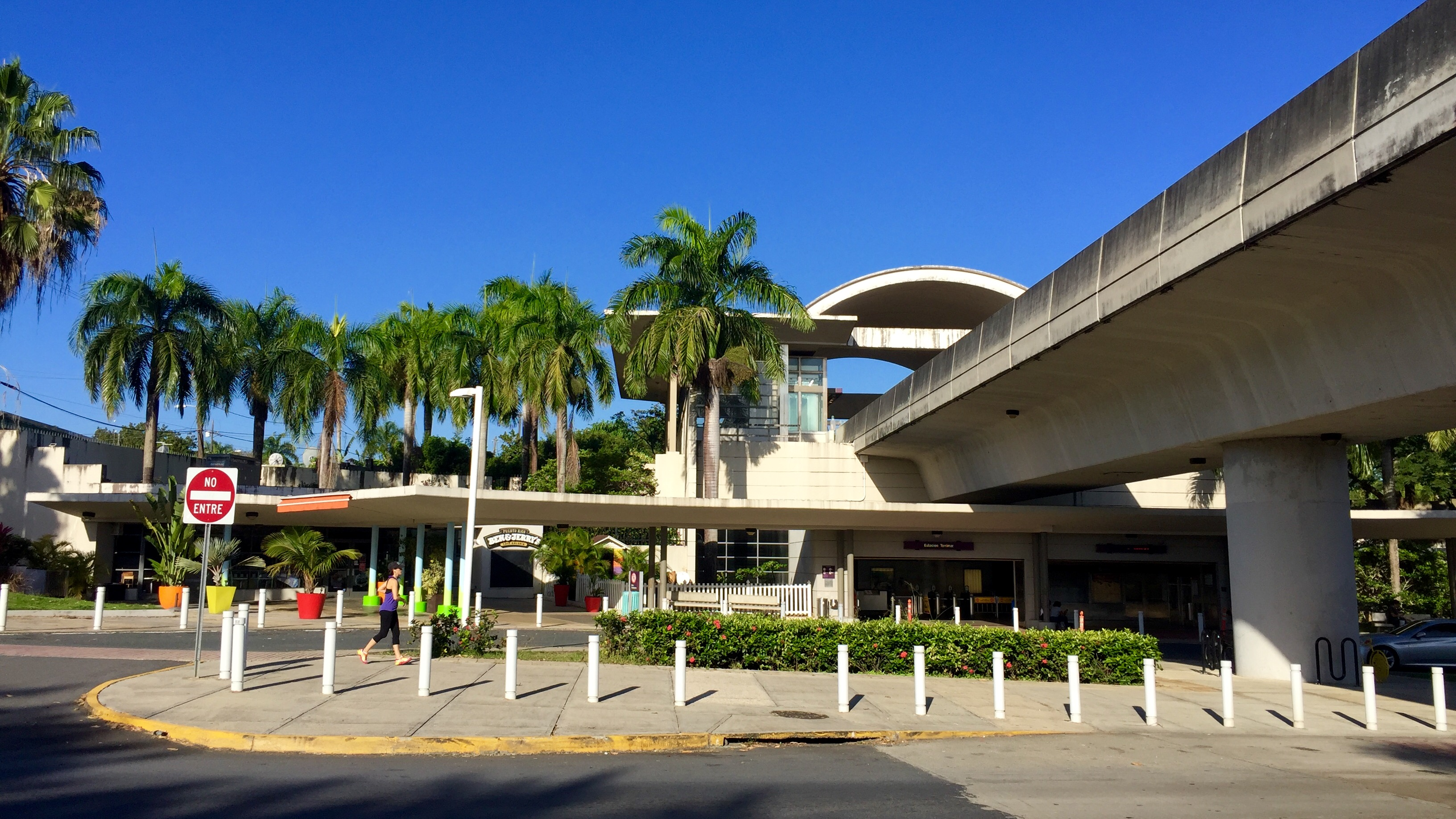
- Entrance to the station

General information
- Coordinates: 18°23′31″N 66°07′08″W
- Owner: Puerto Rico Department of Transportation and Public Works
- Operator: Alternate Concepts
- Platforms: 2 side platforms
- Tracks: 2

Construction
- Structure type: Elevated

History
- Opened: December 17, 2004; 21 years ago

Services
Preceding station	Tren Urbano	Following station
Jardines toward Bayamón	Tren Urbano	Martínez Nadal toward Sagrado Corazón
Location

Torrimar is a rapid transit station in San Juan agglomeration, Puerto Rico. It is located between Jardines and Martínez Nadal stations on the sole line of the Tren Urbano system, in Frailes barrio of Guaynabo. The station is named after the Torrimar neighborhood which it serves. The trial service ran in 2004, however, the regular service only started on 6 June 2005. The station is one of the few in the system that has retail space available and, since 2008, it has hosted a Ben & Jerry's store.

== Nearby ==
- Garden Hills neighborhood
- Suchville Memorial Funerary and Cemetery
- Suchville neighborhood
- Torrimar neighborhood
- Torrimar Sports Complex
