= Institución, Universidad =

Subbarrio in San Juan, Puerto Rico

Coordinates: 18.4054720°N 66.0453010°W

Institución
- Subbarrio
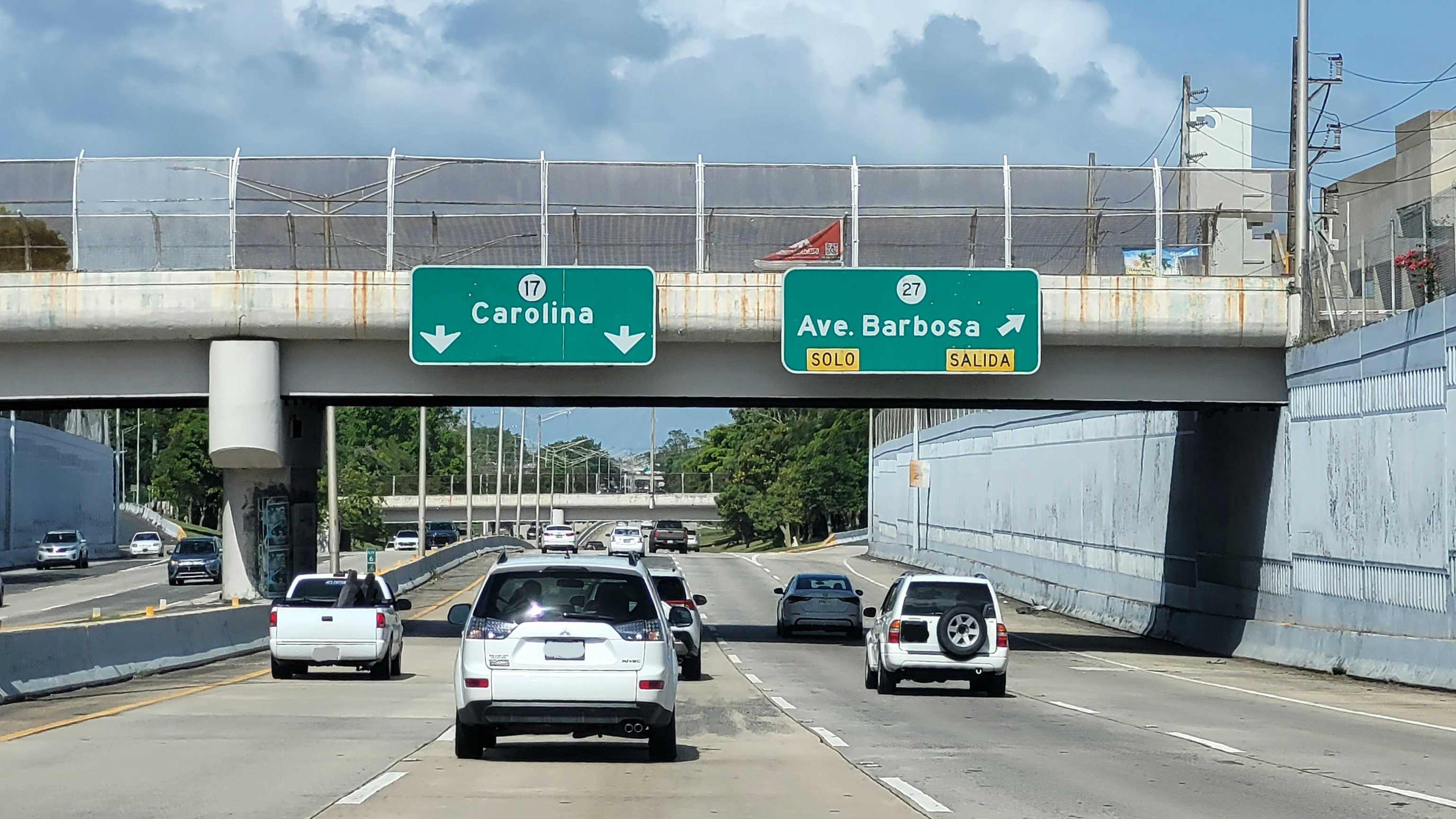
- Puerto Rico Highway 17 in Institución
- Interactive map of Institución
- Commonwealth: Puerto Rico
- Municipality: San Juan
- Barrio: Universidad

Government
  - Type: Mayor of San Juan

Population
  - Total: 144
- Source: 2000 United States census

Institución is one of the 5 subbarrios of Universidad, itself one of 18 barrios of San Juan, Puerto Rico.
