= Jardines station =

Rail station of the Tren Urbano system in San Juan, Puerto Rico

Jardines
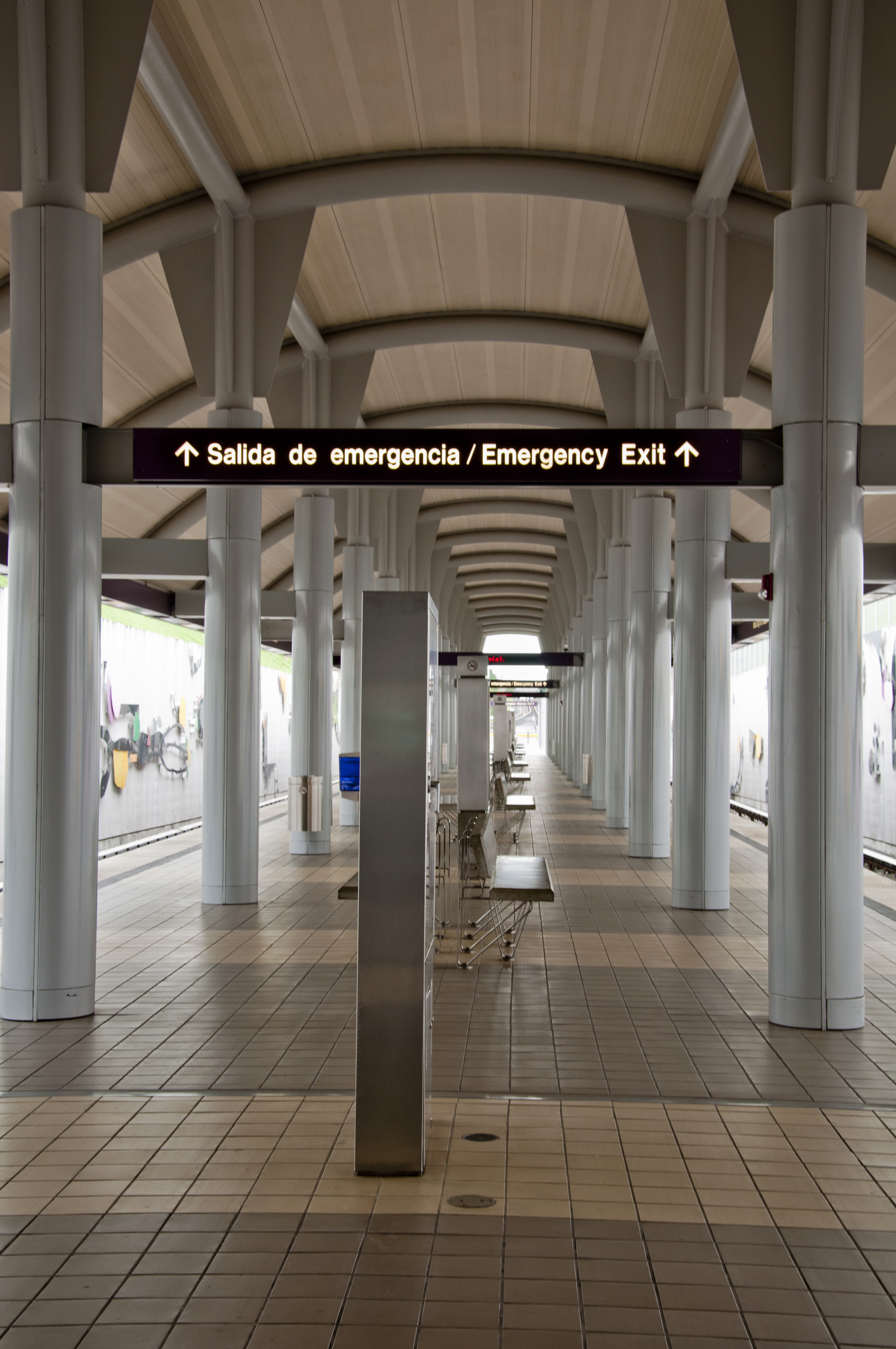
- The platform

General information
- Coordinates: 18°23′39″N 66°07′42″W
- Owner: Puerto Rico Department of Transportation and Public Works
- Operator: Alternate Concepts
- Platforms: 1 island platform
- Tracks: 2

Construction
- Structure type: Below grade

History
- Opened: December 17, 2004; 21 years ago

Services
Preceding station	Tren Urbano	Following station
Deportivo toward Bayamón	Tren Urbano	Torrimar toward Sagrado Corazón
Location

Jardines is a rapid transit station in the San Juan agglomeration, Puerto Rico. It is located between Deportivo and Torrimar stations on the sole line of the Tren Urbano system, in Bayamón. The station is located in Juan Sánchez barrio, close to the municipal border with Guaynabo, and it is named after the Jardines de Caparra neighborhood, located nearby. The trial service ran in 2004, however, the regular service only started on 6 June 2005.

== Nearby ==
- Jardines de Caparra neighborhood
- Valle del Sol neighborhood
- Riviera Tennis Center
