= Cupey station =

Rail station of the Tren Urbano system in San Juan, Puerto Rico

Cupey
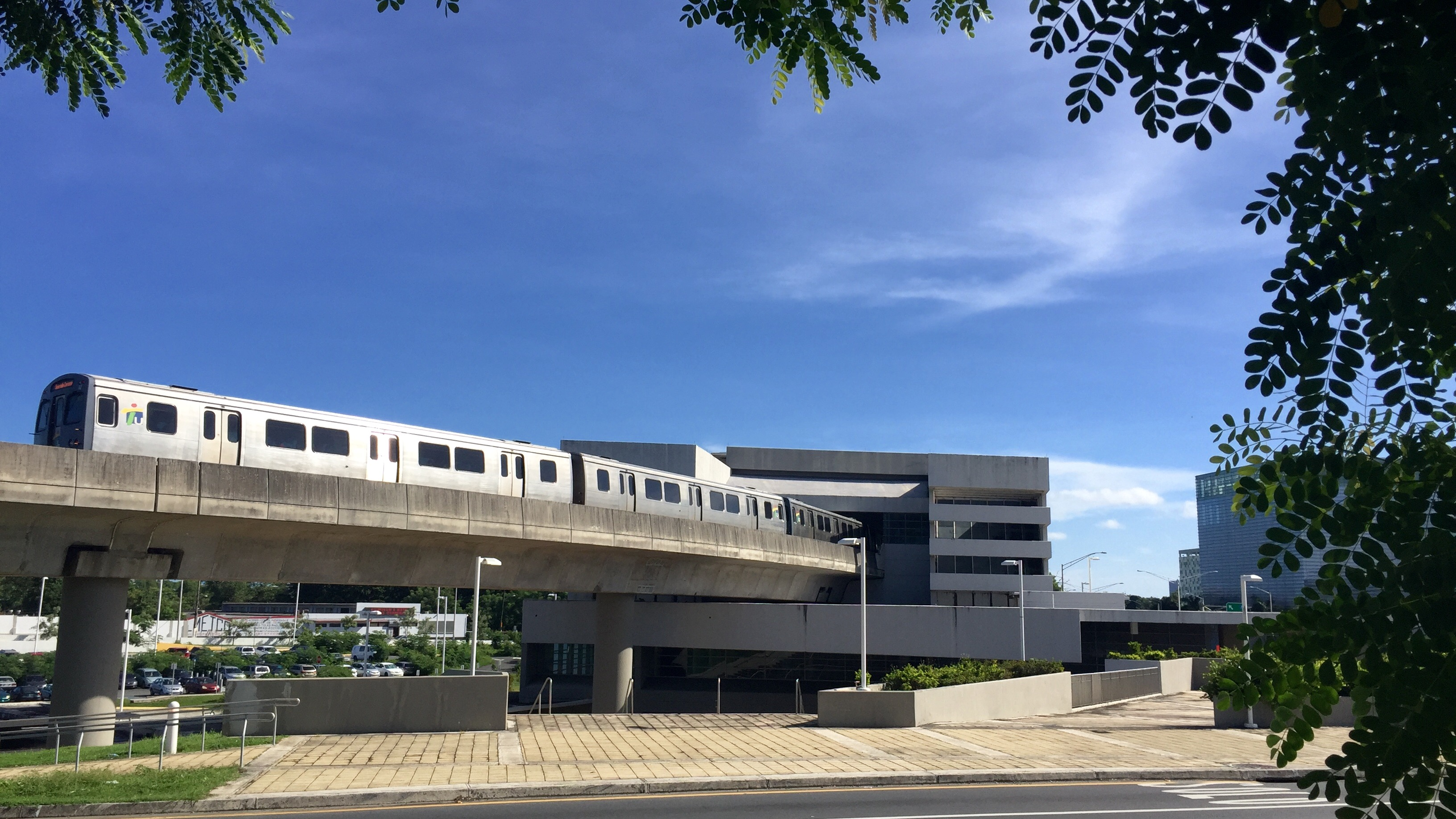
- A train entering the station

General information
- Coordinates: 18°23′26″N 66°03′47″W
- Owner: Puerto Rico Department of Transportation and Public Works
- Operator: Alternate Concepts
- Platforms: 2 side platforms
- Tracks: 2

Construction
- Structure type: Elevated

History
- Opened: December 17, 2004; 21 years ago

Services
Preceding station	Tren Urbano	Following station
Centro Médico toward Bayamón	Tren Urbano	Río Piedras toward Sagrado Corazón
Location

Cupey is a rapid transit station in San Juan agglomeration, Puerto Rico. It is located between Centro Médico and Río Piedras stations on the only line of the Tren Urbano system, in the El Cinco district of the city of San Juan. The station is named after the barrio of Cupey, located further south. The trial service ran in 2004, however, the regular service only started on 6 June 2005.

== Bus terminal ==
The bus terminal is located western entrance to the station.

- E30 (MU): Cupey TU station (through PR-52) – Caguas Pueblo (downtown) bus terminal
- T7: Cupey TU station (through PR-3) – Carolina Pueblo (downtown) bus terminal
- T9: Cupey TU station (through PR-35) – Old San Juan Covadonga bus terminal
- 17: Cupey TU station – Centro Médico TU station – Piñero TU station
- 18: Cupey TU station – Centro Médico TU station – Alturas de Cupey
- 31: Cupey TU station – Emiliano Pol

In addition to AMA services, the bus terminal also has connections to municipal buses, carros públicos and the Interamerican University of Puerto Rico Metropolitan Campus trolley system.

== Nearby ==
- Ana G. Méndez University, Universidad Metropolitana (UMET)
- Molecular Sciences Research Center
- Puerto Rico Department of Natural and Environmental Resources
- San Juan Botanical Garden (Botanical Garden of the University of Puerto Rico)
- San Juan Waterworks
- Villa Nevárez Cemetery

== Gallery ==
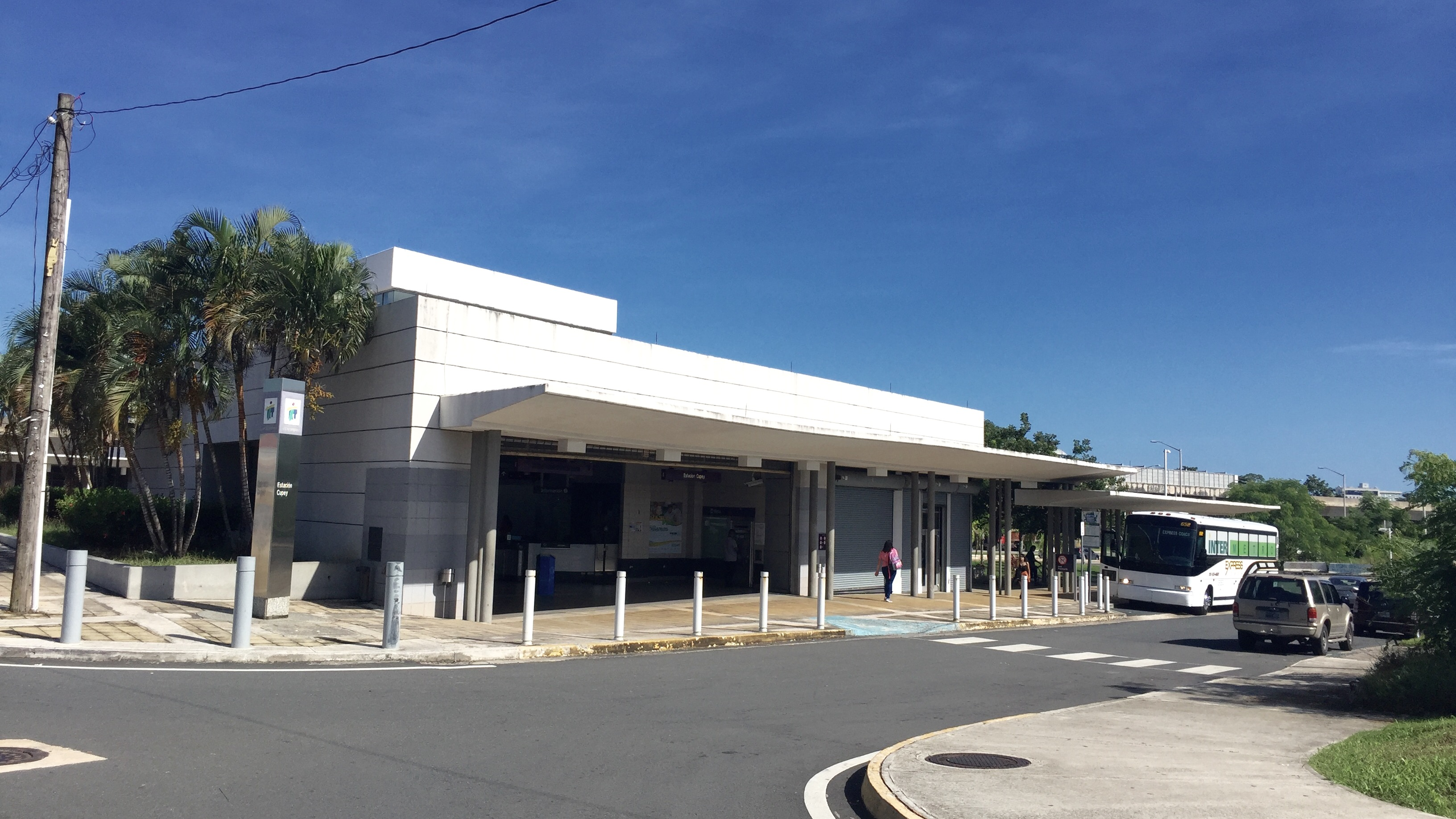
Eastern entrance next to the Universidad Metropolitana (UMET) campus

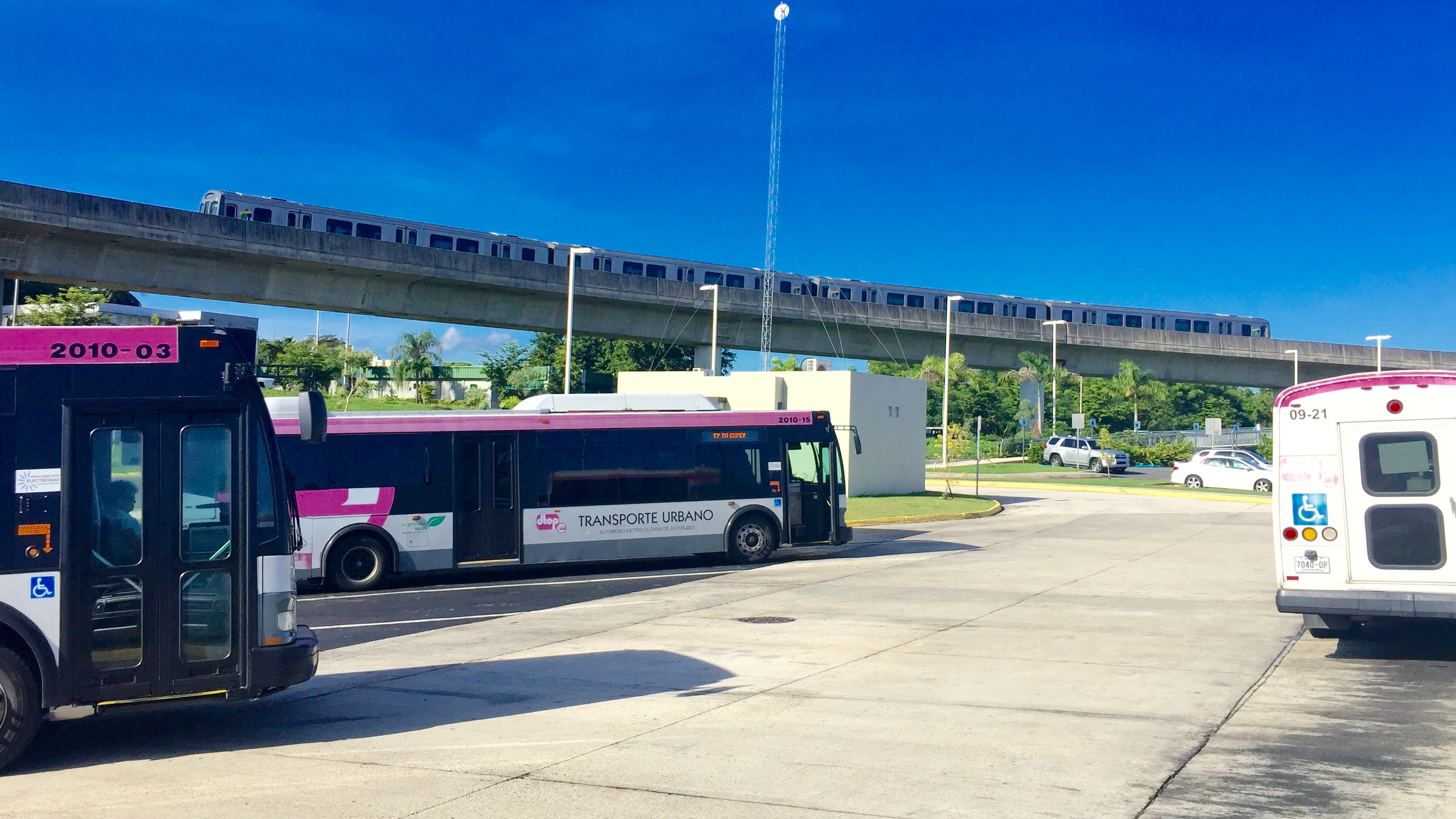
Bus terminal located by the western entrance to the station
