= Valencia, Universidad =

Subbarrio in San Juan, Puerto Rico

Coordinates: 18.4118714°N 66.0413010°W

Valencia
- Subbarrio
- Interactive map of Valencia
- Commonwealth: Puerto Rico
- Municipality: San Juan
- Barrio: Universidad

Government
  - Type: Borough of San Juan
  - Borough President: Jorge Santini
  - Secretary of Education: Jesús Rivera Sánchez

Population
  - Total: 1,268
- Source: 2000 United States census

Valencia is one out of 4 sectors in Universidad.
