= Auxilio Mutuo, Universidad =

Subbarrio of San Juan, Puerto Rico

Coordinates: 18.4104752°N 66.0489120°W

Auxilio Mutuo
- Subbarrio
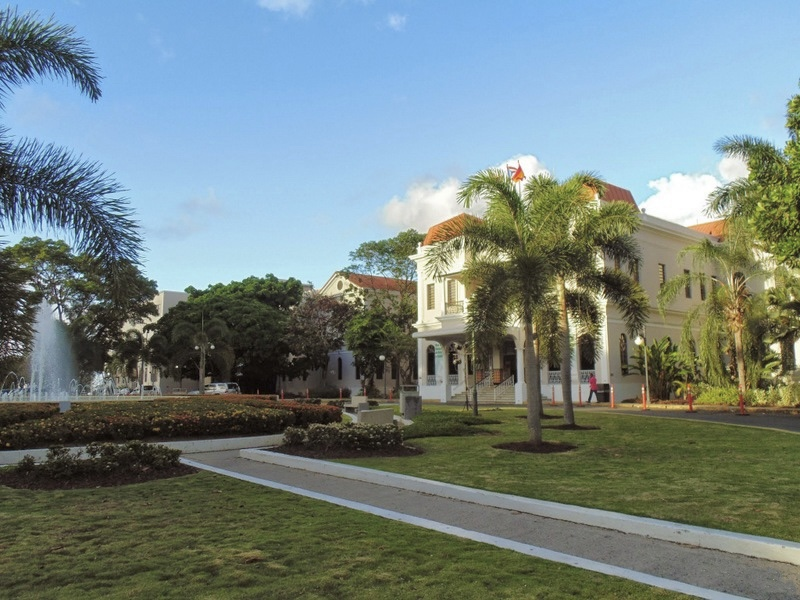
- Auxilio Mutuo Hospital in Auxilio Mutuo subbarrio
- Interactive map of Auxilio Mutuo
- Commonwealth: Puerto Rico
- Municipality: San Juan
- Barrio: Universidad

Government
  - Type: Mayor of San Juan
  - Mayor: Miguel Romero

Population
  - Total: 1,089
- Source: 2000 United States census

Auxilio Mutuo is one of the 5 subbarrios of Universidad, itself one of 18 barrios of San Juan, Puerto Rico.
