= T.U.S.C.A. =

Transportation and land use plan for Puerto Rico, created in 1970-1971

T.U.S.C.A. was a transportation and land use plan for Puerto Rico, created in 1970-1971.

T.U.S.C.A. stands for “Transportation and Urban Settlement Combined Action”. It was a visionary transportation and land use plan prepared by a team of planners, engineers and landscape architects headed by Etienne Dusart for the Commonwealth of Puerto Rico's Planning Board.

Preparation of the T.U.S.C.A. plan was financed jointly by both the United States Department of Housing and Urban Development (HUD) and the U.S. Department of Transportation (DOT Contract No DOT-UT-402) and by the Government of the Commonwealth of Puerto Rico. Its purpose was to connect the cities and towns around the entire coastal plain of the Island of Puerto Rico with a transit system and to construct a series of new towns served by that transit system. A report for this pioneering study was published by the Puerto Rico Planning Board in 1971: "TUSCA Project-Preliminary Planning Study", 1971, 534 pages. That report is available from TRIS (PB-211 841).

Due to the unwillingness of the Commonwealth of Puerto Rico to invest the necessary resources in the project, the plan was never implemented. See "The color of politics: Red, blue … and green" by Susan Fairbanks, San Juan Star, July 2, 2007.

Twenty years later, in 1990-1992, David Fairchild --one of the original planners for THE 1971 T.U.S.C.A. plan -- returned to Puerto Rico and conducted travel surveys for a 20-year passenger demand forecast just for the San Juan Metro area. That final 1992 forecast of rail passenger demand was, however, for a much longer transit system than the subsequent Tren Urbano as constructed.
