= Tren Urbano =

Rapid transit system in Puerto Rico

Coordinates: 18.39055°N 66.10618°W

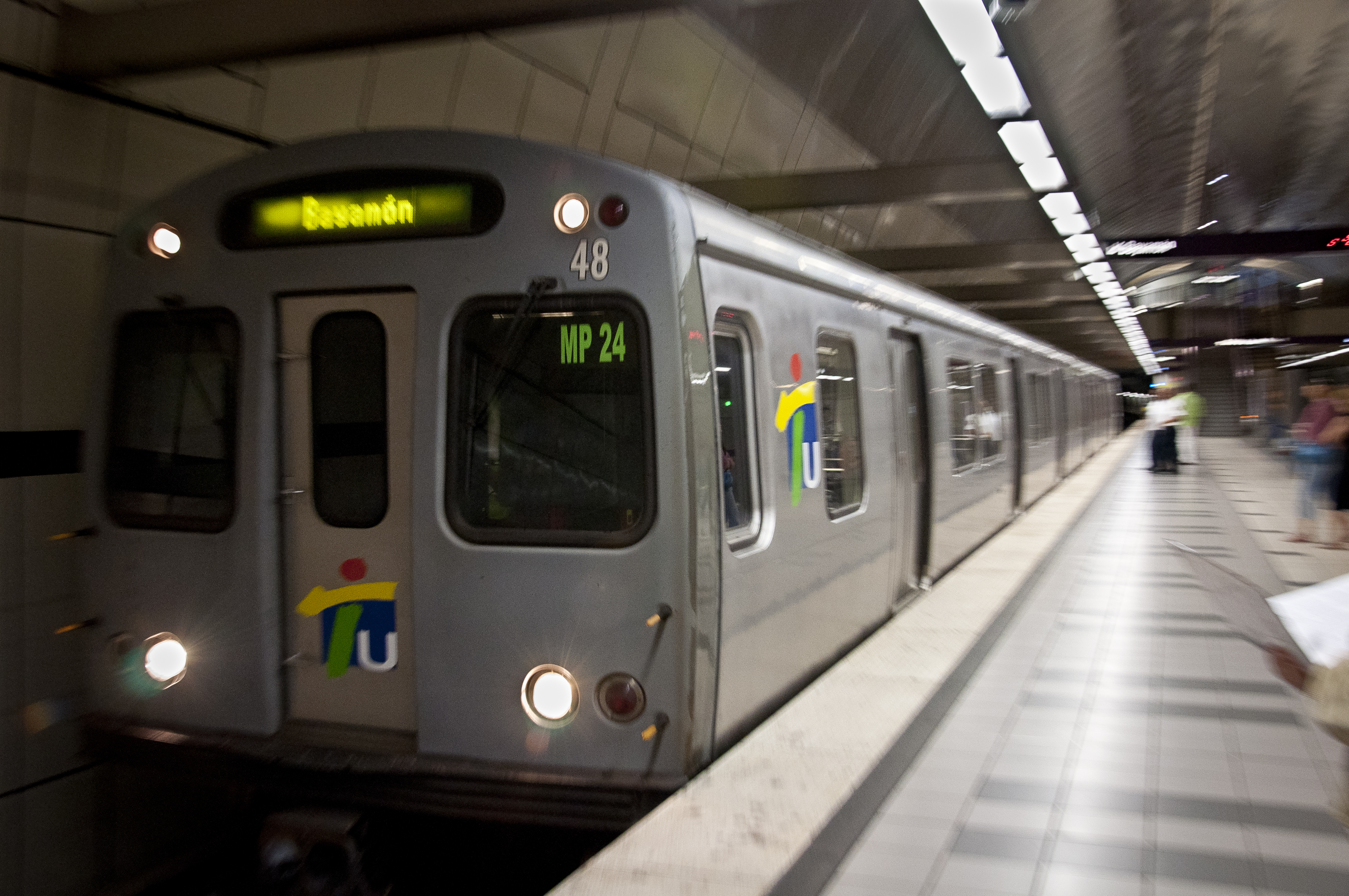
- Bayamón-bound train arriving at Río Piedras station

Overview
- Owner: Puerto Rico Department of Transportation and Public Works
- Locale: San Juan, Guaynabo and Bayamón
- Transit type: Rapid transit
- Number of stations: 16
- Daily ridership: 20,900 (weekdays, Q2 2026)
- Annual ridership: 4,438,400 (2025)
- Headquarters: Guaynabo, Puerto Rico
- Website: tutrenpr.com

Operation
- Began operation: December 17, 2004; 21 years ago
- Operator: Alternate Concepts
- Number of vehicles: 74
- Train length: 4 vehicles (two permanently coupled pairs) during peak hours; 2 vehicles (one permanently coupled pair) during off-peak hours, weekends and holidays
- Headway: 8 minutes (peak); 12 minutes (off peak)

Technical
- System length: 10.7 mi (17.2 km)
- Track gauge: 4 ft 8 1/2 in (1,435 mm) standard gauge
- Electrification: Third rail, 750 V DC
- Average speed: 20.6 mph (33.2 km/h) (including stops)
- Top speed: 62 mph (100 km/h)

The Tren Urbano (English: Urban Train) is a 10.7-mile (17.2 km) automated rapid transit system serving the main metropolitan area of Puerto Rico, specifically the capital municipality of San Juan, and the adjacent municipalities of Guaynabo and Bayamón in the northeast of the main island. The Tren Urbano consists of 16 stations operating on 10.7 miles (17.2 km) of track along a single line. In 2025, the system had a ridership of 4,438,400, or about 20,900 per weekday as of the second quarter of 2026.

The Tren Urbano complements other forms of public transportation services in the San Juan metropolitan area such as the Metropolitan Bus Authority, the Cataño Ferry, taxis, and shuttles. The entire mass transportation system is operated by the Integrated Transit Authority (ATI), The Tren Urbano system is operated by Alternate Concepts, Inc. (ACI). Tren Urbano is also the Caribbean's first rapid transit system.

== History ==
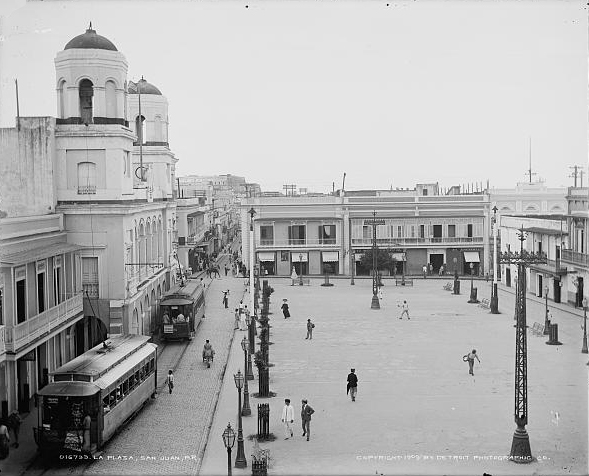
Tramway in front of City Hall in Plaza de Armas, Old San Juan (circa 1902)

In the late 19th century, while the island was under Spanish rule, regional rail systems were begun in Puerto Rico. The railroad continued to be in use under American rule for most of the first half of the 20th century and played a key role in the transportation of people and goods throughout the island. The railroad systems of the period also played a vital role in the sugarcane industry.

From 1901 to 1946 San Juan had a street tramway network, known as the "Trolley" de San Juan, and was operated by the Porto Rico Railway, Light and Power Company with more than 20 miles (32 km) of tracks and ran between San Juan and Santurce. During its heyday, it was the most modern electric streetcar system in Puerto Rico, rivaled New York and Toronto, and transported nearly 10 million passengers a year.

During the 1950s, an industrial boom, partly from development programs such as Operation Bootstrap, led to the downfall of agriculture as the principal industry on the island. Automobiles became more widely available, and more efficient roads and highways and the closure of sugarcane mills displaced the need for rail transportation. Soon, it was realized that an alternative means of mass transportation was needed to complement the public bus system to alleviate the severe traffic situation that was being created, especially in the San Juan metropolitan area.

=== Return of rail transit ===
==== Proposals ====
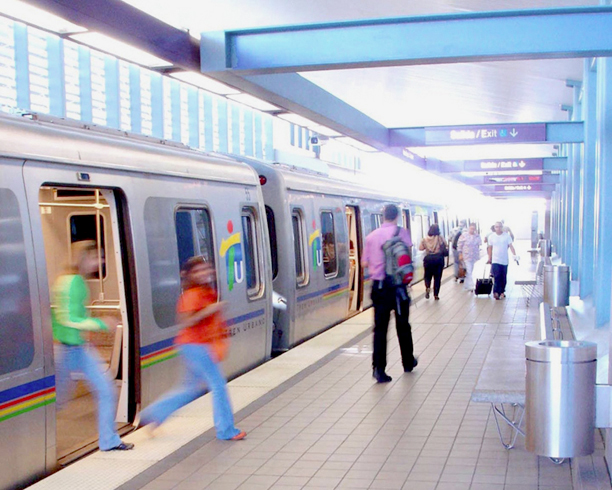
Passengers disembarking at Roosevelt Station

In 1967, proposals were made for the construction of a rapid rail transit system to serve San Juan. In 1971, the major T.U.S.C.A. study, funded jointly by the Puerto Rico Planning Board and the US federal government, recommended an islandwide elevated transit system and new community development program. That proposal would have served the San Juan metropolitan area and connected it with the rest of the island without the necessity of highway construction. However, it was not until 1989 that the Puerto Rico Department of Transportation and Public Works (Departamento de Transportación y Obras Públicas, or DTOP in Spanish) officially adopted a proposal to begin design and construction of a rail system for the San Juan metropolitan area. By 1992, various alignments of the proposed system were considered, but the final design chosen served only certain parts of the metro area and did not include Old San Juan. The name "Tren Urbano" (Urban Train) was chosen for the system. In 1993, the Federal Transit Administration (FTA) selected it as a Turnkey Demonstration Project under the Intermodal Surface Transportation Efficiency Act of 1991. In 1996 and 1997, seven design-build contracts were awarded for different segments of the Tren Urbano Phase 1 system.

A number of companies shared the tasks for building the Tren Urbano including Siemens, which was granted a concession to design and build the line and its rolling stock and to operate it for the first five years. The company won a contract in July 1996, the first of its kind in North America.

==== Construction ====
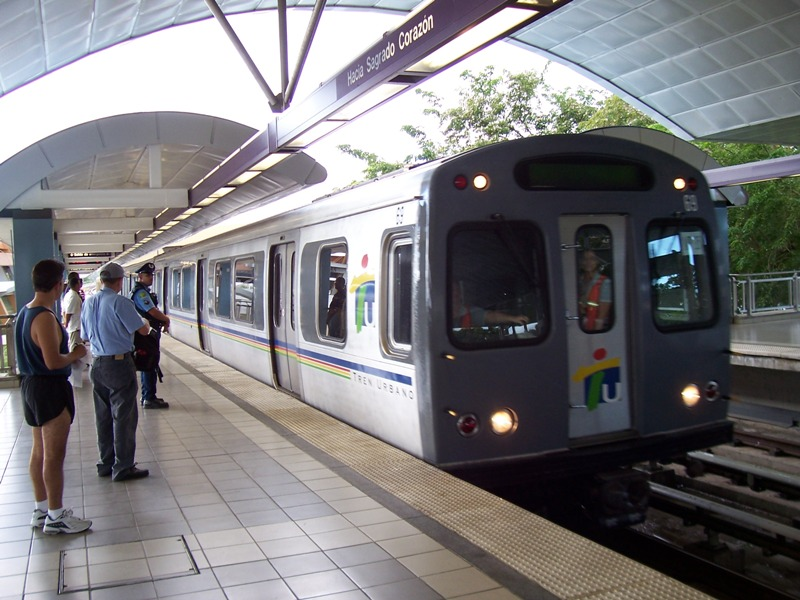
Bayamón Station

The construction project was plagued by delays, contractual disputes between the government and companies involved in the undertaking, and investigations into possible mismanagement of funds. The project cost was US$2.28 billion.

==== Free service ====
The rail system was officially inaugurated on December 19, 2004. Free service was then offered on weekends until April 2005, when weekdays were added to the free service. Popularity grew quickly, and by the end of the free period, 40,000 people were using the train on a daily basis. By late 2005, however, ridership had fallen to 24,000, well below the projection of 110,000 for 2010.

==== Paid service ====
Paid fare service started on June 6, 2005. In 2006, average weekday boardings stood at 28,179 and in 2007, ridership decreased to 27,567. By the third quarter of 2008, average weekday ridership had increased to 36,500.

==== Issues and concerns ====
The Tren Urbano has no service to Old San Juan, Santurce, Luis Muñoz Marín International Airport or to many other parts of Guaynabo, Bayamón, and San Juan, and it does not serve important suburbs like Cataño, Toa Baja, Toa Alta, Carolina, Trujillo Alto, and Canóvanas, limiting ridership. Some question the viability of the system for additional reasons, such as the lack of an island-wide public-transportation system, such as the T.U.S.C.A. system proposed in 1971. The inner-city public bus transportation system, the Metropolitan Bus Authority (AMA), which operates in the Greater San Juan Metro Area, is considered unreliable by most people, and does not have a regular schedule. Integration with other transit systems, such as the AMA and the AcuaExpreso (an urban ferry), was initially poor and remains a challenge for the DTOP.

==== COVID-19 crisis ====
During the COVID-19 pandemic, services on the Tren Urbano were halted by executive order to stop the spread of the virus.

== Route ==
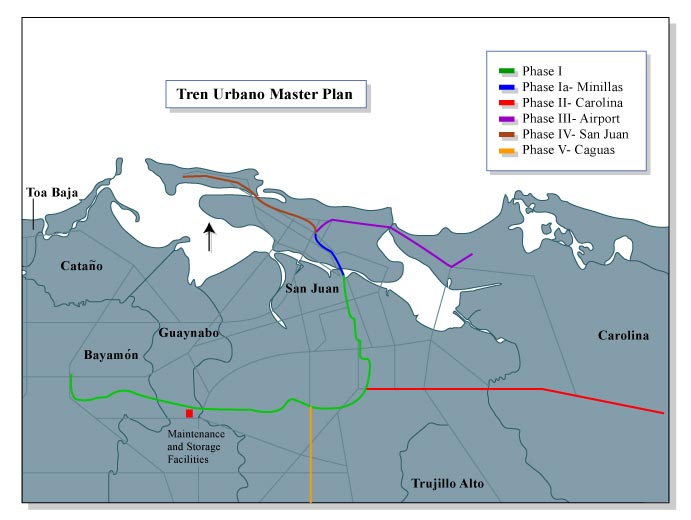
Tren Urbano Master Plan: Phase1, Phase Ia-Minillas, PhaseII-Carolina.

Tren Urbano operates on a single route through mostly suburban areas. The line has 16 stations, ten of which are elevated, four at grade or in open cuttings, and two underground. All stations are designed to handle three permanently-coupled pairs (6 cars). The stations in the system are:

- Sagrado Corazón (Sagrado Corazón)
- Hato Rey (Golden Mile / José Miguel Agrelot Coliseum)
- Roosevelt (Roosevelt Ave. and Ponce de León Ave.)
- Domenech (Hato Rey)
- Piñero (Hato Rey)
- Universidad (University of Puerto Rico at Río Piedras)
- Río Piedras (Río Piedras)
- Cupey
- Centro Médico (Puerto Rico Medical Services Administration and University of Puerto Rico, Medical Sciences Campus)
- San Francisco (535 parking spaces)
- Las Lomas
- Martínez Nadal (1,200 parking spaces)
- Torrimar (Guaynabo) (45 parking spaces)
- Jardines (128 parking spaces)
- Deportivo (Juan Ramón Loubriel Stadium and Coliseo Rubén Rodríguez)
- Bayamón (Bayamón) (400 parking spaces)

Each station boasts unique artwork and architectural style.

=== Fares ===
Tren Urbano fare card in 2012

A single trip costs $1.50 ($0.75 if customers transfer from an AMA bus), including a 1-hour bus transfer period. If a customer exits the station and wants to get back on the train, the full fare must be re-paid; there is no train-to-train transfer period. Students and seniors (aged 60–74) pay 75 cents per trip. Senior citizens older than 75 and children under 6 ride for free. Several unlimited-ride passes are also available.

A stored-value multi-use farecard may be used for travel on buses and trains. The value on the card is automatically deducted each time that it is used. The system is similar to the MetroCard system used in New York City.

In February 2024 the Integrated Transport Authority announced a complete overhaul of its fare collection system. The new fare system will have a contactless payment card and will have NFC readers that will accept contactless debit and credit cards as well as Apple Pay, Google Pay and Samsung Pay, and smart watches. The system is being installed by Cubic, and is similar to the New York City Subway's OMNY card.

=== Rolling stock ===
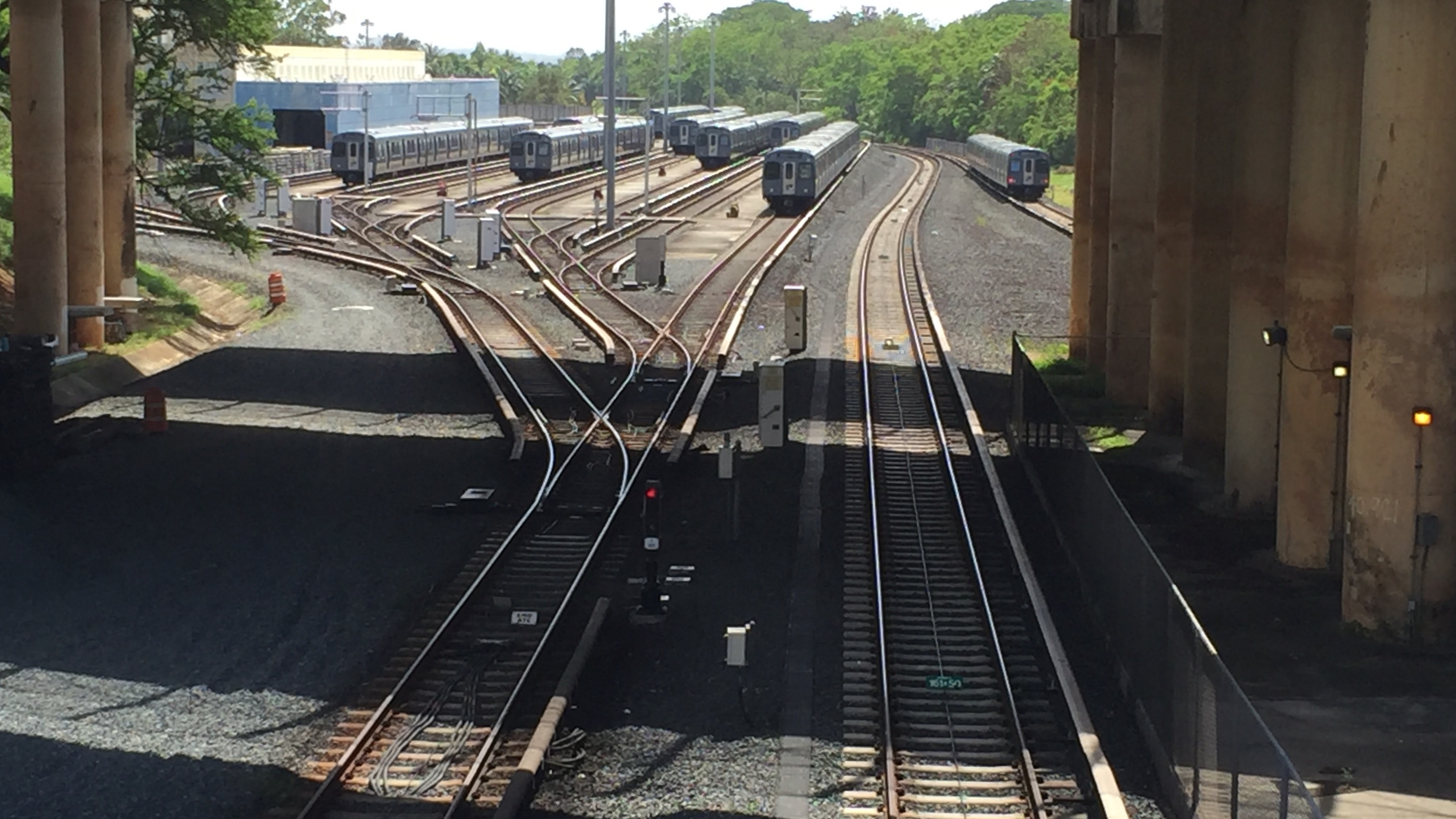
Tren Urbano maintenance and storage facilities

Tren Urbano's fleet consists of 74 stainless steel-bodied cars, each 75 feet (23 m) long. Each vehicle carries 72 seated and 108 standing passengers. Trains are capable of a maximum speed of 62 miles per hour (100 km/h) but average 20.6 miles per hour (33.2 km/h) during regular operation, including stops. All cars operate as married pairs, and up to three pairs run together at any given time. Tren Urbano operates 15 trains during rush hours, with the remaining cars serving as spares. The rolling stock was assembled at the Siemens plant in Florin, California.

Power is provided by AC traction motors, which were chosen over DC since they contain fewer moving parts and require less maintenance. The trains share many characteristics with the stock built by Siemens for MBTA's Blue Line route (700 series). The system is electrified by third rail at 750 V DC.

Air-conditioning systems have been specially designed to cope with the hot and muggy conditions that are commonly experienced in the metropolitan area.

A yellow powered flat car is visible at the maintenance facility. Some metro cars have been used to transport material when they are not in service.

=== Tren Urbano facilities ===
Rolling stock for Tren Urbano metro cars are stored at the Hogar del Niño Operations and Maintenance Building, near the exit to PR-21 from PR-20 and a short distance from Martínez Nadal station. The metro cars are stored on outdoor tracks.

Both Bayamón and Sagrado Corazon stations have terminal tracks with capacity to store two train sets.

=== Bus terminals ===
The bus system in the San Juan metropolitan area has been reoriented around the Tren Urbano. Five train stations also serve as bus terminals: Sagrado Corazón, Piñero, Cupey, Martínez Nadal, and Bayamón.

== Expansion plans ==
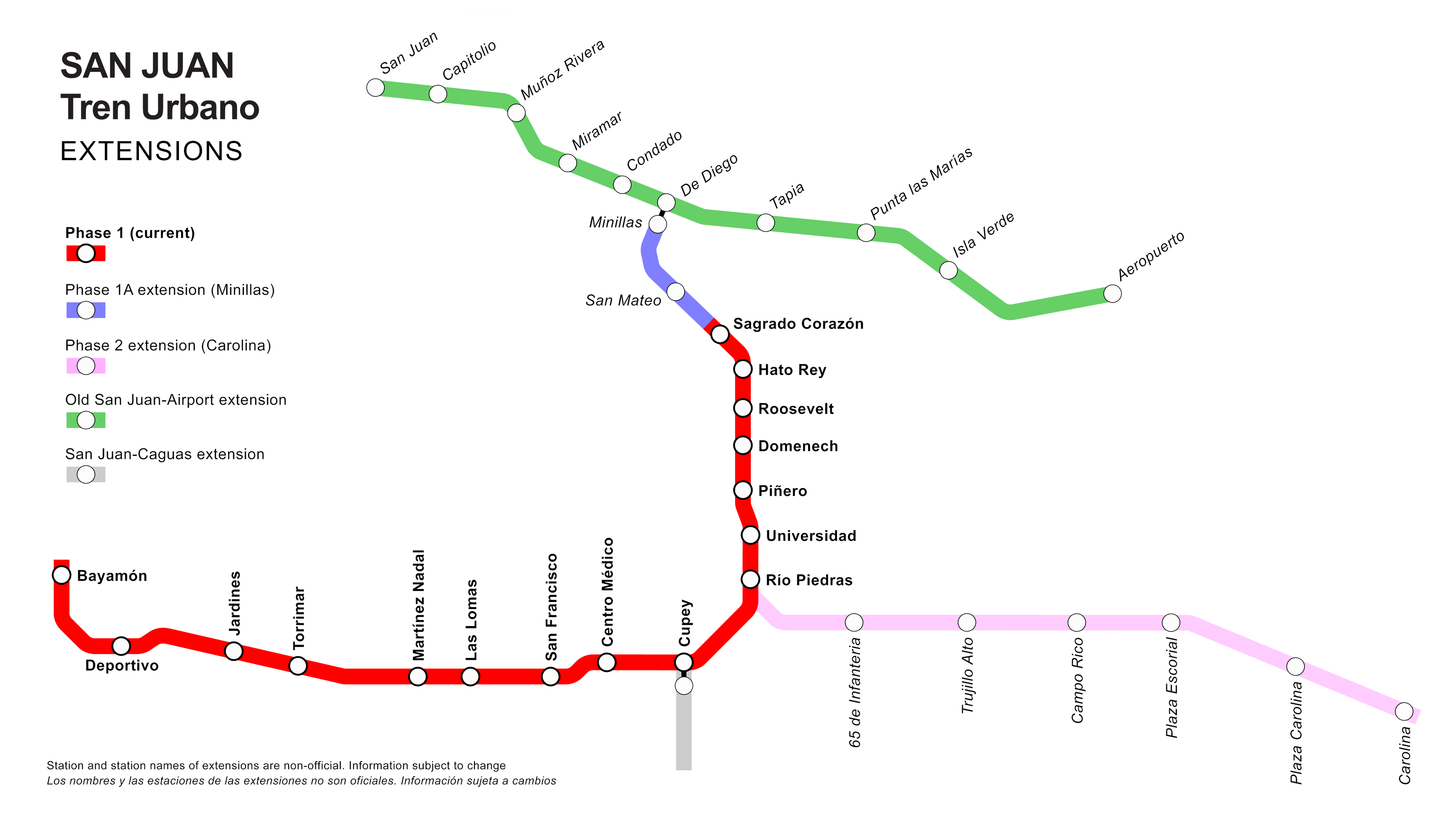
Map of the Urban Train, including future extensions planned by the Department of Transportation and Public Works of Puerto Rico (DTOP)

The infrastructure of the Tren Urbano, with stations built for six–car train sets and a minimum headway of 90 seconds, has a maximum capacity of 40,000 passengers per hour per direction, compared to 3,000 passengers per hour per direction for the current peak hour 8 minute headway and 4-car trains and to an actual daily ridership of roughly 40,000. The system thus operates at 13% capacity, well under the 110,000 rail passengers planned by 2010.

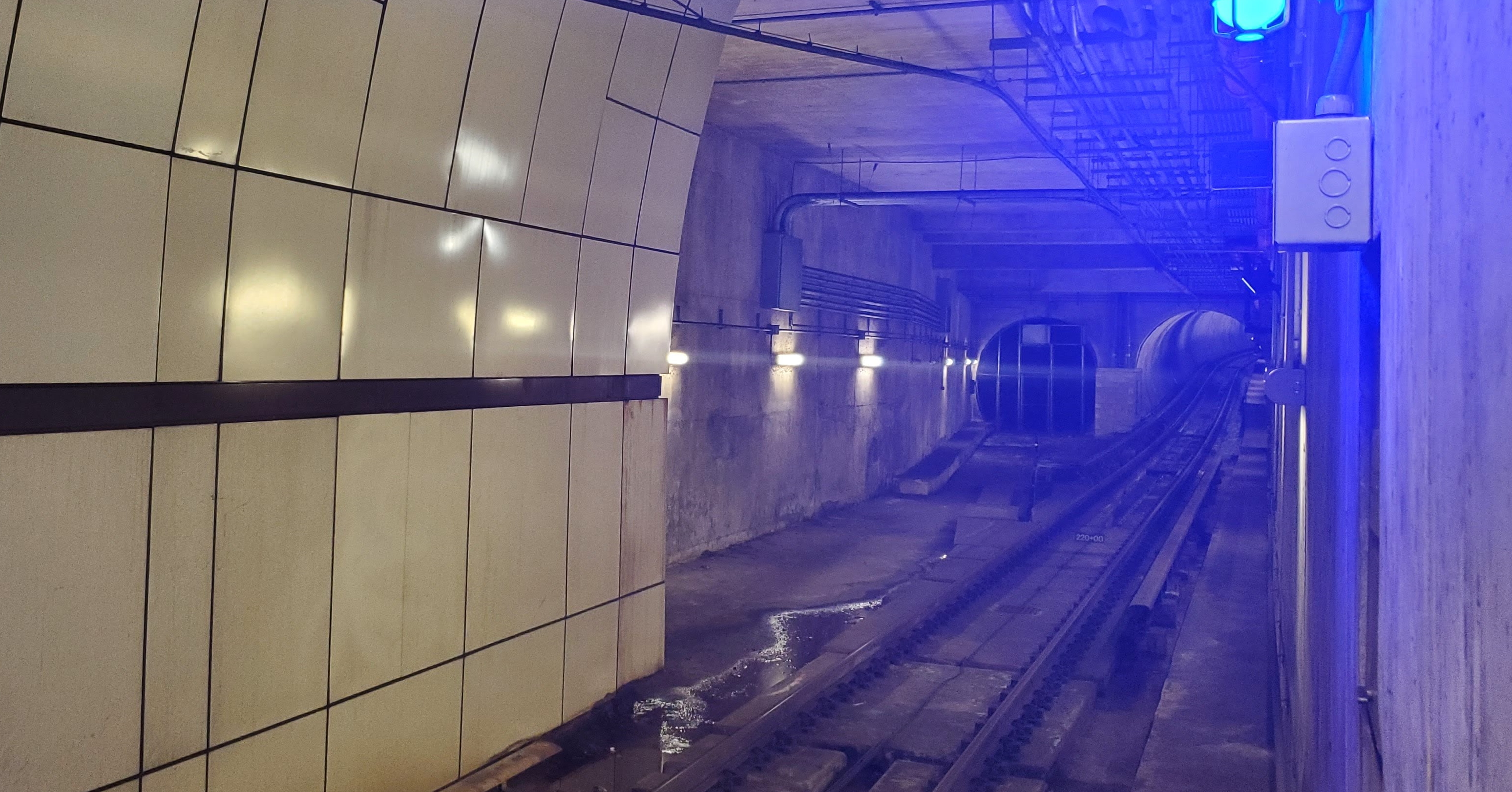
Carolina Tunnel (1 of 2) at the Río Piedras subway station.

With a fleet of 74 rail vehicles in the local yard to cover at least twice the 10.7-mile (17.2-km) system length, the basic facilities and capital equipment needed for expansion are in place. The system was originally intended to include higher-density areas of the central district, which would make operations more successful and sustainable.

The Puerto Rico's Department of Transportation and Public Works (DTPW) has identified the following future phases:

=== Phase 1A ===
- Phase 1A includes the extension of the original line westward from the current terminal at Sagrado Corazón (Sacred Heart) through a medium- to high-density corridor with two stations: San Mateo to a new terminal at Minillas at the heart of Santurce, a distance of 1,500 meters, with a possible transfer from Minillas to a future tram line from the historic district of Old San Juan to Luis Muñoz Marín International Airport. Phase 1A was approved by the United States Environmental Protection Agency.
- By the end of fiscal 2008, the legislature identified federal funds for the expansion of the train in its second phase. It was expected that during fiscal year 2009, the legislature would begin to issue bonds for that purpose. As of 2019, there are no plans to expand Tren Urbano.

=== Phase 2 ===
- Upon opening of the Tren Urbano, there were further proposals to extend the rail system to other municipalities such as Carolina. A two-way tunnel, 136 ft (42 meters) long, south of the Río Piedras Station is already built for a future expansion along the heavily-transited 65th Infantry Avenue.
- In 2012, the government informed that it had no plans to expand the Tren Urbano in the future and that it was considering other alternatives to help alleviate traffic.

=== Phase 3 ===
- In 2016, Tren Urbano contracted ACI-Herzog, a joint venture of ACI and Herzog, to improve the reliability and performance of the propulsion system. ACI-Herzog then successfully collaborated with AmePower to achieve this goal by conducting a modernization of 74 Tren Urbano train cars using Insulated-Gate Bipolar Transistor (IGBT) technology. The project was completed in March 2017.

=== Other projects ===
There are several projects to improve public transport connectivity:

- Also being considered (2008) is a tramway from Sagrado Corazón station to colonial Old San Juan in Puerta de Tierra, where many of Puerto Rico's state government buildings are located. It would run partially on an existing right-of-way on Fernández Juncos Ave. The first line of the tramway would be built by the Municipality of San Juan (MSJ) and will be known as the Sistema de Asistencia, Transportación y Organización Urbana (System of Assistance, Transportation and Urban Organization) (SATOUR).
- There is a proposal to build a second tram line to Carolina, possibly with a station at Luis Muñoz Marín International Airport.
- The extension of a line to Caguas from the Centro Médico or Cupey stations has been considered.
- A second plan for the development of a line to Caguas with a new "Light regional railcar" network system would have future extensions throughout the island.

== See also ==
- List of Latin American rail transit systems by ridership
- List of metro systems worldwide
- List of Puerto Rico railroads
- List of United States rapid transit systems by ridership
- Metro systems by annual passenger rides
- Rail transport in Puerto Rico
- Transportation in Puerto Rico
- T.U.S.C.A.
