= Universidad station (Puerto Rico) =

Rail station of the Tren Urbano system in San Juan, Puerto Rico

Universidad
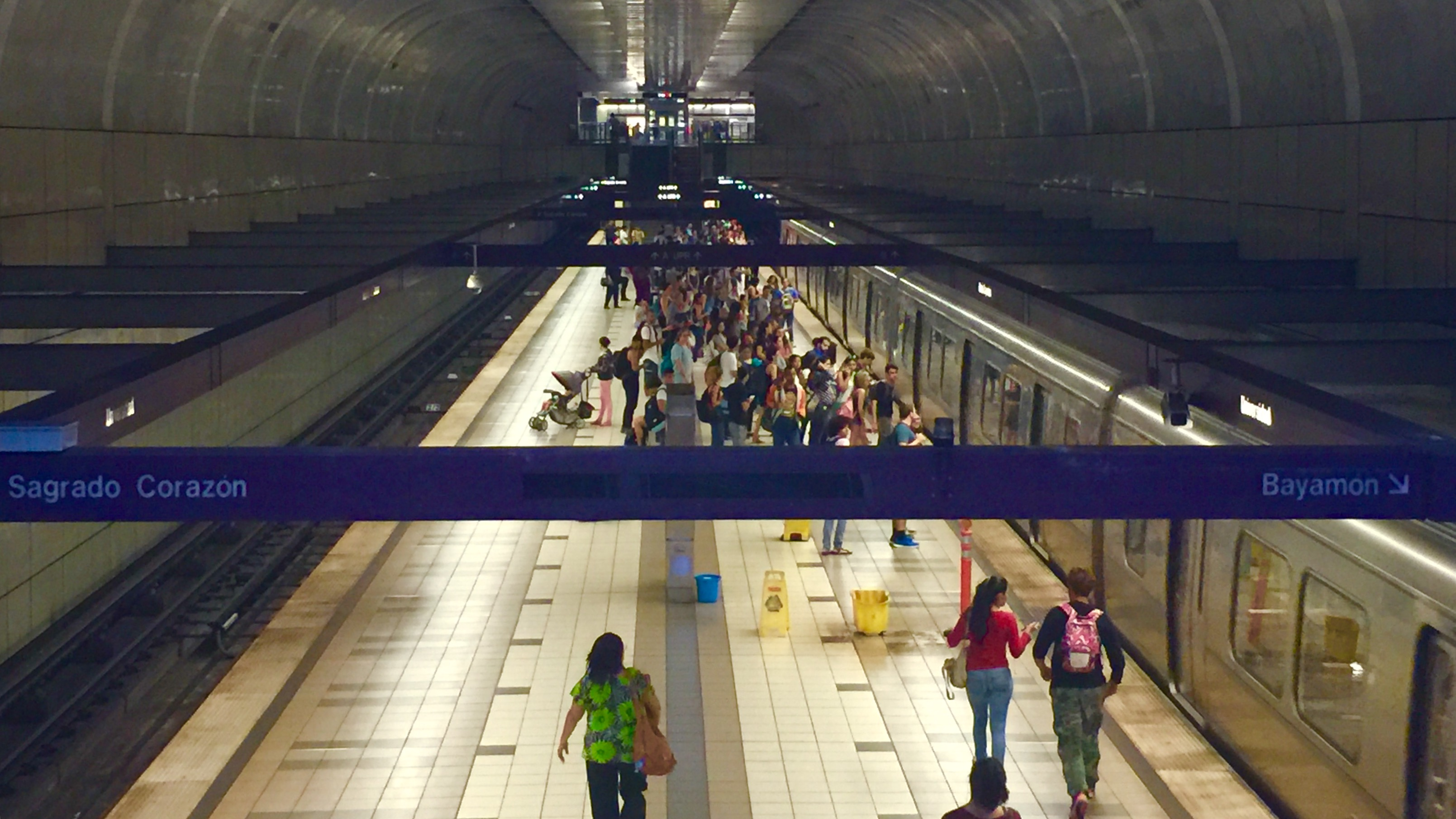
- The platform

General information
- Coordinates: 18°24′21″N 66°03′06″W
- Owner: Puerto Rico Department of Transportation and Public Works
- Operator: Alternate Concepts
- Platforms: 1 island platform
- Tracks: 2

Construction
- Structure type: Underground

History
- Opened: December 17, 2004; 21 years ago

Services
Preceding station	Tren Urbano	Following station
Río Piedras toward Bayamón	Tren Urbano	Piñero toward Sagrado Corazón
Location

Universidad is a rapid transit station in San Juan agglomeration, Puerto Rico. It is located between Río Piedras and Piñero stations on the only line of the Tren Urbano system, in the Río Piedras area of the city of San Juan. The station is named after the University of Puerto Rico campus which it serves. Trial service ran in 2004; regular service started on 6 June 2005.

== Nearby ==
- University of Puerto Rico, Río Piedras campus
- Universidad Avenue

== Gallery ==
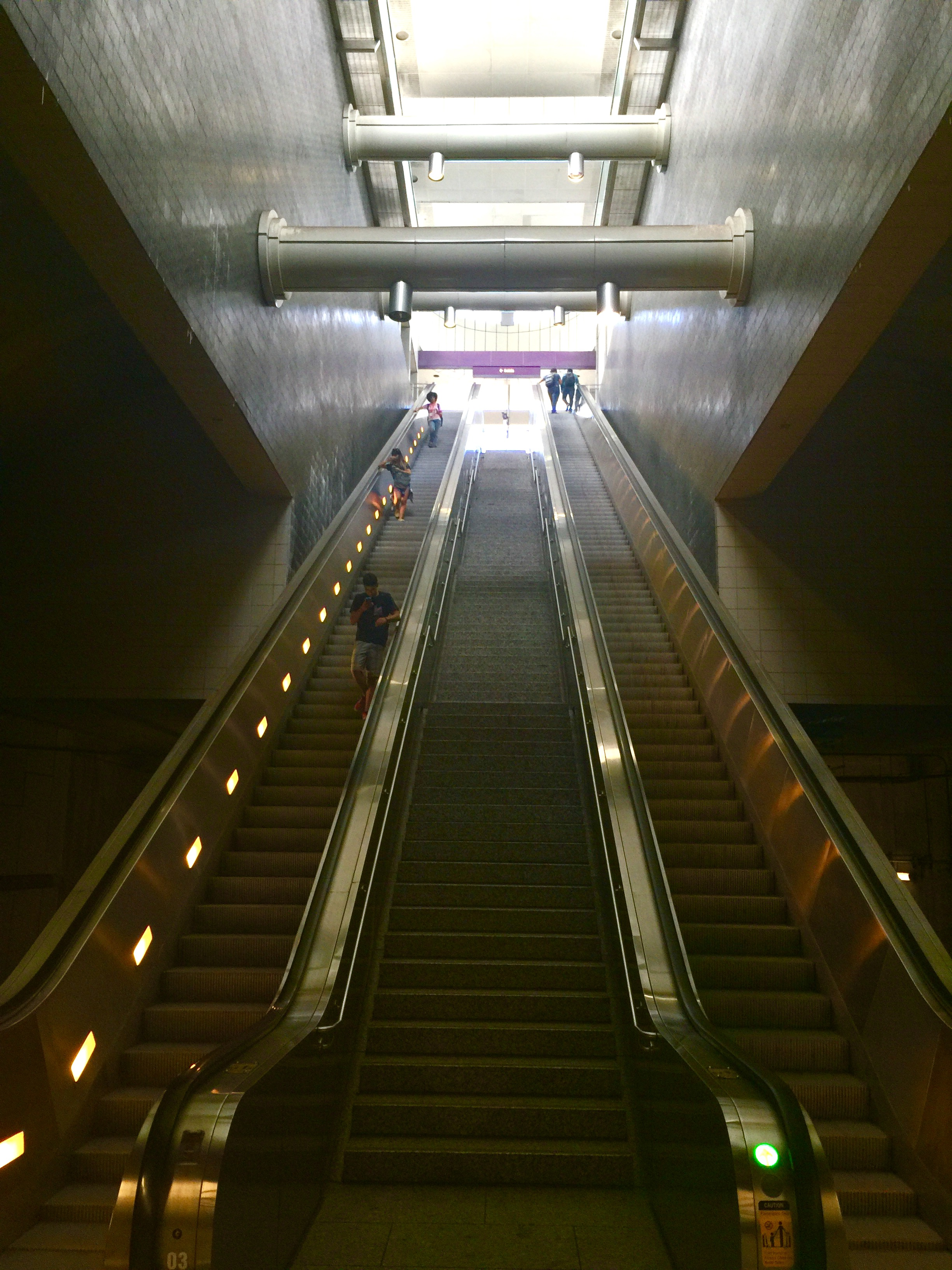
Escalators on the northern section of the station

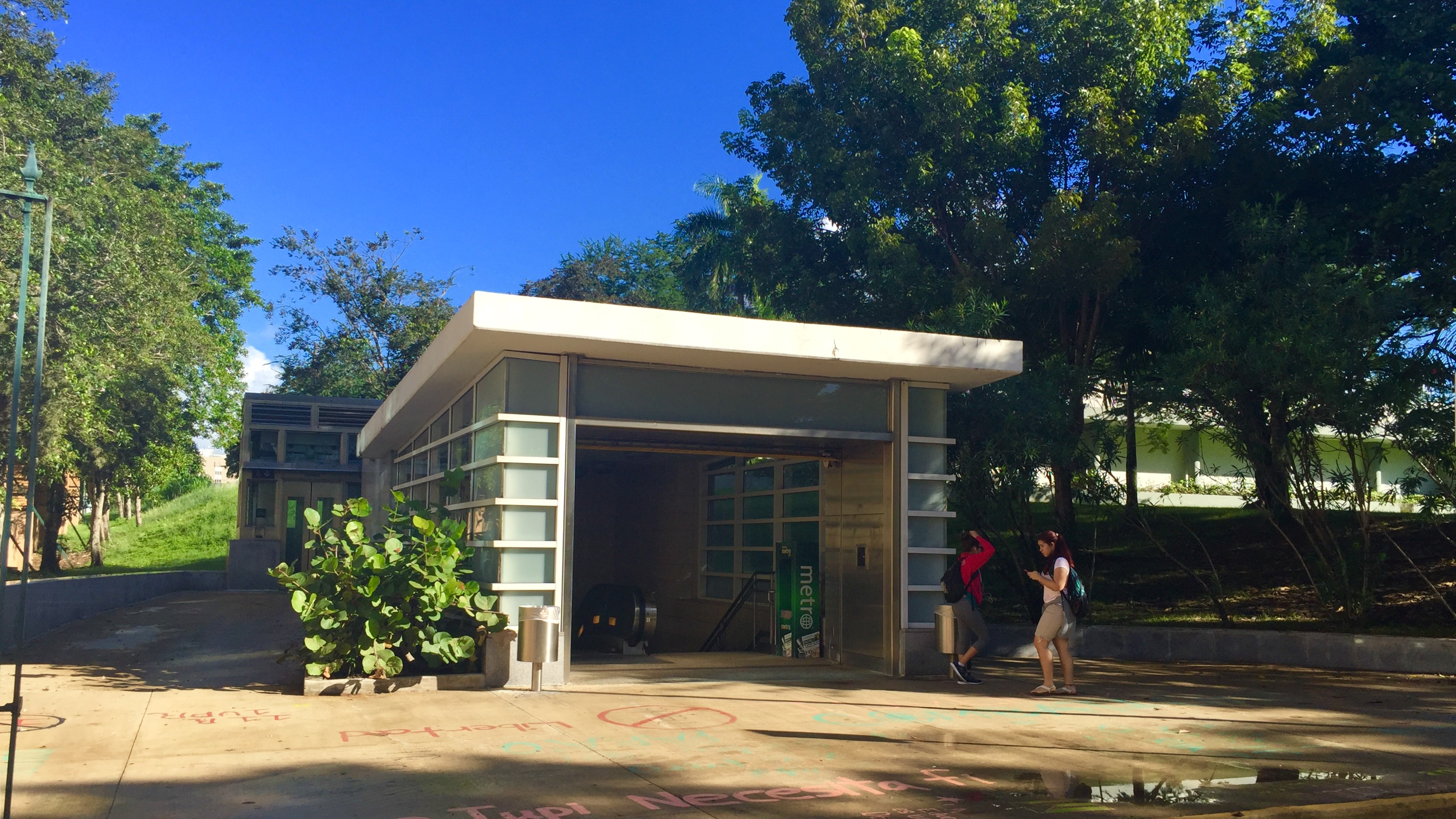
South exit of the station within the UPR campus

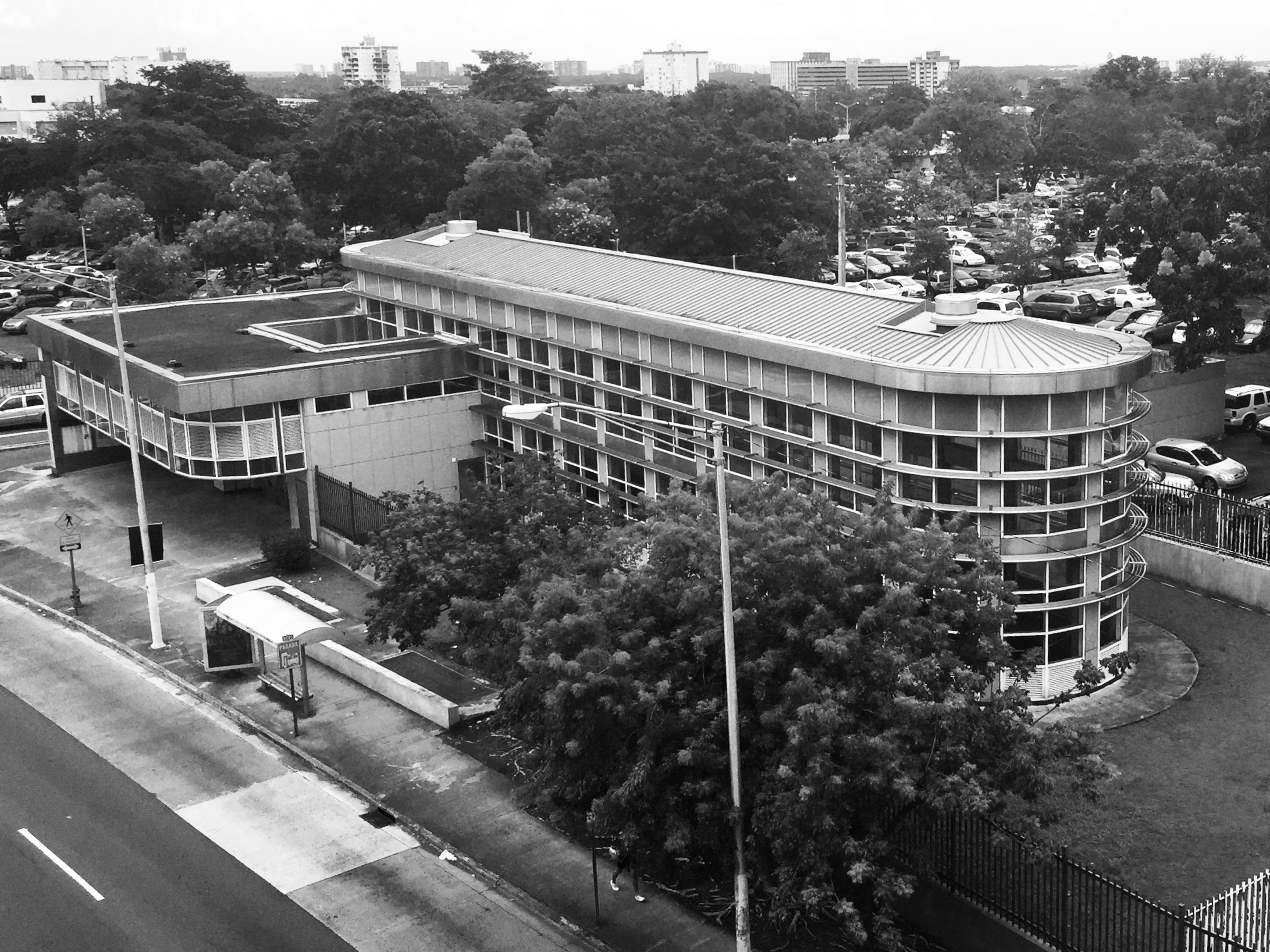
External view of the northern exit of the station
