= Gobernador Piñero, San Juan, Puerto Rico =

Administrative area of San Juan, Puerto Rico

Gobernador Piñero
- Barrio
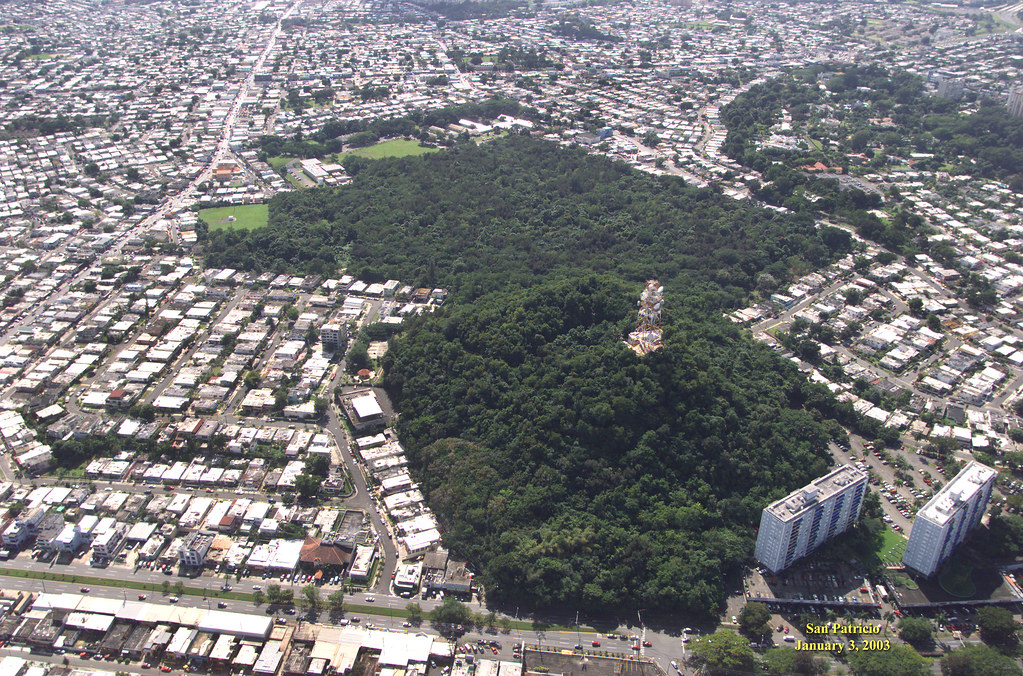
- San Patricio Forest in Gobernador Piñero

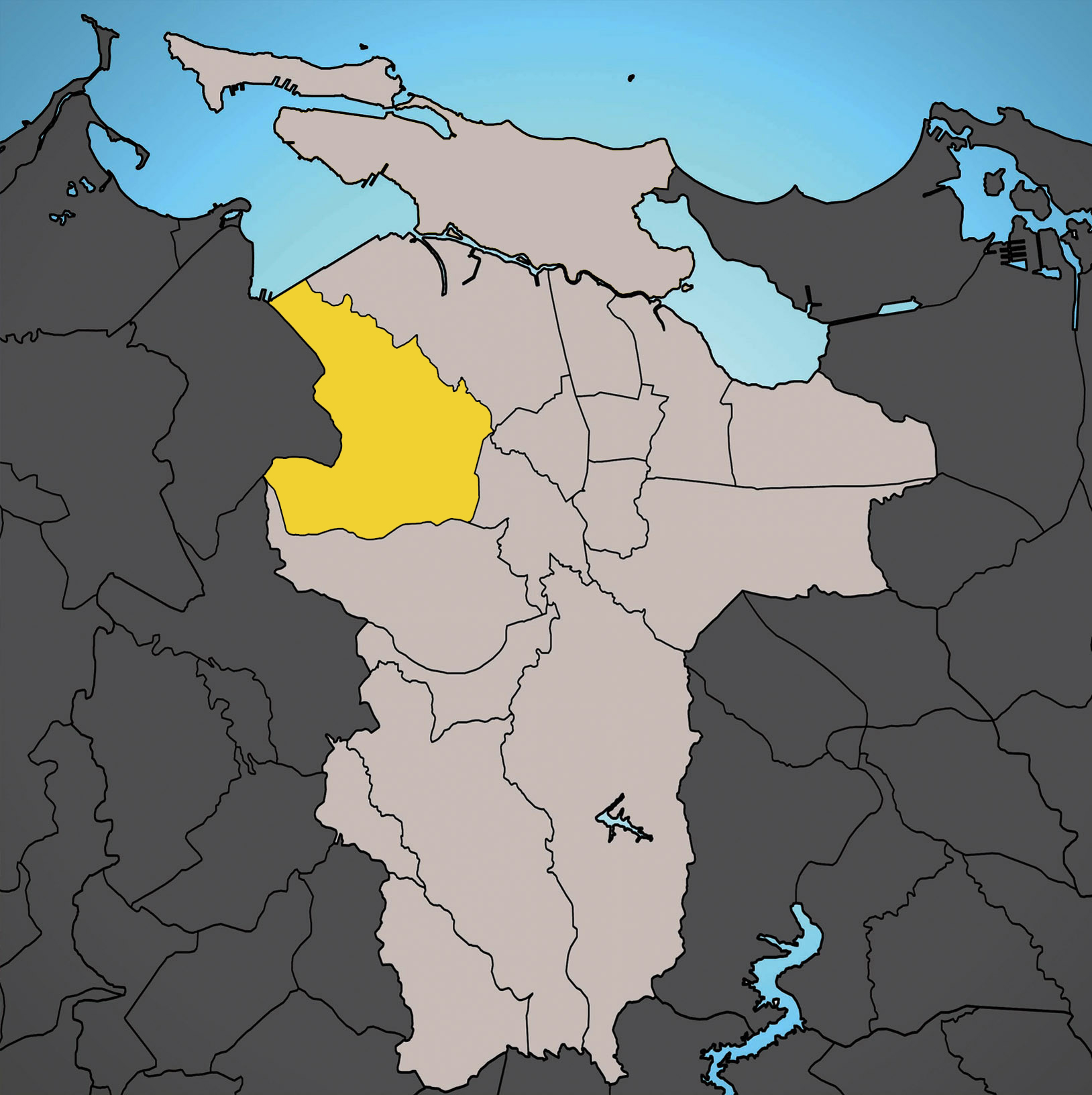
- Location of Gobernador Piñero shown in yellow.
- Coordinates: 18°24′34″N 66°05′29″W
- Commonwealth: Puerto Rico
- Municipality: San Juan

Area
  - Total: 4.83 sq mi (12.5 km^{2})
  - Land: 4.56 sq mi (11.8 km^{2})
  - Water: 0.27 sq mi (0.70 km^{2})
- Elevation: 95 ft (29 m)

Population (2020)
  - Total: 36,995
- 2020 census
- Time zone: UTC−4 (AST)

Gobernador Piñero is one of the 18 barrios of the municipality of San Juan, Puerto Rico. With a population of 36,995 (2020) living in a land area of 4.44 square miles (11.5 km^{2}), it is San Juan’s second most populated barrio after Santurce, and the fourth largest in land area.

This district is named after Jesús T. Piñero who was the first and only native Puerto Rican governor of the territory under the American colonial administration in 1946.

== Demographics ==
Historical population
Census	Pop.	Note	%±
1950	23,079		—
1970	59,896		—
1980	51,091		−14.7%
1990	49,427		−3.3%
2000	47,779		−3.3%
2010	44,006		−7.9%
2020	36,995		−15.9%
U.S. Decennial Census; 1900 (N/A) 1910-1930; 1930-1950 1980-2000 2010

== Geography ==
Gobernador Piñero is bounded to the north by the San Juan Bay and Port and Hato Rey Norte barrio, with the barrios of Hato Rey Sur and El Cinco to the east, by Monacillo Urbano to the south, and by the municipality of Guaynabo to the west.

Gobernador Piñero includes the areas of Puerto Nuevo (including Puerto Nuevo Norte), Villa Borinquen, Bosque Urbano de San Patricio, Caparra Terrace and Centro Médico.

== Landmarks and places of interest ==
- Luis Muñoz Marín Park, one of the main city parks of San Juan.
- Port of San Juan, partially located in the barrio at Puerto Nuevo.
- San Juan Medical Center or Centro Médico de Rio Piedras.
- San Patricio State Forest, also known as the San Patricio Urban Forest, one of the 20 state forests of Puerto Rico.
- University of Puerto Rico, Medical Sciences Campus.

== Transportation ==
The area is served by the Martínez Nadal (bordering with the municipality of Guaynabo), Las Lomas, San Francisco and Centro Médico metro stations.

== Gallery ==
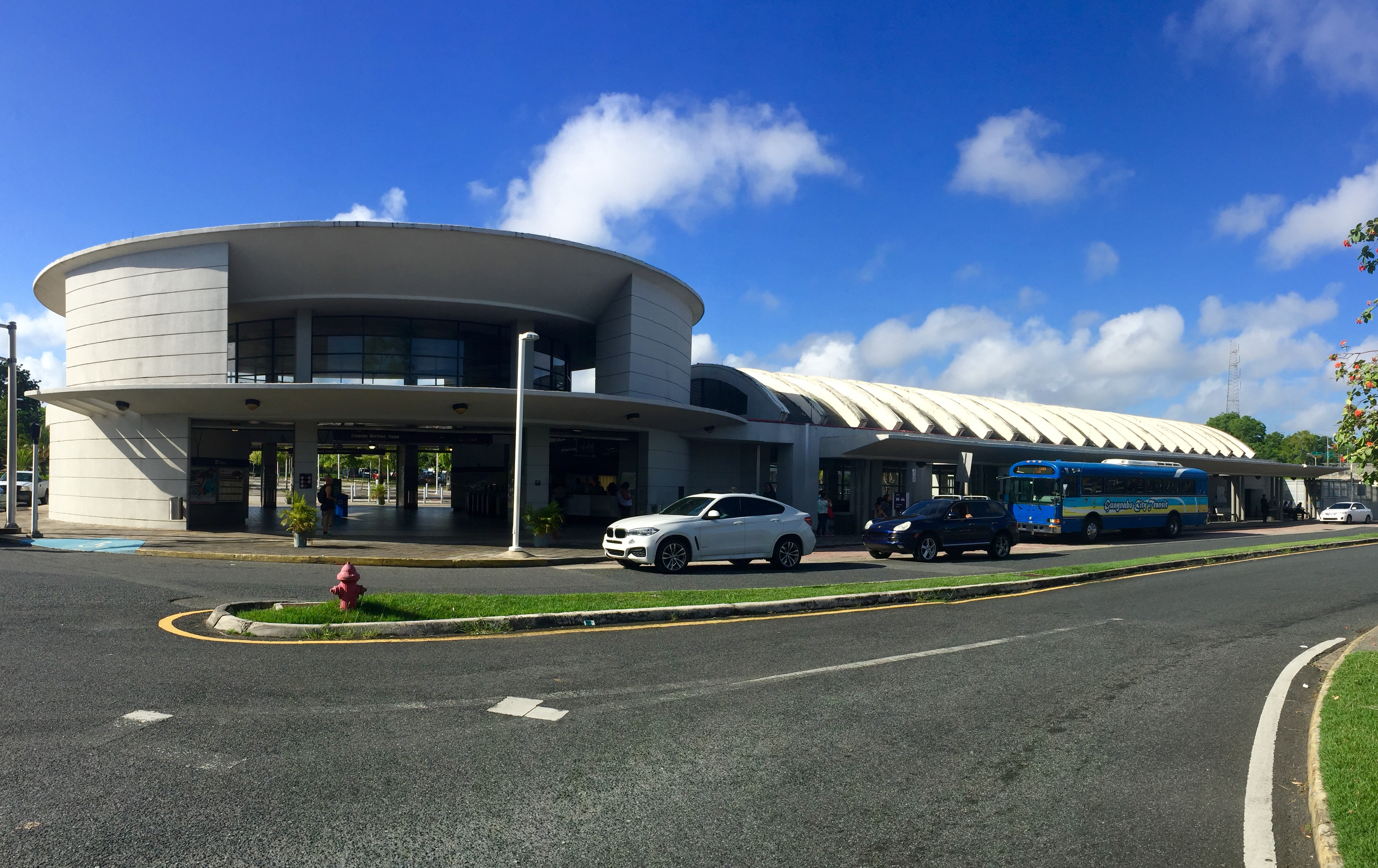
Martínez Nadal metro system station.

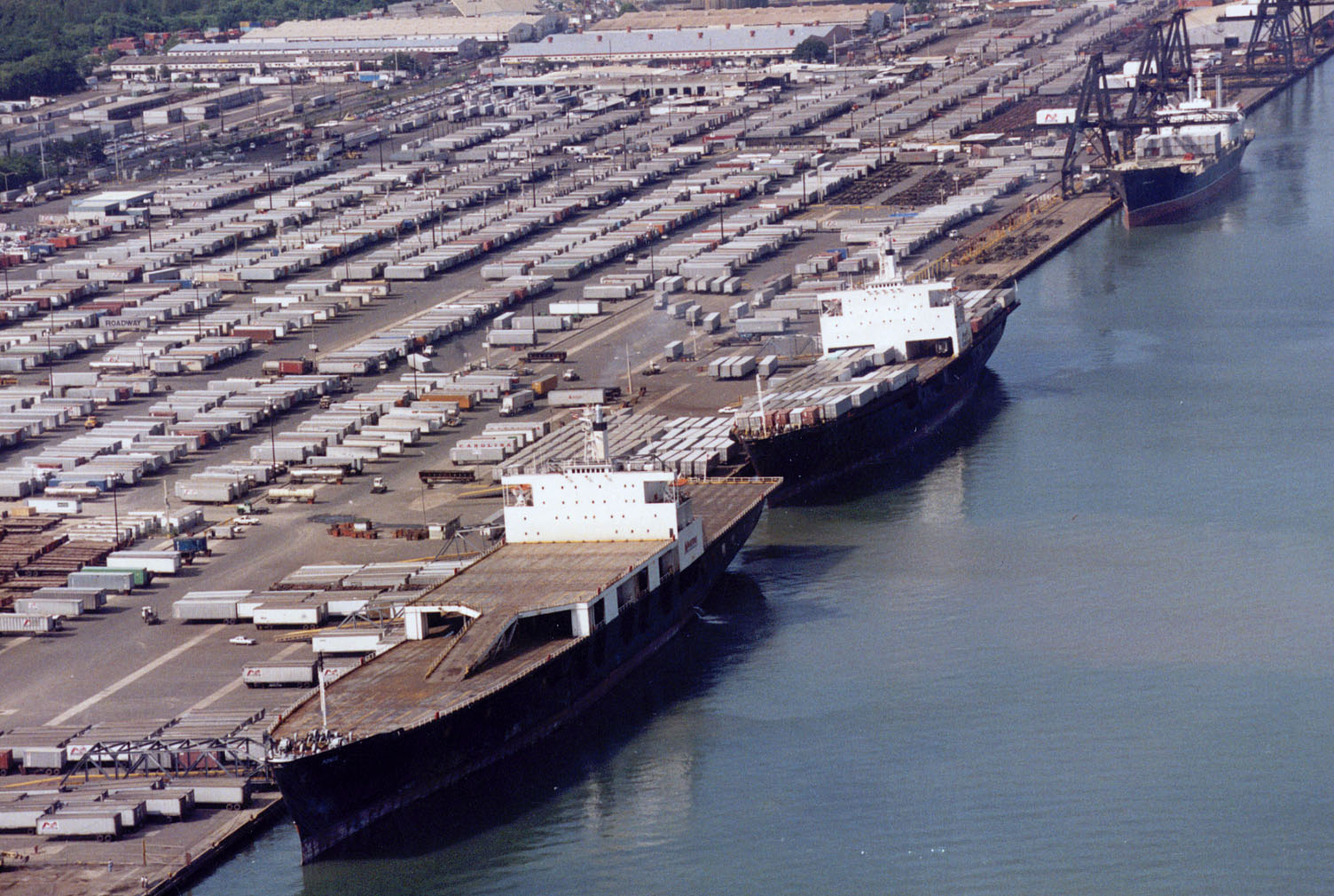
The Port of San Juan is partially located in this barrio.

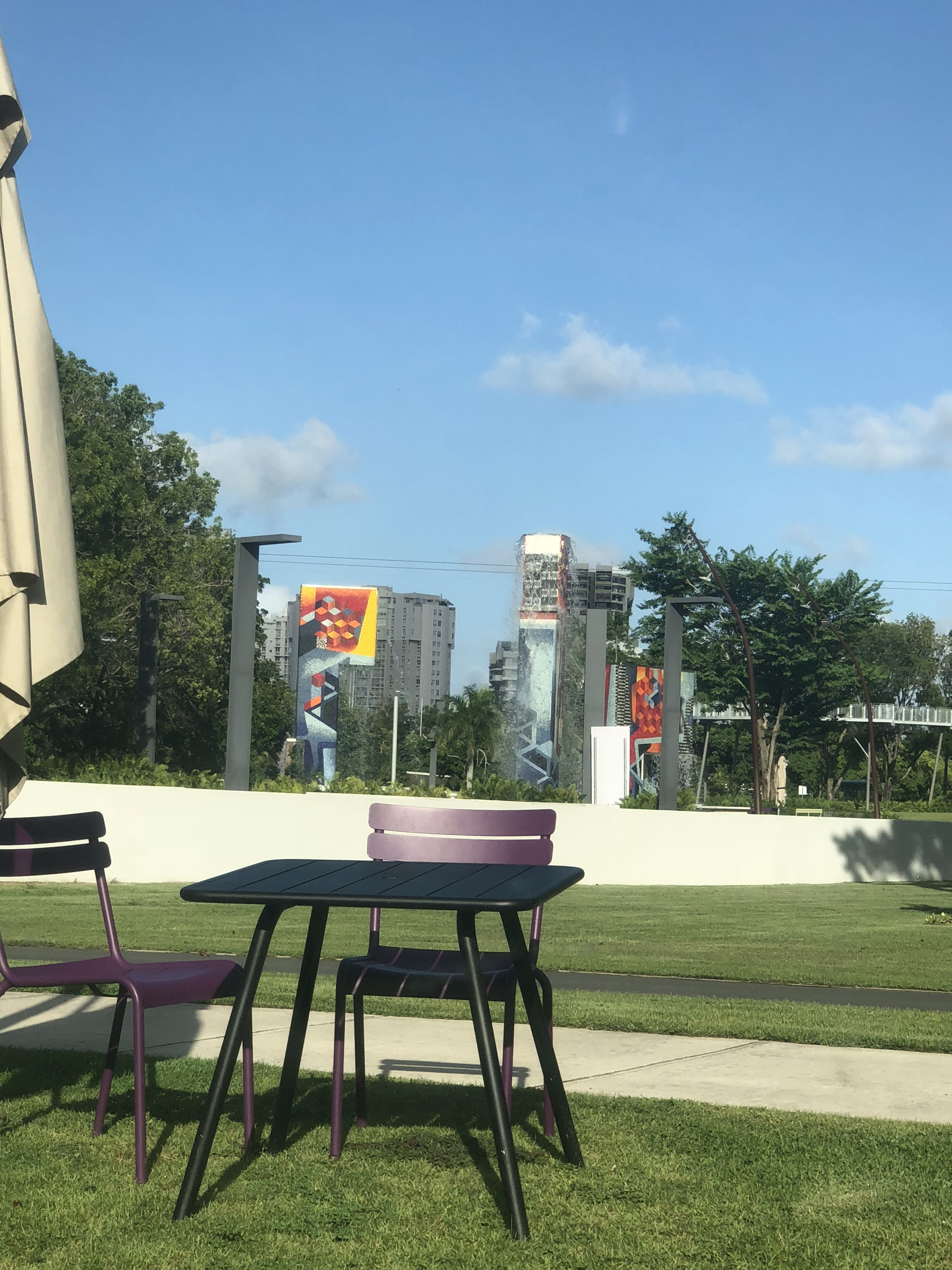
Luis Muñoz Marín Park

== See also ==
- List of communities in Puerto Rico
