= San Francisco station (Puerto Rico) =

Rail station of the Tren Urbano system in San Juan, Puerto Rico

San Francisco
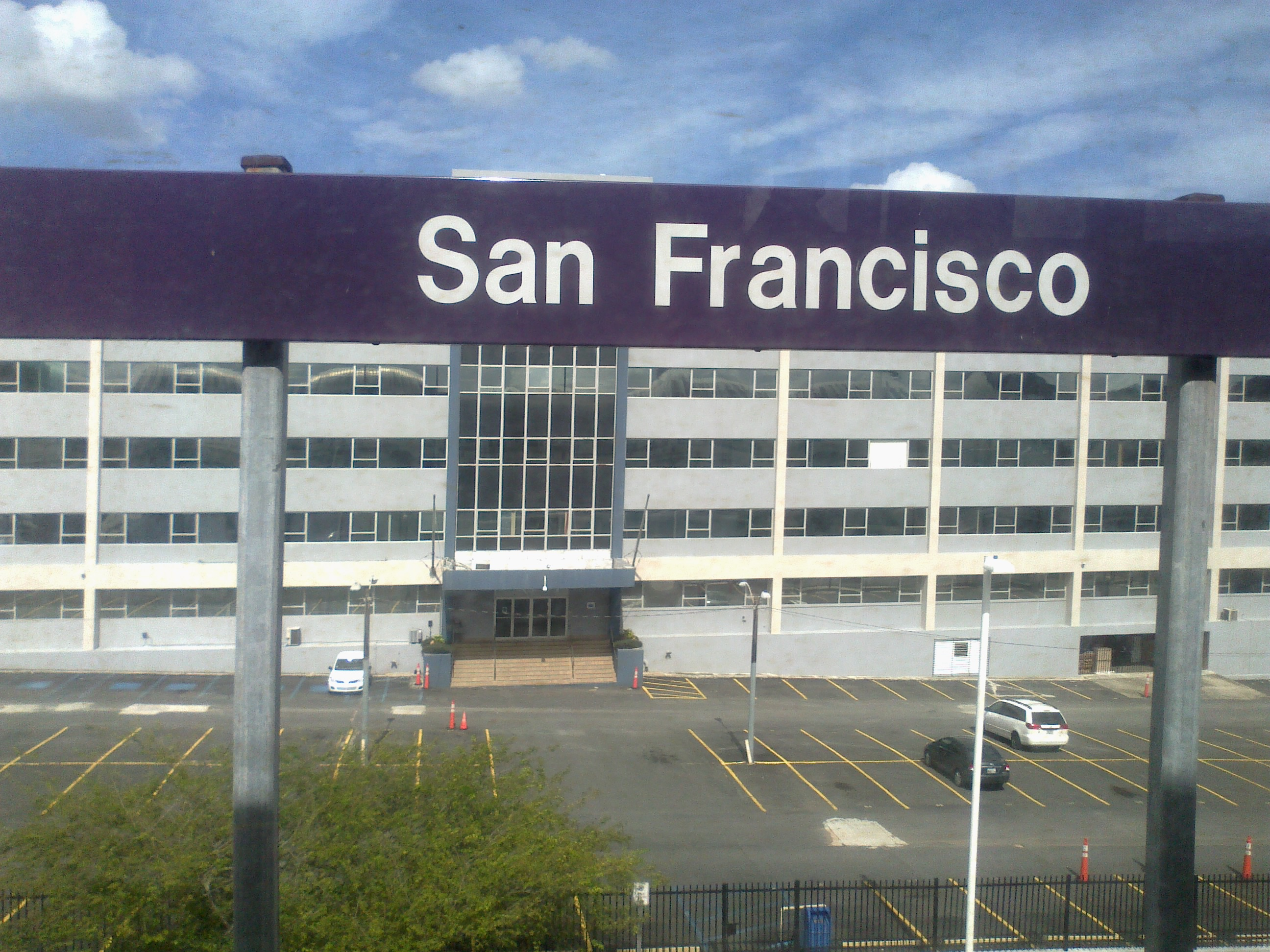
- View from the Tren Urbano San Francisco Station

General information
- Coordinates: 18°23′27″N 66°04′58″W
- Owner: Puerto Rico Department of Transportation and Public Works
- Operator: Alternate Concepts
- Platforms: 1 island platform
- Tracks: 2

Construction
- Structure type: Elevated

History
- Opened: December 17, 2004; 21 years ago

Services
Preceding station	Tren Urbano	Following station
Las Lomas toward Bayamón	Tren Urbano	Centro Médico toward Sagrado Corazón
Location

San Francisco is a rapid transit station in San Juan agglomeration, Puerto Rico. It is located between Las Lomas and Centro Médico stations on the sole line of the Tren Urbano system, in the Monacillo Urbano and Gobernador Piñero districts of the city of San Juan. The station is named after the San Francisco neighborhood located further south on José de Diego Avenue. The trial service ran in 2004, however, the regular service only started on 6 June 2005.

== Nearby ==
- Hospital de Veteranos (VA Caribbean Healthcare System Hospital)
- Caparra Terrace neighborhood
- College Park neighborhood
- San Francisco neighborhood
