= Centro Médico station (Puerto Rico) =

Rail station of the Tren Urbano system in San Juan, Puerto Rico

Centro Médico
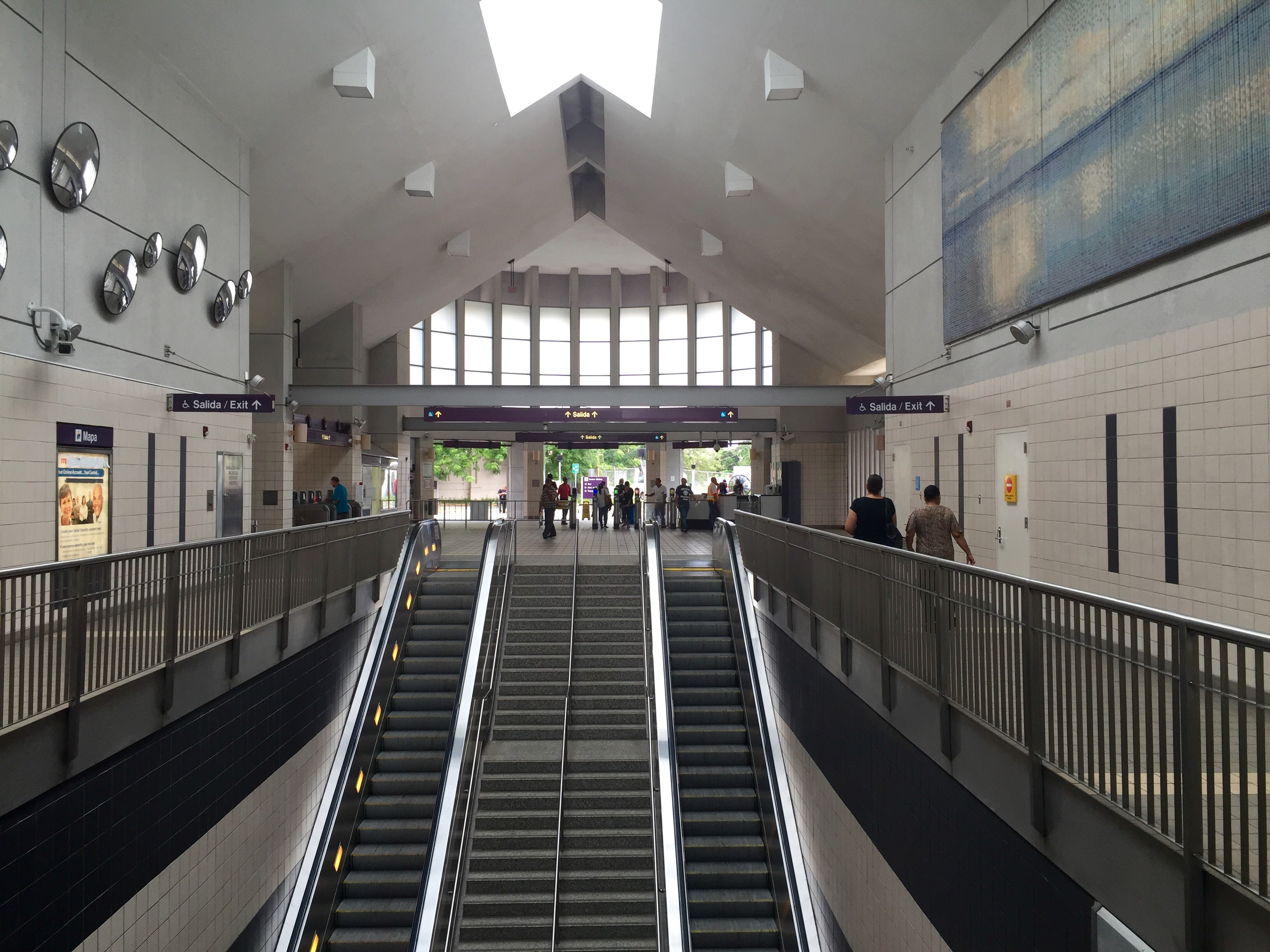
- Entrance to the station

General information
- Coordinates: 18°23′30″N 66°04′30″W
- Owner: Puerto Rico Department of Transportation and Public Works
- Operator: Alternate Concepts
- Platforms: 1 island platform
- Tracks: 2

Construction
- Structure type: Below grade

History
- Opened: December 17, 2004; 21 years ago

Services
Preceding station	Tren Urbano	Following station
San Francisco toward Bayamón	Tren Urbano	Cupey toward Sagrado Corazón
Location

The Centro Médico station is a rapid transit station in San Juan metropolitan area, Puerto Rico. It is located between San Francisco and Cupey stations on the only line of the Tren Urbano system, in the Monacillo Urbano and Gobernador Piñero districts of the city of San Juan. The station is named after the Río Piedras Medical Center (Spanish: Centro Médico de Río Piedras) located nearby. The trial service ran in 2004, however, the regular service only started on 6 June 2005.

== Bus terminal ==
The bus terminal is located at the southern entrance of the station.

- 17: Cupey TU station – Centro Médico TU station – Piñero TU station
- 18: Cupey TU station – Centro Médico TU station – Alturas de Cupey
- 19: Martínez Nadal TU station (through San Patricio, Roosevelt, de Diego and Américo Miranda avenues) – Centro Médico TU station

== Nearby ==
- Hospital de Veteranos (VA Caribbean Healthcare System Hospital)
- Río Piedras Medical Center (Centro Médico de Río Piedras)
- University of Puerto Rico, Medical Sciences Campus
- Cementerio de la Capital Memorial Park

== Gallery ==
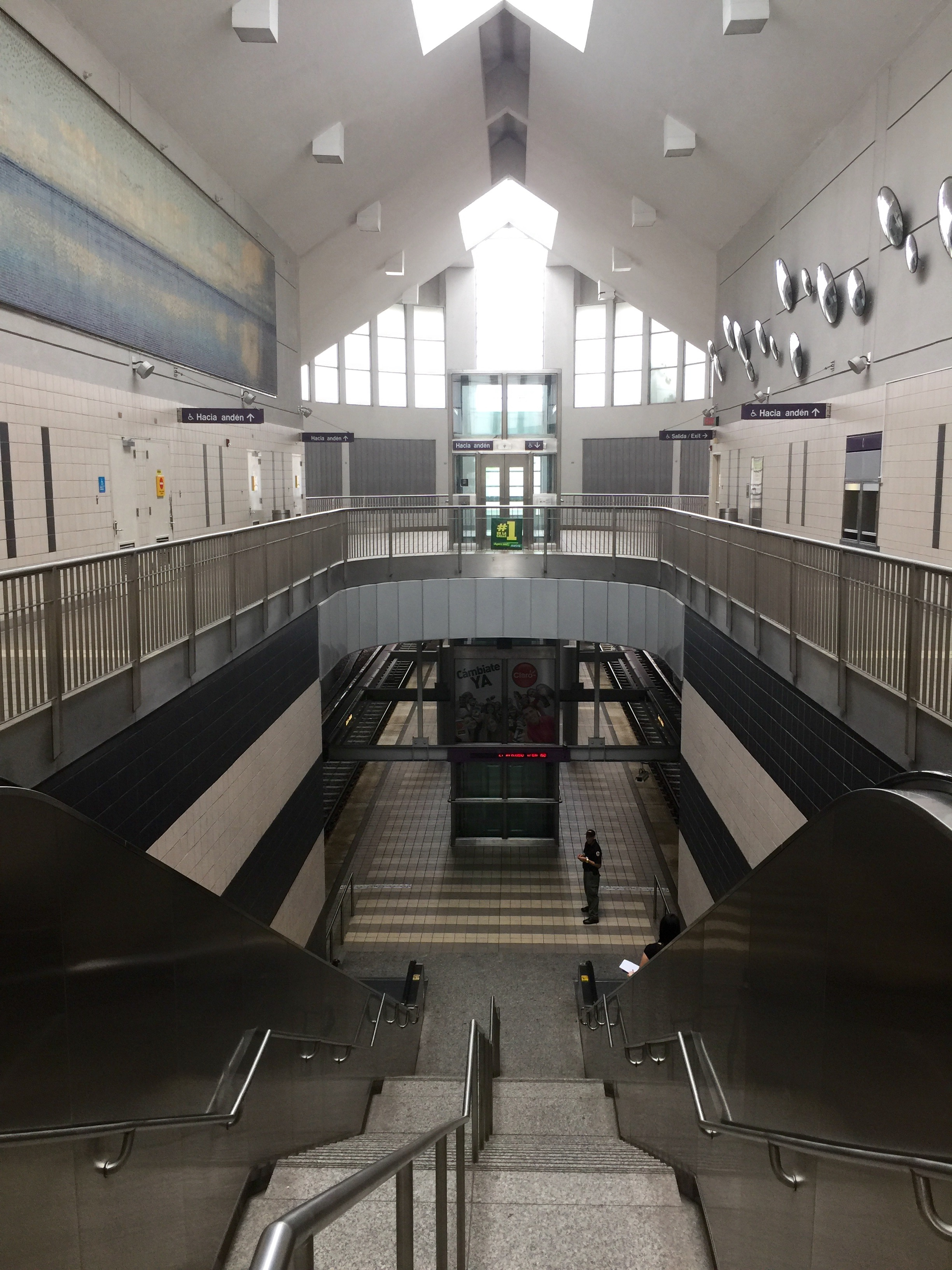
Entrance to the station

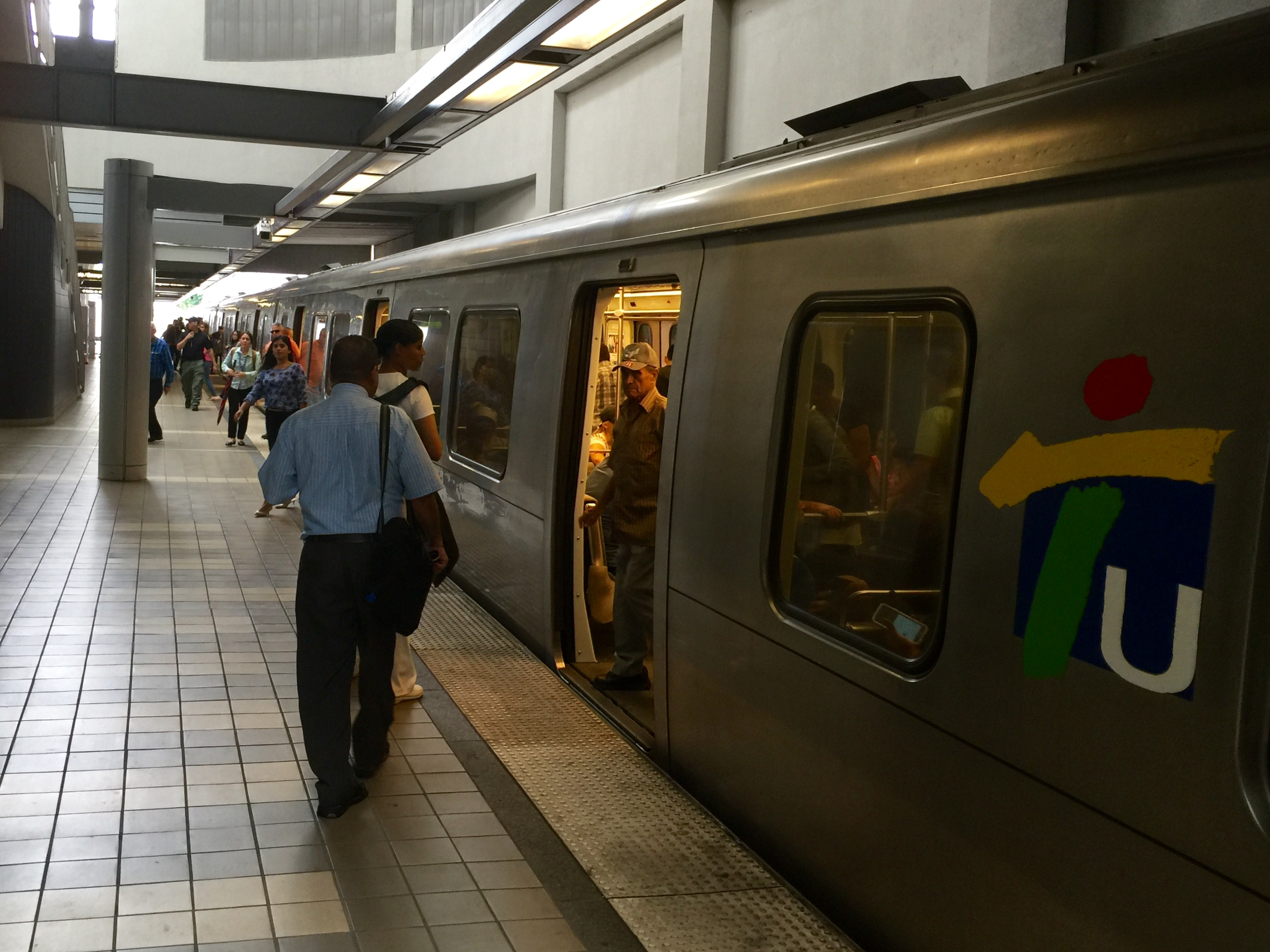
Station platform
