= Cataño Ferry =

Single route ferry service between Cataño and San Juan, Puerto Rico

Cataño Ferry route
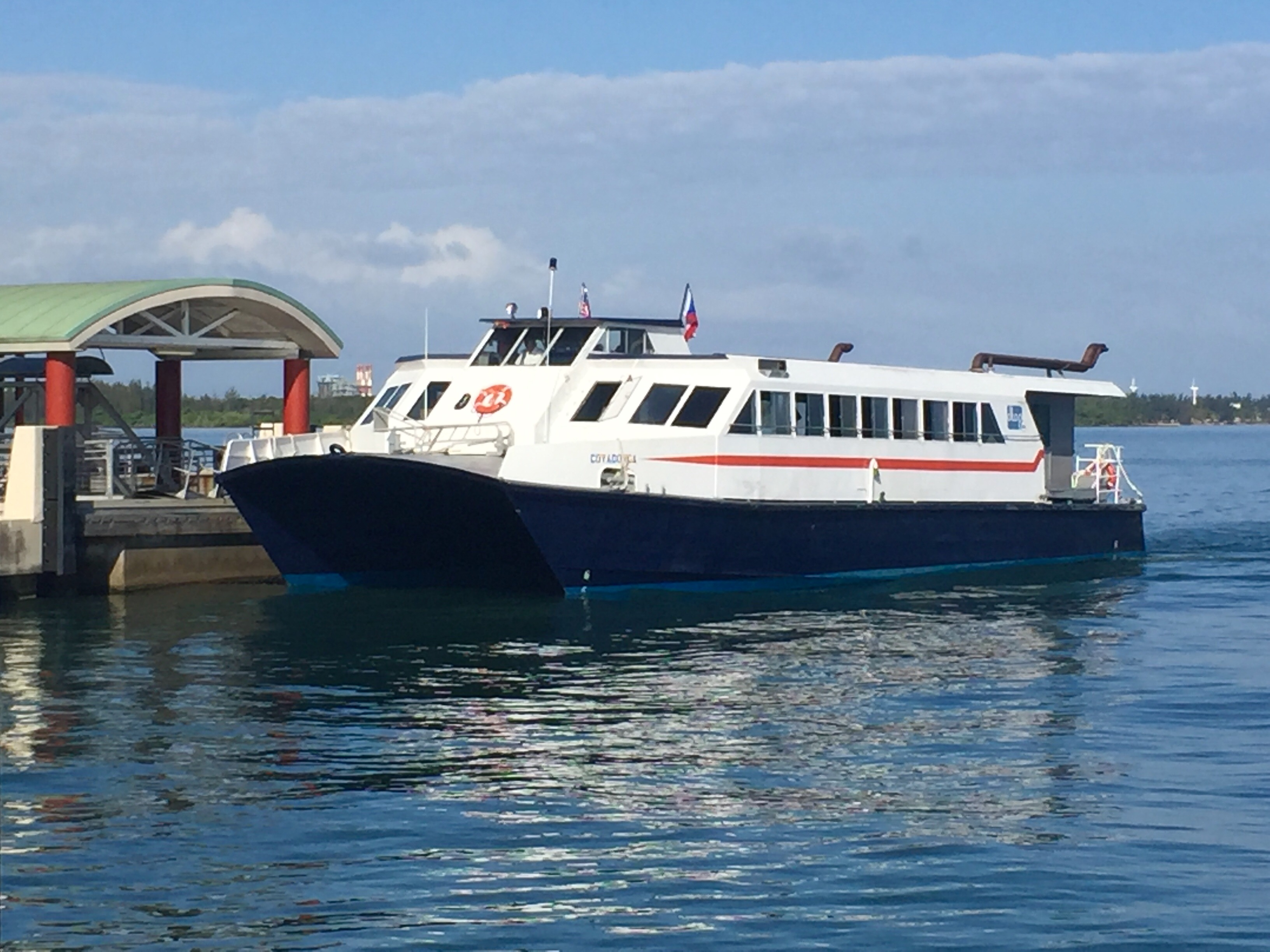
- Waterway: San Juan Bay
- Route: Cataño ⇆ Old San Juan
- Carries: passengers
- Terminals: AcuaExpreso Cataño Terminal; AcuaExpreso San Juan Terminal
- Operator: AcuaExpreso and others
- Authority: Maritime Transport Authority
- Frequency: 60 departures per day

The Cataño Ferry (Spanish: Lancha de Cataño) is a single-route ferry service between Cataño and San Juan, Puerto Rico. The ferry is an icon in Puerto Rican culture.

== History ==
The Cataño Ferry started operating in 1853, when the Cataño Steam Company used a small boat to transport cargo and passengers to San Juan. During its history, the ferry was managed by Férrea del Oeste and Compañía Popular de Transporte. According to passengers, the old boat was "a wooden boat; they called it the turtle because it was a small boat". In 1960, the Puerto Rico Ports Authority acquired the franchise, building a new terminal and buying five new ships.

The ferry covers a single route from San Juan's dock to Cataño's ferry terminal. Since most people who used the service start their trips in San Juan, it became known as "La Lancha de Cataño", because it is believed that people use the service mostly to travel from San Juan to Cataño.

Despite notable decreases in its use, the service is widely known on the island and popular with Puerto Ricans and tourists. Since the services are carried out from Old San Juan to Cataño and vice versa, their relative closeness to San Juan hotels makes the service approachable to tourists. It is also popular with Puerto Rican and American soldiers who are based at nearby Fort Buchanan.

During the 1960s, service on La lancha cost only five cents one way. The ticket prices began to rise; however, by the 1980s, they cost ¢25, and they later rose to ¢50 as of July 2024.

On January 1, 2000, the Puerto Rican Government passed ownership of all legal passenger ship services to the Puerto Rican Maritime Transport Authority. While this was made mostly to enhance service between Culebra, Fajardo and Vieques, the deal also included the "Lancha de Cataño" service.

In 2004, slightly more than 1.1 million passengers were transported by the ferry service.

== Operations ==
Although the service is heavily used by tourists, its primary purpose is to serve as a transportation hub for those who live nearby Cataño but work in San Juan to complement the AcuaExpreso. The ferry crosses the San Juan Bay, with its services running from mornings to evenings seven days a week as the weather and maritime conditions permit. At its route's southwestern end is the AcuaExpreso Cataño Terminal in Cataño, while at its northwestern end is the AcuaExpreso San Juan Terminal, located at Pier 2 of the San Juan Port in Old San Juan.

The ferry is operated by ships with two levels for passengers. Round-trip services leave both Catano and San Juan's terminals every 15 minutes. The "Lancha de Catano" may take passengers on a trip around the El Morro Castle before arriving at its actual destination.

== See also ==
- Culebra Ferry
- Vieques Ferry
