= Las Lomas station =

Rail station of the Tren Urbano system in San Juan, Puerto Rico

Las Lomas

General information
- Coordinates: 18°23′27″N 66°05′40″W
- Owner: Puerto Rico Department of Transportation and Public Works
- Operator: Alternate Concepts
- Platforms: 2 side platforms
- Tracks: 2

Construction
- Structure type: Elevated

History
- Opened: December 17, 2004; 21 years ago

Services
Preceding station	Tren Urbano	Following station
Martínez Nadal toward Bayamón	Tren Urbano	San Francisco toward Sagrado Corazón
Location

Las Lomas is a rapid transit station in San Juan agglomeration, Puerto Rico. It is located between Martínez Nadal and San Francisco stations on the sole line of the Tren Urbano system, in the Monacillo Urbano district of the city of San Juan. The station is named after Las Lomas neighborhood which it serves. The trial service ran in 2004, however, the regular service only started on 6 June 2005.

== Nearby ==
- Altamesa neighborhood
- Las Lomas neighborhood
- Hospital Metropolitano de San Juan
