= Puerto Rico Maritime Transport Authority =

Government-owned corporation of Puerto Rico

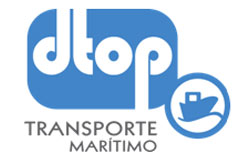

Agency overview
- Formed: January 1, 2000; 26 years ago
- Preceding agency: Puerto Rico Ports Authority
- Jurisdiction: Executive branch
- Headquarters: Fajardo, Puerto Rico
- Agency executive: Carlos D. Pérez Medina, Executive director
- Parent department: Department of Transportation and Public Works
- Key document: 1 (PDF). January 1, 2000.
- Website: www.atm.gobierno.pr

The Puerto Rico Maritime Transport Authority —Spanish: Autoridad de Transporte Marítimo (ATM)— is a government-owned corporation of Puerto Rico charged with providing maritime transportation services for cargo and passengers within Puerto Rico, including the island municipalities of Vieques and Culebra. The agency is ascribed to the Department of Transportation and Public Works and was established by 1 (PDF). January 1, 2000..

== Services ==
The agency oversees three major services for maritime transportation within the Commonwealth of Puerto Rico. These include:

Name	Routes	Quays
AcuaExpreso	Cataño ⇆ Old San Juan; Old San Juan ⇆ Hato Rey	AcuaExpreso Cataño Terminal in Cataño; AcuaExpreso San Juan Terminal within Pier 2 of the Port of San Juan in Old San Juan; AcuaExpreso Hato Rey Terminal in Hato Rey nearby the Coliseum of Puerto Rico
Culebra Ferry	Fajardo ⇆ Culebra	
Vieques Ferry	Fajardo ⇆ Vieques	

== Executive director ==
2009–present: Carlos D. Pérez Medina
