= Vieques Ferry =

Single route ferry service between Fajardo and Vieques, Puerto Rico

- Route: Fajardo ⇆ Vieques, Puerto Rico
- Carries: passengers and cargo
- Authority: Maritime Transport Authority

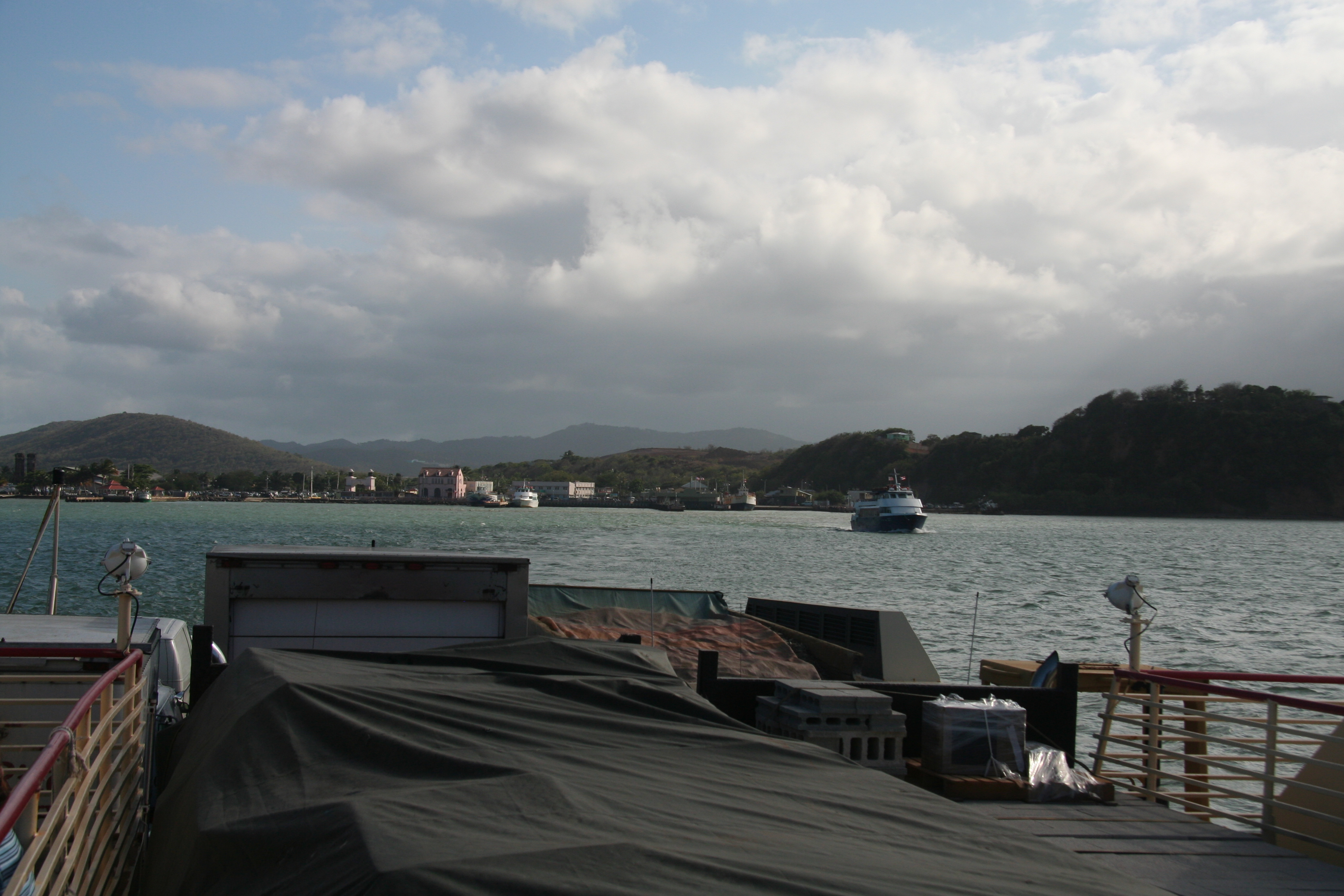
Ferry trip from Fajardo to Vieques, Puerto Rico

The Vieques Ferry or Lancha de Vieques, is a ferry system that carries passengers and cargo from Ceiba, Puerto Rico to Vieques, Puerto Rico and vice versa, both complementing and competing with commercial air service available from San Juan, Puerto Rico to the island of Vieques.

A typical ticket from Ceiba to Vieques (or from Vieques to Fajardo) costs US$2 one-way and US$4 round-trip.

The Vieques Ferry system runs services from and to Ceiba each day of the week for passengers, and from Mondays to Fridays for cargo-only travel. There is a similar ferry service from Ceiba to Culebra, an island located slightly northwest of Vieques. That service is named Culebra Ferry, or Lancha de Culebra.

== History ==
On January 1, 2000, the Puerto Rican Government passed ownership of all legal passenger ship services to the Puerto Rican Maritime Transport Authority. This was made mostly to enhance service between Culebra, Fajardo and Vieques.

On October 16, 2013, Ceiba mayor Angelo Cruz Ramos requested that the Fajardo-Vieques ferry service go from Ceiba to Vieques instead, alleging that it would only take 25 minutes to get from Ceiba to Vieques and vice versa by boat, cutting the travel time between Vieques and mainland Puerto Rico by more than one hour. The stop was later moved to Ceiba.

On November 8, 2013, the American Civil Liberties Union made allegations that diabetic people were not being allowed to eat inside the ferries during the trips between Fajardo and Vieques. On January 16, 2014, 10 passengers interrupted a trip from Fajardo to Vieques because they thought the boat named Cayo Largo, was leaving for Culebra instead of Vieques. Police intervened and the boat was able to leave two hours later.

On September 19, 2023, it was announced that the Puerto Rican government had signed contracts worth $70 million with the Conrad Shipyards company to build new ships for the services to Vieques and to Culebra.

== See also ==
- Catano Ferry
- Culebra Ferry
