= Culebra Ferry =

Ferry service between Culebra and Fajardo, Puerto Rico

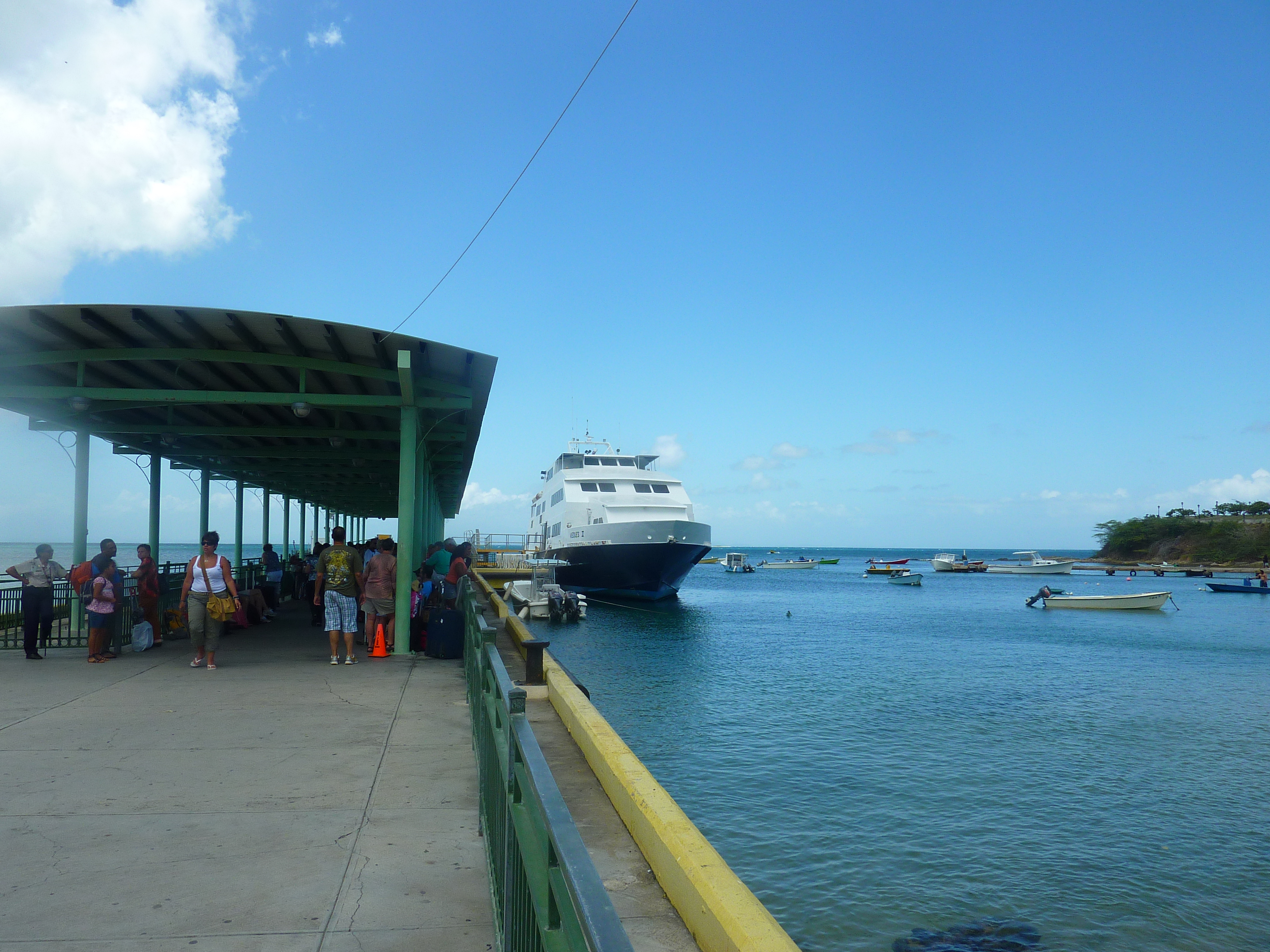
Ferry in Culebra

The Culebra Ferry, or Lancha de Culebra, also referred to by locals simply as La Lancha, is a ferry service that links the cities of Culebra and Ceiba, Puerto Rico. It is used by Culebra locals and tourists, both for work and vacation-related trips.

== History ==
On January 1, 2000, the Puerto Rican Government passed ownership of all legal passenger ship services to the Puerto Rico Maritime Transport Authority. This was made mostly to enhance service between Culebra, Fajardo and Vieques.

On September 19, 2023, it was announced that the Puerto Rican government had signed contracts worth $70 million dollars with the Conrad Shipyards company to build new ships for the services to Culebra and to Vieques.

== See also ==
- Catano Ferry
- Vieques Ferry
