= AcuaExpreso =

Ferry service between Cataño and San Juan, Puerto Rico

- Waterway: San Juan Bay
- Route: Cataño ⇆ Old San Juan; Old San Juan ⇆ Hato Rey (discontinued)
- Carries: passengers
- Terminals: AcuaExpreso Cataño Terminal; AcuaExpreso San Juan Terminal; AcuaExpreso Hato Rey Terminal
- Authority: Maritime Transport Authority
- Travel time: 7–18 minutes
- Frequency: 60 departures per day
- Daily ridership: 1,000–4,000 passengers per day
- Yearly ridership: about 1 million passengers per year
- Website: ati.pr

AcuaExpreso (Spanish: AquaExpress) is a ferry service between the municipalities of Cataño and San Juan across San Juan Bay in northeastern Puerto Rico. It consists of one route connecting Cataño and the Old San Juan historic quarter in San Juan Islet via the Cataño Ferry, which docks at the AcuaExpreso Cataño Terminal in Cataño on the southwestern side of San Juan Bay and at the AcuaExpreso San Juan Terminal in Pier 2 of the San Juan Cruise Port in Old San Juan on the northeastern side of the Bay.

The ferry crosses San Juan Bay, with its services running from mornings to evenings seven days a week as the weather and maritime conditions permit. Although the service is heavily used by tourists, its primary purpose is to serve as a transportation hub for those who live nearby Cataño but work in San Juan.

It formerly included the Old San Juan to Hato Rey service, which used to dock at AcuaExpreso San Juan Terminal in Pier 2 of the San Juan Cruise Port on the northwestern side of the Bay and at the AcuaExpreso Hato Rey Terminal in Hato Rey on the southeastern side of the Bay through the Martín Peña Channel, ending in front of the Coliseum of Puerto Rico and next to the Hato Rey station of the Tren Urbano metro system.
