= Martínez Nadal station =

Rail station of the Tren Urbano system in San Juan, Puerto Rico

Martínez Nadal
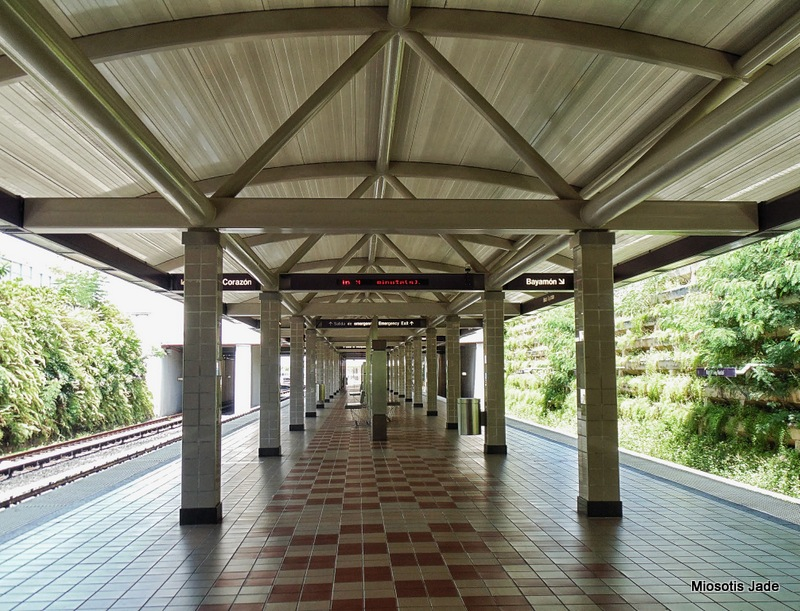

General information
- Coordinates: 18°23′28″N 66°06′06″W
- Owner: Puerto Rico Department of Transportation and Public Works
- Operator: Alternate Concepts
- Platforms: 1 island platform
- Tracks: 3 (1 used for access to depot)

Construction
- Structure type: At grade

History
- Opened: December 17, 2004; 21 years ago

Services
| Preceding station | Tren Urbano | Following station |
|---|---|---|
| Torrimar toward Bayamón | Tren Urbano | Las Lomas toward Sagrado Corazón |
Location

Martínez Nadal is a rapid transit station in San Juan agglomeration, Puerto Rico. It is located between Torrimar and Las Lomas stations on the sole line of the Tren Urbano system, in the Monacillo Urbano district of the city of San Juan close to the municipal border with Guaynabo. The station is named after the PR-20 highway located nearby, itself named after politician Rafael Martínez Nadal. The trial service ran in 2004, however, the regular service only started on 6 June 2005.

== Bus terminal ==
The bus terminals are located immediately north and south of the main entrance lobby of the station.

- 8: Piñero TU station (through Jesús T. Piñero Ave) – Martínez Nadal TU station
- 19: Martínez Nadal TU station (through San Patricio, Roosevelt, de Diego and Américo Miranda avenues) – Centro Médico TU station
- 27: Martínez Nadal TU station – Guaynabo Pueblo (downtown)

In addition to AMA services, the bus terminal also has connections to municipal buses and local carros públicos.

== Nearby ==
- Altamira neighborhood
- San Patricio Plaza (further north on PR-20)
