= Port of San Juan =

Seaport facility in Puerto Rico

- Port of San Juan in and around San Juan Bay, 2017 Satellite view of Port of San Juan in and around San Juan Bay, 2016
- Interactive map of Port of San Juan

Location
- Country: United States
- Location: Puerto Rico
- Coordinates: 18.4430174°N 66.1001863°W
- UN/LOCODE: PRSJU

Details
- Type of Harbor: Semi-enclosed bay

The Port of San Juan (Spanish: Puerto de San Juan), also known as San Juan Harbor, is the largest and main seaport facility in Puerto Rico, located in and around San Juan Bay in the northeastern Atlantic coast of the archipelago and island. Surrounded by the metropolitan area of San Juan, the capital city and municipality, within 5 mi (8 km) from the Old San Juan historic quarter, Condado and Isla Verde resort areas, Hato Rey business center, and SJU airport, the port accommodates cargo, cruise, ferry, marina, and U.S. Coast Guard facilities. It largely operates through public-private partnerships, as determined by its owner, the Puerto Rico Ports Authority (PRPA).

U.S. Army Corps of Engineers navigational configuration of the Port of San Juan, 2018

== History ==
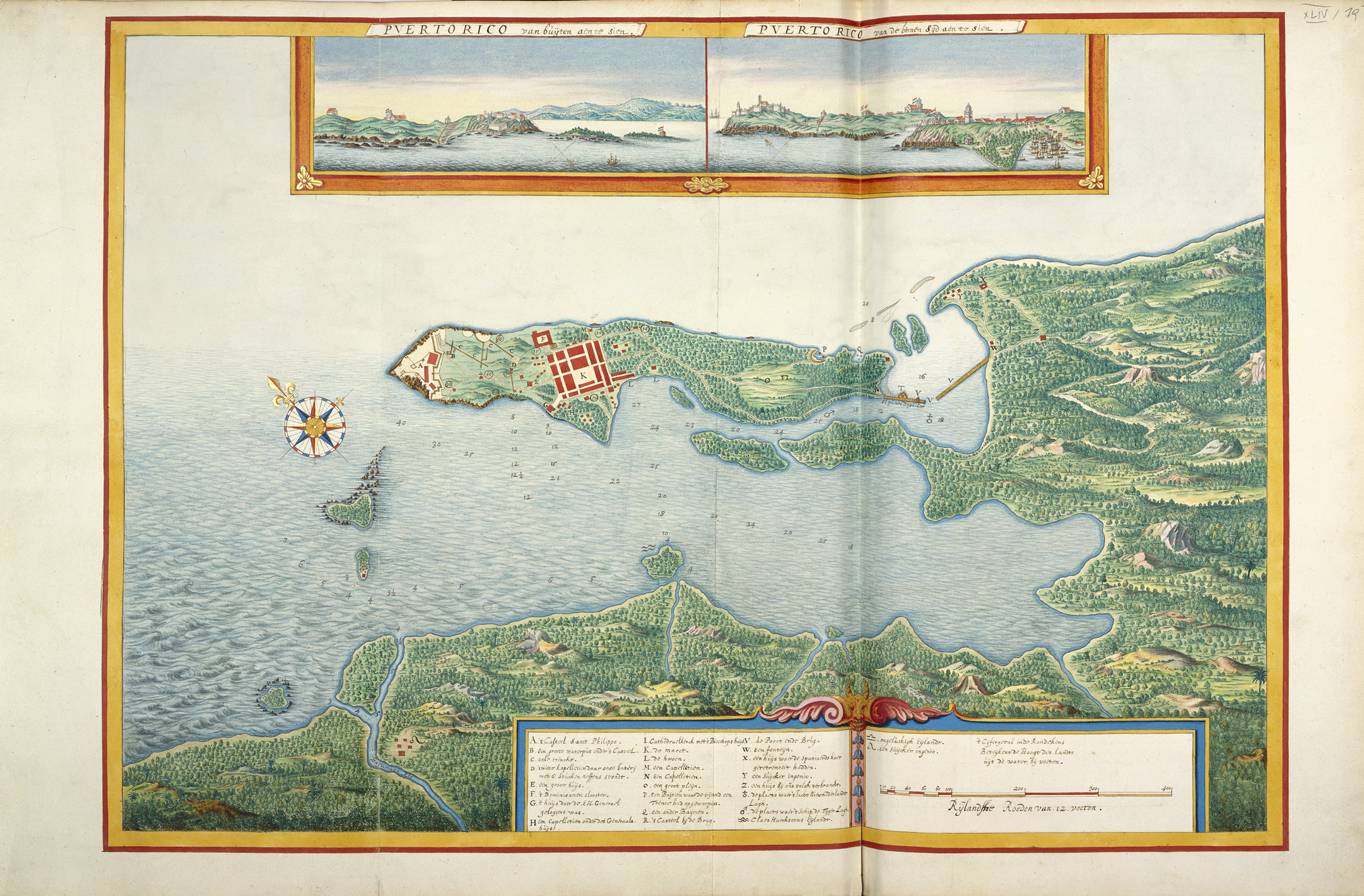
Map of San Juan Bay, c. 1660

The Port of San Juan is located in and around San Juan Bay, a deep semi-enclosed bay, estuary, and harbor connected to the North Atlantic Ocean in the northeastern coastal plain of the main island of Puerto Rico. Named after John the Baptist, whose name explorer Christopher Columbus gave to the main island of Puerto Rico as San Juan Bautista (Saint John Baptist) upon its discovery during his second vovage in 1493, San Juan Bay was first discovered and explored by Spanish conquistador Juan Ponce de León, who began the European colonization of the archipelago along its shorelines.

In 1508, Ponce de León established the capital city of Caparra, also called Puerto Rico ("Rich Port"), in the southwestern side of the bay, currently part of the Pueblo Viejo barrio of the Guaynabo municipality. In 1521, the city was transferred to San Juan Islet in the northern side of the bay under the name of San Juan Bautista de Puerto Rico ("Saint John Baptist of Rich Port"), today the Old San Juan historic quarter in the San Juan capital municipality.

Map of San Juan Bay, 1874

The Port of San Juan became a cornerstone of the Spanish Empire in the New World, as it was the closest European-controlled major port in the Americas to both continental Europe and Africa with open access to the Atlantic Ocean. The northeast trade winds, coupled with the Canary, North Equatorial, and Antilles ocean currents, naturally made the port the first main location to encounter en route to the Caribbean, North America, Central America, and South America. As such, it served as a critical point for the transatlantic transportation of wealth from the Americas to Europe during the Age of Exploration and Sail.

The strategic location of the Port of San Juan made it a prime target for competing European world powers, including England in 1595 and 1598, the Dutch Republic in 1625, and Great Britain in 1797, and pirates. To protect the port, the Spanish invested heavily in its fortification. The construction of El Morro, San Cristóbal, La Fortaleza, El Cañuelo, San Gerónimo, San Antonio, and other forts part of the Walls of Old San Juan transformed the port into one of most heavily fortified in the Americas, alongside Havana and Cartagena, which were the other two locations that served as critical hubs for the transatlantic transportation of wealth from the Americas to Europe.

San Juan Bay from the Old San Juan quarter, 1919 (top) and 1927 (bottom)

In 1898, the United States took control of the Port of San Juan following the annexation of Puerto Rico as U.S. unincorporated territory during the Spanish-American War. The geostrategic location of the port was paramount in the construction of the Panama Canal, and the defense of the Western Hemisphere against Nazi Operation Neuland in the Battle of the Caribbean during WWII. Like Pearl Harbor, Hawaii in the middle of the Pacific Ocean, the Port of San Juan, Puerto Rico in the middle of the Atlantic Ocean plays an important part for the continuation of American power abroad.

== Cruise port ==
Cruise sailing past western Old San Juan quarter, 2024

The San Juan Cruise Port comprises the cruise terminals of the Port of San Juan in San Juan, the capital city and municipality of Puerto Rico. Largely situated in the original harbor of the capital city under the Spanish Empire during the Age of Discovery and Sail, it is located in and around San Antonio Channel, a narrow inlet in the northwest of San Juan Bay, bordered by the Old San Juan historic quarter in San Juan Islet to the north, the Guillermo Esteves Bridge to the east, and the Puerto Rico Convention Center and Fernando Luis Ribas Dominicci Airport in the Isla Grande district of Santurce barrio to the south. It is owned by the Puerto Rico Ports Authority and managed by Global Ports Holding under a public–private partnership lasting for 30 years, beginning in 2024.

Cruises moored at San Juan Cruise Port in the Old San Juan quarter, 2026

The San Juan Cruise Port consists of two districts, namely the Old San Juan District and the Homeport District. The Old San Juan District is based on three terminals situated in the Old San Juan quarter at the mouth of the San Antonio Channel. Operating as a call port, these handle transit calls and luxury ships. The Homeport District is based on five terminals situated on both sides of the center of San Antonio Channel. Operating as a homeport, these handle the start and end of a cruise voyages, including passenger changes and resupplies. Both districts combined are able to accommodate the largest in-service cruise ships today, including the Icon-class. The port is the busiest in the Greater and Lesser Antilles by total passengers.

District	Location	Use	Image			Berth			Status	Operator
District	Location	Use	Image	Name	Type	Side	Space	Draft	Status	Operator
Old San Juan District	Old San Juan in San Juan Islet, San Juan	Call port		Pier 1	Pier	East	770 ft (each)	35 ft	Closed and under redevelopment	Global Ports Holding
Old San Juan District	Old San Juan in San Juan Islet, San Juan	Call port		Pier 1	Pier	West	770 ft (each)	35 ft	Closed and under redevelopment	Global Ports Holding
Old San Juan District	Old San Juan in San Juan Islet, San Juan	Call port		Pier 3	Pier	East	1,484 ft (each)	36 ft	Open	Global Ports Holding
Old San Juan District	Old San Juan in San Juan Islet, San Juan	Call port		Pier 3	Pier	West	1,484 ft (each)	36 ft	Open	Global Ports Holding
Old San Juan District	Old San Juan in San Juan Islet, San Juan	Call port		Pier 4	Pier	East	1,120 ft (each)	37 ft	Open	Global Ports Holding
Old San Juan District	Old San Juan in San Juan Islet, San Juan	Call port		Pier 4	Pier	West	1,120 ft (each)	36 ft	Open	Global Ports Holding
Homeport District	Puerta de Tierra in San Juan Islet, San Juan	Homeport		Pier 11	Wharf	580 ft		36 ft	Closed and under redevelopment	Global Ports Holding
Homeport District	Puerta de Tierra in San Juan Islet, San Juan	Homeport		Pier 12	Wharf	555 ft		36 ft	Closed and under redevelopment	Global Ports Holding
Homeport District	Puerta de Tierra in San Juan Islet, San Juan	Homeport		Pier 13	Wharf	555 ft		36 ft	Closed indefinitely	Global Ports Holding
Homeport District	Isla Grande in Santurce, San Juan	Homeport		Panamerican I	Wharf	2,200 ft (combined)		36 ft	Open	Global Ports Holding
Homeport District	Isla Grande in Santurce, San Juan	Homeport		Panamerican II	Wharf	2,200 ft (combined)		36 ft	Open	Global Ports Holding

== Cargo port ==
A cargo ship entering the Port of San Juan next to El Morro fortress, 2013

Largely constructed during the 1940s and 1950s, the cargo facilities of the Port of San Juan include numerous piers and/or wharfs located on the northern, eastern, southern, and western shorelines of San Juan Bay. These are broadly categorized into four zones, namely Puerta de Tierra, Isla Grande, Puerto Nuevo, and Pueblo Viejo. Puerta de Tierra has three cargo terminals within the San Antonio Channel in the northern part of the bay in San Juan Islet. Isla Grande also has three cargo terminals, one within San Antonio Channel, one in the western side of Isla Grande, and one in its southern side, which are all part of the Santurce barrio of San Juan. Puerto Nuevo has 14 terminals, covering most of the southern shoreline of the bay within the Hato Rey and Gobernador Piñero barrios of San Juan. Pueblo Viejo has three terminals in the southwestern corner of the bay in the Pueblo Viejo barrio of Guaynabo.

Receiving about 80% of all imports into Puerto Rico, these handle containerized and break-bulk cargoes with and without shore-side cranes as well as roll on/roll off and barge service. Major commodities handled include manufactured products, cement, fuel oil, gasoline, natural gas, wheeled vehicles, and foodstuffs.

District	Location	Use	Terminal			Berth			Status	Operator
District	Location	Use	Image	Name	Type	Side	Space	Draft	Status	Operator
Port Zone of Puerta de Tierra	Puerta de Tierra in San Juan Islet, San Juan	Bulk and containerized freight from the Lesser Antilles on Offshore Supply Vessels		Pier 10	Wharf	South	~365 ft	25 ft	Open	Puerto Rico Ports Authority
Port Zone of Puerta de Tierra	Puerta de Tierra in San Juan Islet, San Juan	Bulk and containerized freight from the Lesser Antilles on Offshore Supply Vessels		Pier 14	Wharf	446 ft		35 ft	Open	Puerto Rico Ports Authority
Port Zone of Puerta de Tierra	Puerta de Tierra in San Juan Islet, San Juan	Multi-use, including cruises (call port), yachts (marina), and freight (roll-on/roll-off)		Navy Frontier Pier	Wharf	1,140 ft		30 ft	Closed and under plans of redevelopment	Puerto Rico Convention Center District Authority
Port Zone of Isla Grande	Isla Grande in Santurce, San Juan	Cement material on cement carriers		Argos	Wharf	~800 ft		30 ft	Open	Argos Puerto Rico
Port Zone of Isla Grande	Isla Grande in Santurce, San Juan	Roll-on/roll-off and containerized freight on cargo ships		Crowley	Wharf	900 ft		40 ft	Open	Crowley
Port Zone of Isla Grande	Isla Grande in Santurce, San Juan	Roll-on/roll-off and containerized freight on cargo ships		Pier 15	Pier 1 (Tender pier)	North	~450 ft	25 ft	Open	Puerto Rico Ports Authority
Port Zone of Isla Grande	Isla Grande in Santurce, San Juan	Roll-on/roll-off and containerized freight on cargo ships		Pier 15	Pier 1 (Tender pier)	South	~940 ft	25 ft	Open	Puerto Rico Ports Authority
Port Zone of Isla Grande	Isla Grande in Santurce, San Juan	Roll-on/roll-off and containerized freight on cargo ships		Pier 15	Pier 2 (Outfitting pier)	North	~610 ft	25 ft	Open	Puerto Rico Ports Authority
Port Zone of Isla Grande	Isla Grande in Santurce, San Juan	Roll-on/roll-off and containerized freight on cargo ships		Pier 15	Pier 2 (Outfitting pier)	South	~915 ft	25 ft	Open	Puerto Rico Ports Authority
Port Zone of Isla Grande	Isla Grande in Santurce, San Juan	Roll-on/roll-off and containerized freight on cargo ships		Pier 15	Dock B (Wharf)	~160 ft		25 ft	Open	Puerto Rico Ports Authority
Port Zone of Puerto Nuevo	Hato Rey and Gobernador Piñero in San Juan	Roll-on/roll-off and containerized freight on cargo ships		Pier O	Wharf	~660		39 ft	Open and under plans of redevelopment	Puerto Rico Ports Authority
Port Zone of Puerto Nuevo	Hato Rey and Gobernador Piñero in San Juan	Roll-on/roll-off and containerized freight on cargo ships		Pier N	Wharf	~660		39 ft	Open and under plans of redevelopment	Puerto Rico Ports Authority
Port Zone of Puerto Nuevo	Hato Rey and Gobernador Piñero in San Juan	Containerized freight on cargo ships		Pier M	Wharf	~660		39 ft	Open	Puerto Rico Terminals
Port Zone of Puerto Nuevo	Hato Rey and Gobernador Piñero in San Juan	Containerized freight on cargo ships		Pier L	Wharf	~660		39 ft	Open	Puerto Rico Terminals
Port Zone of Puerto Nuevo	Hato Rey and Gobernador Piñero in San Juan	Containerized freight on cargo ships		Pier K	Wharf	~660		39 ft	Open	Puerto Rico Terminals
Port Zone of Puerto Nuevo	Hato Rey and Gobernador Piñero in San Juan	Containerized freight on cargo ships		Pier J	Wharf	~660		39 ft	Open	Puerto Rico Terminals
Port Zone of Puerto Nuevo	Hato Rey and Gobernador Piñero in San Juan	Containerized freight on cargo ships		Pier H	Wharf	~660		39 ft	Open	National Shipping of America
Port Zone of Puerto Nuevo	Hato Rey and Gobernador Piñero in San Juan	Containerized freight on cargo ships		Pier G	Wharf	~660		39 ft	Open	Luis A. Ayala Colon Sucrs
Port Zone of Puerto Nuevo	Hato Rey and Gobernador Piñero in San Juan	Containerized freight on cargo ships		Pier F	Wharf	~660		39 ft	Open	Luis A. Ayala Colon Sucrs
Port Zone of Puerto Nuevo	Hato Rey and Gobernador Piñero in San Juan	Containerized freight on cargo ships		Pier E	Wharf	~660		39 ft	Open	Luis A. Ayala Colon Sucrs
Port Zone of Puerto Nuevo	Hato Rey and Gobernador Piñero in San Juan	Bulk freight on bulk carriers		Pier D	Wharf	~660		39 ft	Open and under plans of redevelopment	Puerto Rico Ports Authority
Port Zone of Puerto Nuevo	Hato Rey and Gobernador Piñero in San Juan	Containerized freight on cargo ships		Pier C	Wharf	~660		39 ft	Open and under plans of redevelopment	Puerto Rico Ports Authority
Port Zone of Puerto Nuevo	Hato Rey and Gobernador Piñero in San Juan	Petroleum and natural gas on tankers		Pier B	Wharf	~500		39 ft	Open	New Fortress Energy
Port Zone of Puerto Nuevo	Hato Rey and Gobernador Piñero in San Juan	Petroleum and natural gas on tankers		Pier A	Wharf	~500		39 ft	Open	New Fortress Energy
Port Zone of Puerto Nuevo	Hato Rey and Gobernador Piñero in San Juan	Petroleum and natural gas on tankers		Pier A	Oil pier	East	~555	39 ft	Open	New Fortress Energy
Port Zone of Puerto Nuevo	Hato Rey and Gobernador Piñero in San Juan	Petroleum and natural gas on tankers		Pier A	Oil pier	West	~555	39 ft	Open	New Fortress Energy
Port Zone of Pueblo Viejo	Pueblo Viejo in Guaynabo	Containerized freight on cargo ships		Army Terminal	Pier	East	~660	39 ft	Open	Puerto Rico Ports Authority
Port Zone of Pueblo Viejo	Pueblo Viejo in Guaynabo	Containerized freight on cargo ships		Army Terminal	Pier	West	~660	39 ft	Open	Puerto Rico Ports Authority
Port Zone of Pueblo Viejo	Pueblo Viejo in Guaynabo	Gasoline on tankers		Army Terminal	Oil pier	East	~280	35 ft	Open	Puma Energy
Port Zone of Pueblo Viejo	Pueblo Viejo in Guaynabo	Grain on bulk carriers		Grain piers		East	~490	30 ft	Open	Pan American Grain
Port Zone of Pueblo Viejo	Pueblo Viejo in Guaynabo	Grain on bulk carriers		Grain piers		East	~990	30 ft	Open	Mills of Puerto Rico

== Ferry services ==
Cataño Ferry sailing from Cataño municipality to Old San Juan quarter, 2026

The Port of San Juan includes ferry facilities, namely the Cataño Ferry. It provides public transportation between the Old San Juan historic quarter in San Juan Islet in the northeastern side of San Juan Bay and the municipality of Cataño in the southwestern side of the bay. Until 2014, it included the Hato Rey Ferry, which ran from Old San Juan to the southeastern Hato Rey business center of San Juan.

District	Location	Use	Terminal				Berth		Status	Operator
District	Location	Use	Image	Side	Name	Type	Space	Draft	Status	Operator
Old San Juan and Cataño	Old San Juan in San Juan Islet, San Juan and Cataño	Public transport		East	San Juan terminal (Pier 2)	Pier	145 ft (each)	<20 ft	Open	Puerto Rico Ports Authority
Old San Juan and Cataño	Old San Juan in San Juan Islet, San Juan and Cataño	Public transport		West	San Juan terminal (Pier 2)	Pier	145 ft (each)	<20 ft	Open	Puerto Rico Ports Authority
Old San Juan and Cataño	Old San Juan in San Juan Islet, San Juan and Cataño	Public transport		East	Cataño Terminal	Pier	145 ft (each)	<20 ft	Open	Puerto Rico Ports Authority
Old San Juan and Cataño	Old San Juan in San Juan Islet, San Juan and Cataño	Public transport		West	Cataño Terminal	Pier	145 ft (each)	<20 ft	Open	Puerto Rico Ports Authority
Old San Juan and Hato Rey	Old San Juan in San Juan Islet, San Juan and Hato Rey	Public transport		East	San Juan Terminal (Pier 2)	Pier	145 ft (each)	<20 ft	Discontinued	Puerto Rico Ports Authority
Old San Juan and Hato Rey	Old San Juan in San Juan Islet, San Juan and Hato Rey	Public transport		West	San Juan Terminal (Pier 2)	Pier	145 ft (each)	<20 ft	Discontinued	Puerto Rico Ports Authority
Old San Juan and Hato Rey	Old San Juan in San Juan Islet, San Juan and Hato Rey	Public transport		East	Hato Rey Terminal	Pier	108 ft (each)	<20 ft	Discontinued	Puerto Rico Ports Authority
Old San Juan and Hato Rey	Old San Juan in San Juan Islet, San Juan and Hato Rey	Public transport		West	Hato Rey Terminal	Pier	108 ft (each)	<20 ft	Discontinued	Puerto Rico Ports Authority
Old San Juan and Hato Rey	Old San Juan in San Juan Islet, San Juan and Hato Rey	Public transport		East	Hato Rey Terminal	Pier	108 ft (each)	<20 ft	Discontinued	Puerto Rico Ports Authority
Old San Juan and Hato Rey	Old San Juan in San Juan Islet, San Juan and Hato Rey	Public transport		West	Hato Rey Terminal	Pier	108 ft (each)	<20 ft	Discontinued	Puerto Rico Ports Authority

== Marina facilities ==
Sea Owl yacht moored at Pier 9 of the Port of San Juan, 2025

The Port of San Juan includes marina facilities. Within the San Antonio Channel in the northeastern side of San Juan Bay, between Puerta de Tierra in San Juan Islet and Isla Grande in Santurce, it has two terminals dedicated to yachts, including superyachts. At the eastern end of the channel next to Guillermo Esteves Bridge, it accommodates a marina for small yachts and boats. In the southern side of Isla Grande, it has a refit facility for super yachts equipped with graving and floating dry docks.

District	Location	Use	Terminal			Berth		Status	Operator
District	Location	Use	Image	Name	Type	Space	Draft	Status	Operator
Port Zone of Puerta de Tierra	Puerta de Tierra in San Juan Islet, San Juan	Yachts, including superyachts		Pier 9	Pier	1,200 ft (combined)	25 ft	Open	Safe Harbor San Juan
Port Zone of Puerta de Tierra	Puerta de Tierra in San Juan Islet, San Juan	Yachts, including superyachts		Pier 10	Wharf	1,200 ft (combined)	25 ft	Open	Safe Harbor San Juan
Port Zone of Puerta de Tierra	Puerta de Tierra in San Juan Islet, San Juan	Small yachts and boats		Pier		1,500 ft (combined)	<25 ft	Open	Club Náutico de San Juan
Port Zone of Puerta de Tierra	Puerta de Tierra in San Juan Islet, San Juan	Small yachts and boats		Wharf		1,500 ft (combined)	<25 ft	Open	Club Náutico de San Juan
Port Zone of Isla Grande	Isla Grande in Santurce, San Juan	Small yachts and boats		Pier		1,075 ft (combined)	<25 ft	Open	San Juan Bay Marina
Port Zone of Isla Grande	Isla Grande in Santurce, San Juan	Refitting for superyachts		Pier 16	Graving dock (Dry dock)	675 ft	26 ft	Open and under redevelopment	Gravity Refit
Port Zone of Isla Grande	Isla Grande in Santurce, San Juan	Refitting for superyachts		Pier 16	Floating dock (Dry dock)	~200 ft	25 ft	Open and under redevelopment	Gravity Refit
Port Zone of Isla Grande	Isla Grande in Santurce, San Juan	Refitting for superyachts		Pier 16	Wharf	~565 ft	25 ft	Open and under redevelopment	Gravity Refit

== U.S. Coast Guard station ==
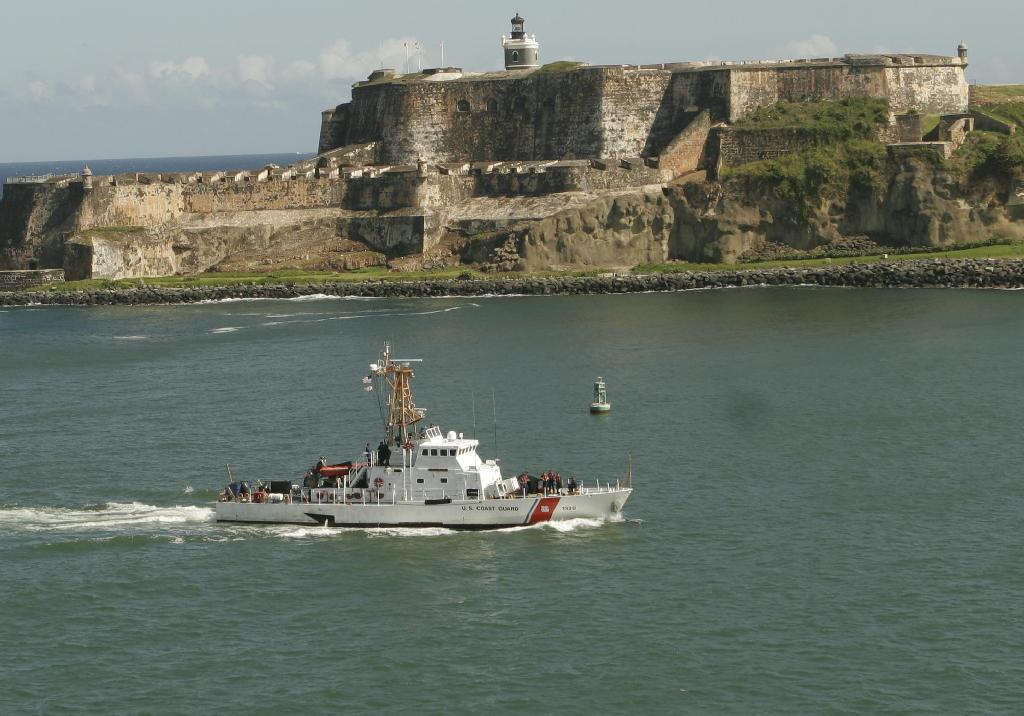
USCGC Chincoteague entering the Port of San Juan next to El Morro fortress, 2010

The Port of San Juan includes a United States Coast Guard station, which serves as the base for the San Juan Sector of the Southeast District of the U.S. Coast Guard. It is located in La Puntilla, a small peninsula in the southwestern part of Old San Juan, which houses the original navy and custom facilites of the capital city under the Spanish Empire during the Age of Discovery and Sail. Responsible for the eastern Caribbean Sea, the station handles search and rescues, ports waterways security, illegal drug and migrant interdictions, aids to navigation, marine safety and environmental protection, defense readiness, and other law enforcement operations.

District	Location	Use	Terminal				Berth		Status	Operator
District	Location	Use	Image	Side	Name	Type	Space	Draft	Status	Operator
Old San Juan	Old San Juan in San Juan Islet, San Juan and Cataño	Waterways security, homeland security, including drug and migrant interdiction, and search and rescue		North	Pier		190 ft (each)	20 ft	Open	United States Coast Guard
Old San Juan	Old San Juan in San Juan Islet, San Juan and Cataño	Waterways security, homeland security, including drug and migrant interdiction, and search and rescue		South	Pier		190 ft (each)	20 ft	Open	United States Coast Guard
Old San Juan	Old San Juan in San Juan Islet, San Juan and Cataño	Waterways security, homeland security, including drug and migrant interdiction, and search and rescue		North	Pier		190 ft (each)	20 ft	Open	United States Coast Guard
Old San Juan	Old San Juan in San Juan Islet, San Juan and Cataño	Waterways security, homeland security, including drug and migrant interdiction, and search and rescue		South	Pier		190 ft (each)	20 ft	Open	United States Coast Guard
Old San Juan	Old San Juan in San Juan Islet, San Juan and Cataño	Waterways security, homeland security, including drug and migrant interdiction, and search and rescue		North	Pier		190 ft (each)	20 ft	Open	United States Coast Guard
Old San Juan	Old San Juan in San Juan Islet, San Juan and Cataño	Waterways security, homeland security, including drug and migrant interdiction, and search and rescue		South	Pier		190 ft (each)	20 ft	Open	United States Coast Guard
Old San Juan	Old San Juan in San Juan Islet, San Juan and Cataño	Waterways security, homeland security, including drug and migrant interdiction, and search and rescue		North	Pier		190 ft (each)	20 ft	Open	United States Coast Guard
Old San Juan	Old San Juan in San Juan Islet, San Juan and Cataño	Waterways security, homeland security, including drug and migrant interdiction, and search and rescue		South	Pier		190 ft (each)	20 ft	Open	United States Coast Guard

== See also ==
- Transportation in Puerto Rico
- Port of Mayagüez
- Port of Ponce
