= Puerto Rico Department of Transportation and Public Works =

Government agency in Puerto Rico

Department of Transportation and Public Works
- Departamento de Transportación y Obras Públicas de Puerto Rico (DTOP)

Agency overview
- Formed: July 24, 1952; 74 years ago
- Type: Executive department
- Jurisdiction: Statewide
- Headquarters: San Juan, Puerto Rico
- Agency executive: Eileen Vélez Vega, Secretary
- Child agencies: AMA; Commission on Traffic Safety; Maritime Transport Authority; PRHTA; Ports Authority
- Key documents: Law No. 6 of 1952; Article IV of the Constitution of Puerto Rico; Reorganization Plan No. 6 of 1971
- Website: www.dtop.pr.gov

The Department of Transportation and Public Works (DTOP; Spanish: Departamento de Transportación y Obras Públicas) is the Executive Department of the Commonwealth of Puerto Rico that regulates transportation and public works in Puerto Rico. The agency's headquarters are located in San Juan.

== Agencies ==
The following agencies are involved in transportation issues of Puerto Rico.

Name in English	Name in Spanish	Abbreviation in Spanish
Commission on Traffic Safety	Comisión para la Seguridad en el Tránsito	CST
Highways and Transportation Authority	Autoridad de Carreteras y Transportación	ACT
Maritime Transport Authority	Autoridad de Transporte Marítimo	ATM
Metropolitan Bus Authority	Autoridad Metropolitana de Autobuses	AMA
Ports Authority	Autoridad de los Puertos	AP
